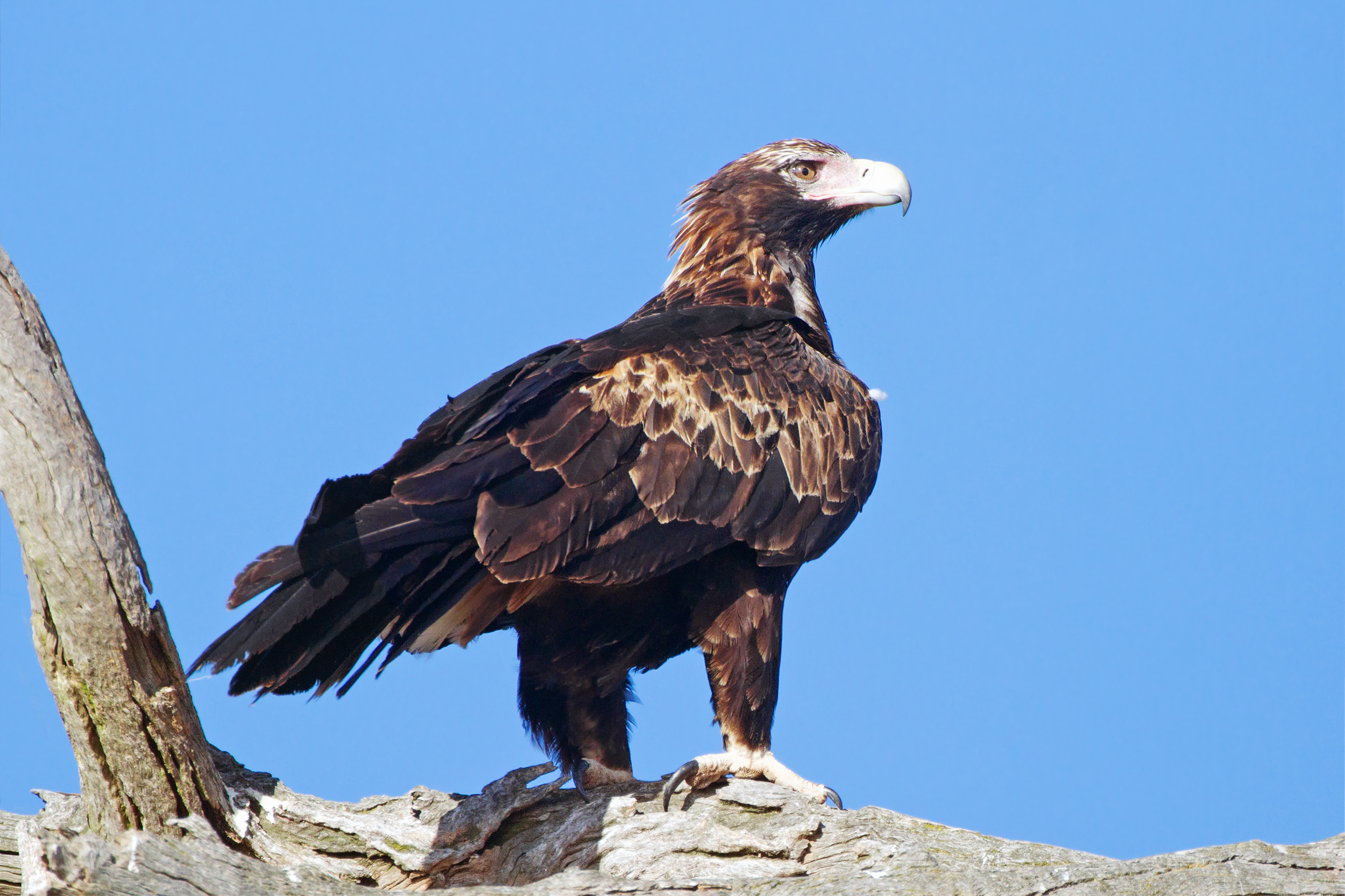
- At Captains Flat, New South Wales

Conservation status
- Least Concern (IUCN 3.1)
- CITES Appendix II

Scientific classification
- Kingdom: Animalia
- Phylum: Chordata
- Class: Aves
- Order: Accipitriformes
- Family: Accipitridae
- Genus: Aquila
- Species: A. audax

Binomial name
- Aquila audax (Latham, 1801)

Subspecies
- A. a. audax (Latham, 1801); A. a. fleayi Condon & Amadon, 1954
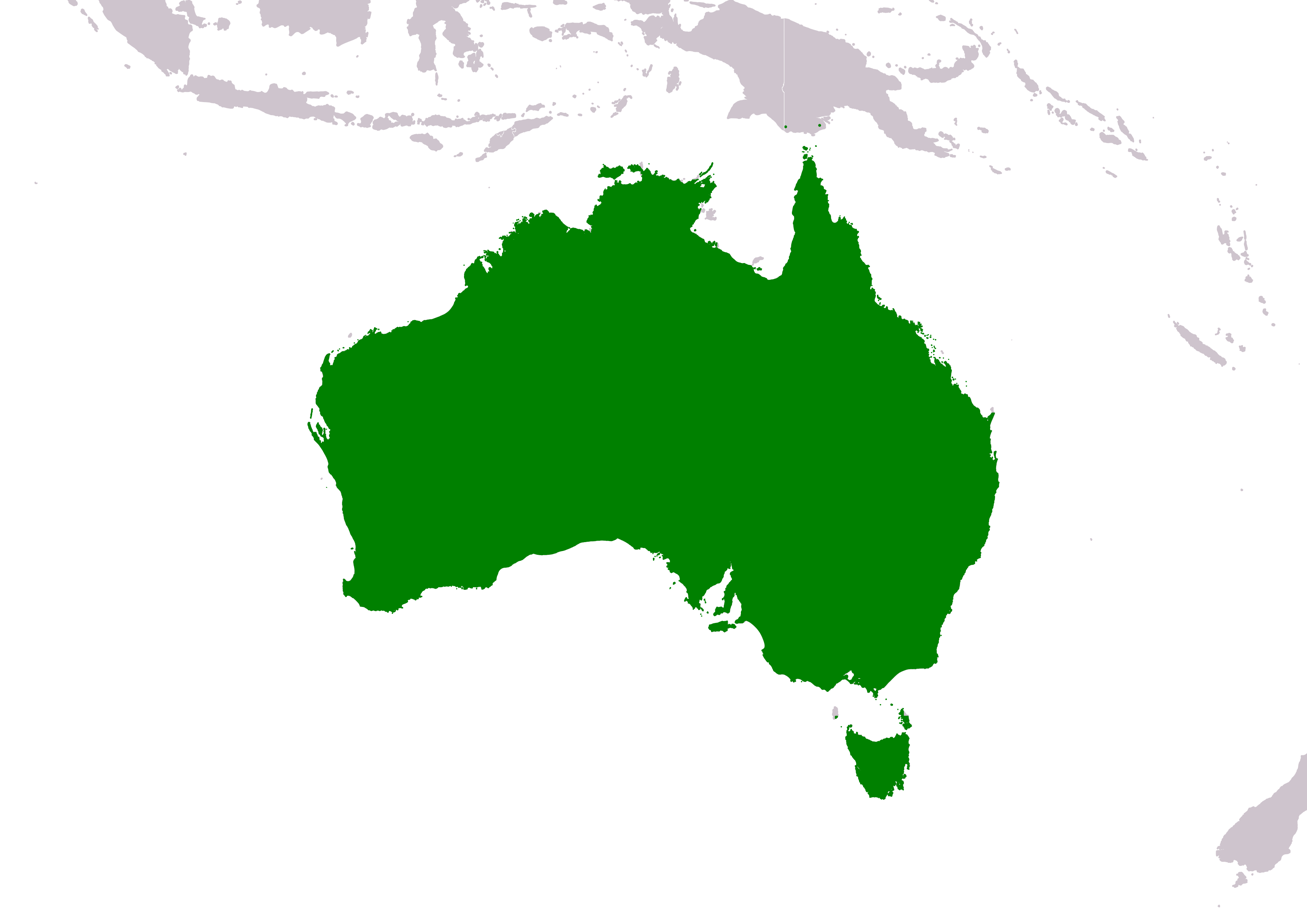
- Range of A. audax Resident

Synonyms
- Vultur audax Latham, 1801; Aquila albirostris Vieillot, 1816; Aquila fuscosa Dumont, 1816; Aquila cuneicaudata C.L. Brehm, 1845; Aquila audax carteri Mathews, 1912

= Wedge-tailed eagle =

Species of bird

The wedge-tailed eagle (Aquila audax) is the largest bird of prey in the continent of Australia. It is also found in southern New Guinea and is distributed as far south as the state of Tasmania. Adults of the species have long, broad wings, fully feathered legs, an unmistakable, wedge-shaped tail, an elongated upper mandible, a strong beak, and powerful feet. The wedge-tailed eagle is one of 12 species of large, predominantly dark-coloured booted eagles in the genus Aquila found worldwide. Genetic research clearly has indicated that the wedge-tailed eagle is fairly closely related to other, generally large members of the Aquila genus. A large, brown-to-black bird of prey, it has a maximum reported wingspan of 2.84 m (9 ft 4 in) and a length up to 1.06 m (3 ft 6 in).

Wedge-tailed eagles are some of their native continent's most generalised birds of prey. They reside in most habitats present in Australia, ranging from desert and semidesert to plains to mountainous areas to forests, even sometimes tropical rainforests. Their preferred habitats, however, tend towards those that have a fairly varied topography, including rocky areas, some open terrain, and native woodlots such as Eucalyptus stands.

The wedge-tailed eagle is one of the world's most powerful avian predators. Although a true generalist, which hunts a wide range of prey, including birds, reptiles, and rarely other taxa, the species is, by and large, a mammal predator. The introduction of the European rabbit (Oryctolagus cuniculus) has been a boon to the wedge-tailed eagle and they hunt these and other invasive species in large volume, although the wedge-tailed eagle otherwise generally lives on marsupials, including many surprisingly large macropods. Additionally, the wedge-tailed eagle often eats carrion, especially while young. The species tends to pair for several years, possibly mating for life.

Wedge-tailed eagles usually construct a large stick nest in an ample tree, normally the largest in a stand, and lay one to four eggs, though typically only two. Usually, breeding efforts manage to produce one or two fledglings, which after a few months more, tend to disperse widely. Nesting failures are usually attributable to human interference, such as logging activity and other alterations, which both degrade habitats and cause disturbances. The species is known to be highly sensitive to human disturbance at the nest, which may lead to abandonment of the young.

Although historically heavily persecuted by humans through poisoning and shooting, mostly for alleged predation on sheep, wedge-tailed eagles have proved to be exceptionally resilient, and their numbers have quickly rebounded to being similar or even higher numbers than before European colonisation, due in part to humans inadvertently providing several food sources, such as rabbits and a large volume of roadkill.

== Taxonomy ==
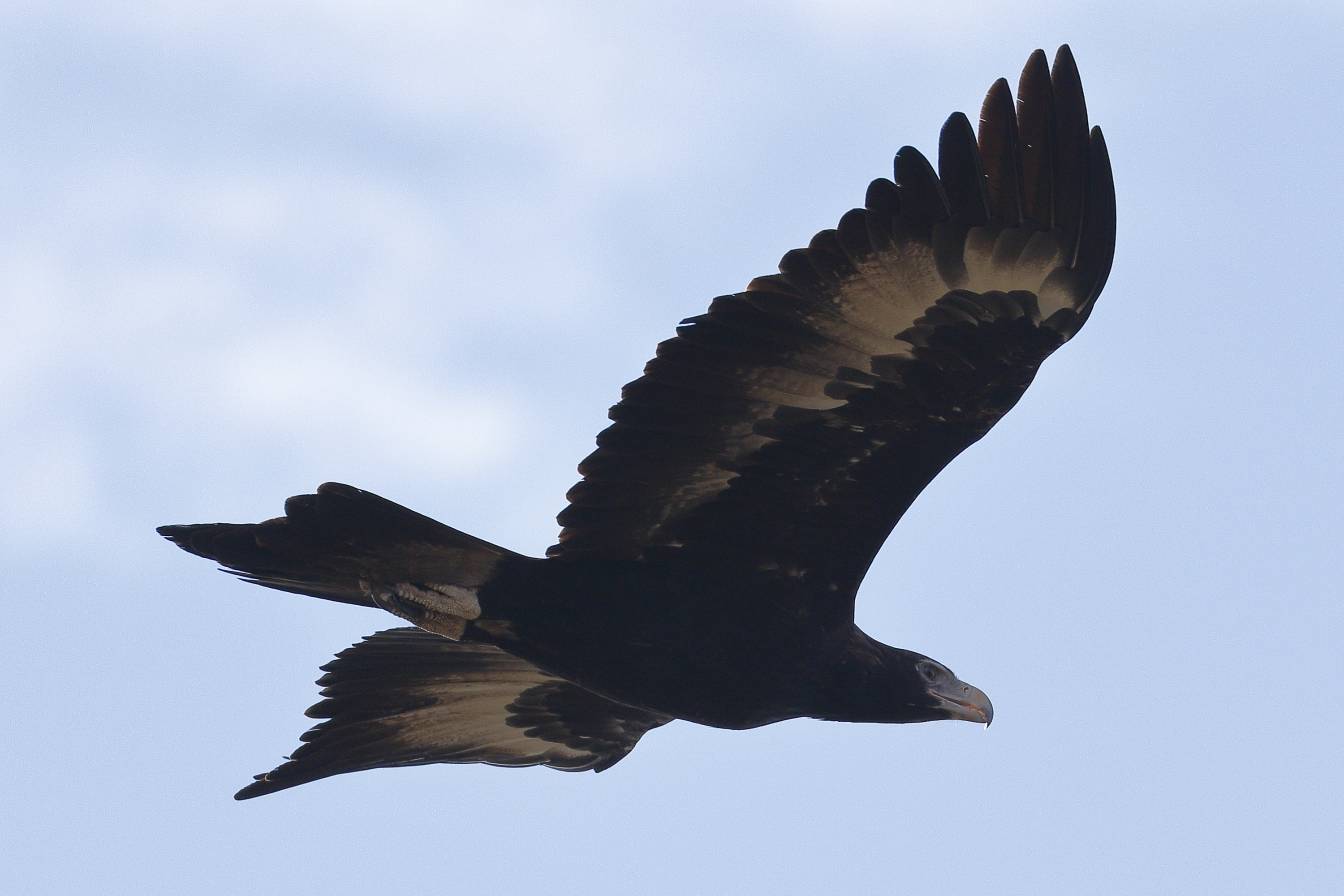
An adult wedge-tailed eagle at Lake Burrumbeet in flight, notably dark and blackish colour

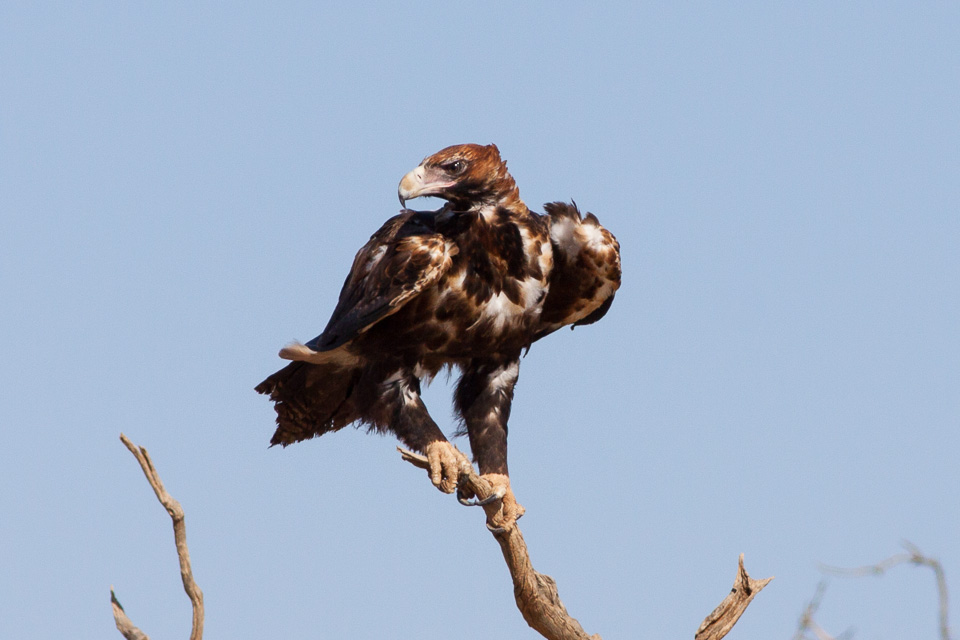
A young wedge-tailed eagle perched in Birdsville Track with an unusual amount of pale colour showing due likely to moult

The species was first described in 1801 by English ornithologist John Latham under the binomial name Vultur audax. At one time, the wedge-tailed eagle was classified in its own monotypical genus Uroaetus, perhaps due to its unique form.

Today, the genus Vultur is used only for a completely unrelated bird of the New World vulture family, the Andean condor (Vultur gryphus). The specific scientific name for the species, audax, is derived from the Latin audax, meaning "bold", indicative of their perceived disposition, perhaps when hunting, although the species is, in general, highly wary and even timid around humans.

The species is quite similar in many aspects of its morphology, appearance, behaviour, and life history to other species in the Aquila genus. The eagles of the Aquila genus are part of the subfamily Aquilinae, within the larger Accipitridae family. The subfamily is commonly referred to as booted eagles or sometimes as true eagles. Those species may be distinguished from most other accipitrids by the feathering covering their legs, regardless of distribution. With some 39 or so species, the Aquilinae are present on every continent except Antarctica.

By a variety of phylogenetic testing, largely via mitochondrial DNA and nuclear DNA, the wedge-tailed eagle clusters genetically with certain other Aquila eagles. The species found to share the most genetic similarities is Verreaux's eagle (A. verreauxii) of Africa. However, Gurney's eagle (A. gurneyi), a mostly allopatric but outwardly fairly similar eagle, is clearly a very close relation of the wedge-tailed eagle, and the two are likely sister species, most probably originating from the same radiation across the Indo-Pacific region.

The wedge-tailed, Gurney's, and Verreaux's eagles form a clade or a species complex with the well-known golden eagle (A. chrysaetos), the most widely distributed species in the entire accipitrid family, as well as outwardly dissimilar (smaller and paler-bellied yet also powerful) eagles like Bonelli's eagle (A. fasciata), the African hawk-eagle (A. spilogaster), and Cassin's hawk-eagle (A. africanus), the latter three having once been considered members of a different genus.

Beyond the aforementioned species, based on genetic testing, the four other Aquila species, although outwardly similar to golden and wedge-tailed eagles, being large, dark, and brownish, with long wings, are thought to form a separate clade, and are paraphyletic from the members of what can be called the golden eagle clade. Other related outliers from outside the Aquila genus are the small to mid-sized Clanga or spotted eagle species, and the widely found and quite small Hieraeetus eagles. One member of the latter genus contains the only other widely found Aquilinae eagle in Australia, the little eagle (Hieraaetus morphnoides).

=== Subspecies ===
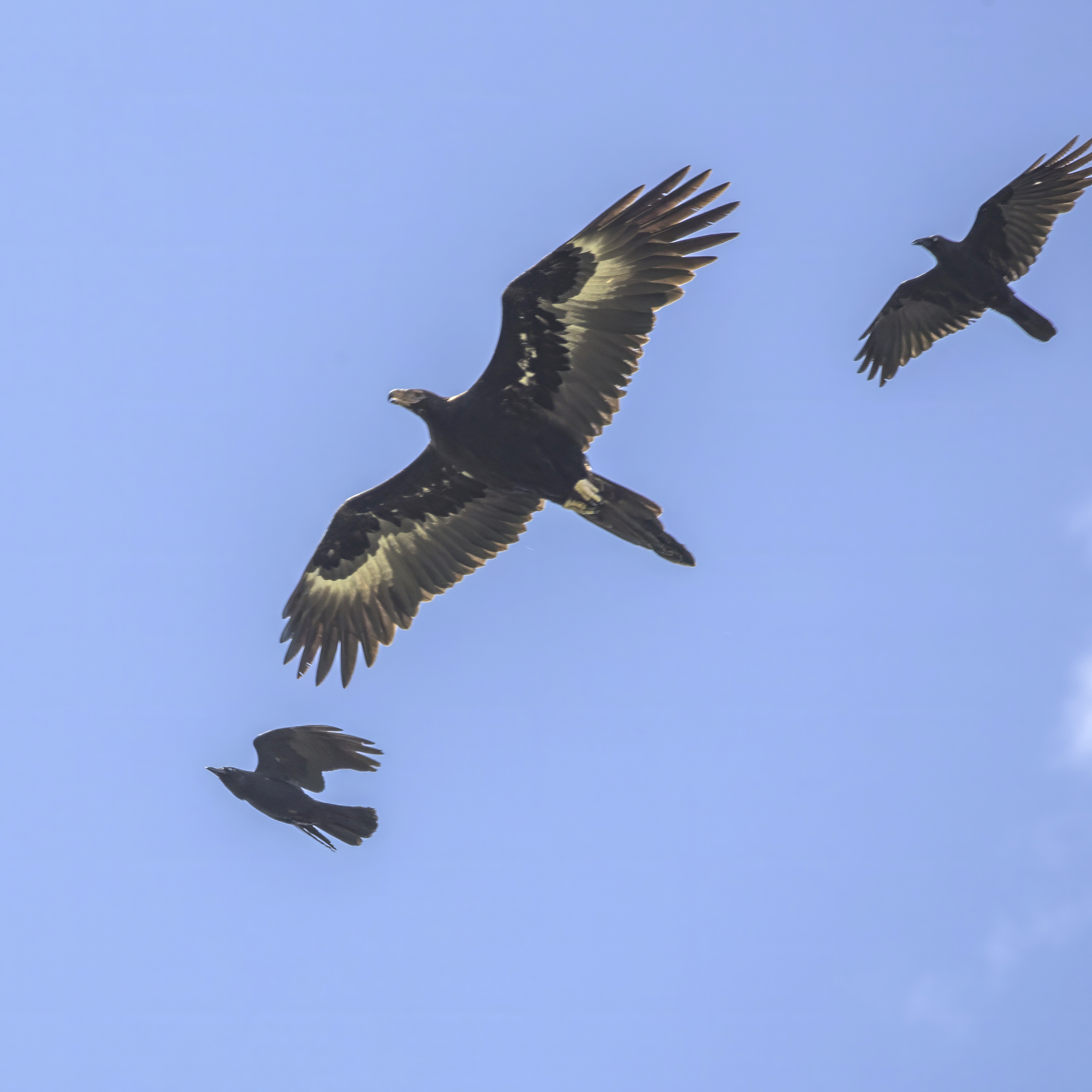
A. a. fleayi, mobbed by forest ravens in Tasmania

Two subspecies of wedge-tailed eagle are recognised. However, the separation of the two subspecies has been called into question, largely because the reported differences in both size and coloration can be attributed to clinal variation, and some of the insular populations may still be at an intermediate stage of subspecific formation.

- A. a. audax (Latham, 1801) – This subspecies resides in the entire continent of Australia, as well as in southern New Guinea. It is the typical wedge-tailed eagle as subsequently described.
- A. a. fleayi (Condon & Amadon, 1954) – This race is endemic to Tasmania. The subspecies is named in honour of David Fleay, an Australian naturalist who was the first to propose the difference of the insular race. A. a. fleayi differs from mainland wedge-tailed eagles mainly via size and colouring. It is larger than the mainland eagle and is said to have particularly outsized talon dimensions compared to mainland eagles. Furthermore, it has a deep chocolate brown overall colour rather than blackish, with a whitish-buff colouring to the nape rather than tawny-rufous feathers there. The juvenile is altogether paler and sandier than an equivalent-aged wedge-tailed eagle on mainland Australia.

Although the validity of the subspecies has been questioned, genetic studies have determined that no gene flow or introgression occurs between Tasmanian and other wedge-tailed eagles. Furthermore, the insular race was likely formed by marine dispersals, a process in which wedge-tailed eagles may continue to engage despite usually avoiding large bodies of water, albeit usually in narrower straits.

== Description ==
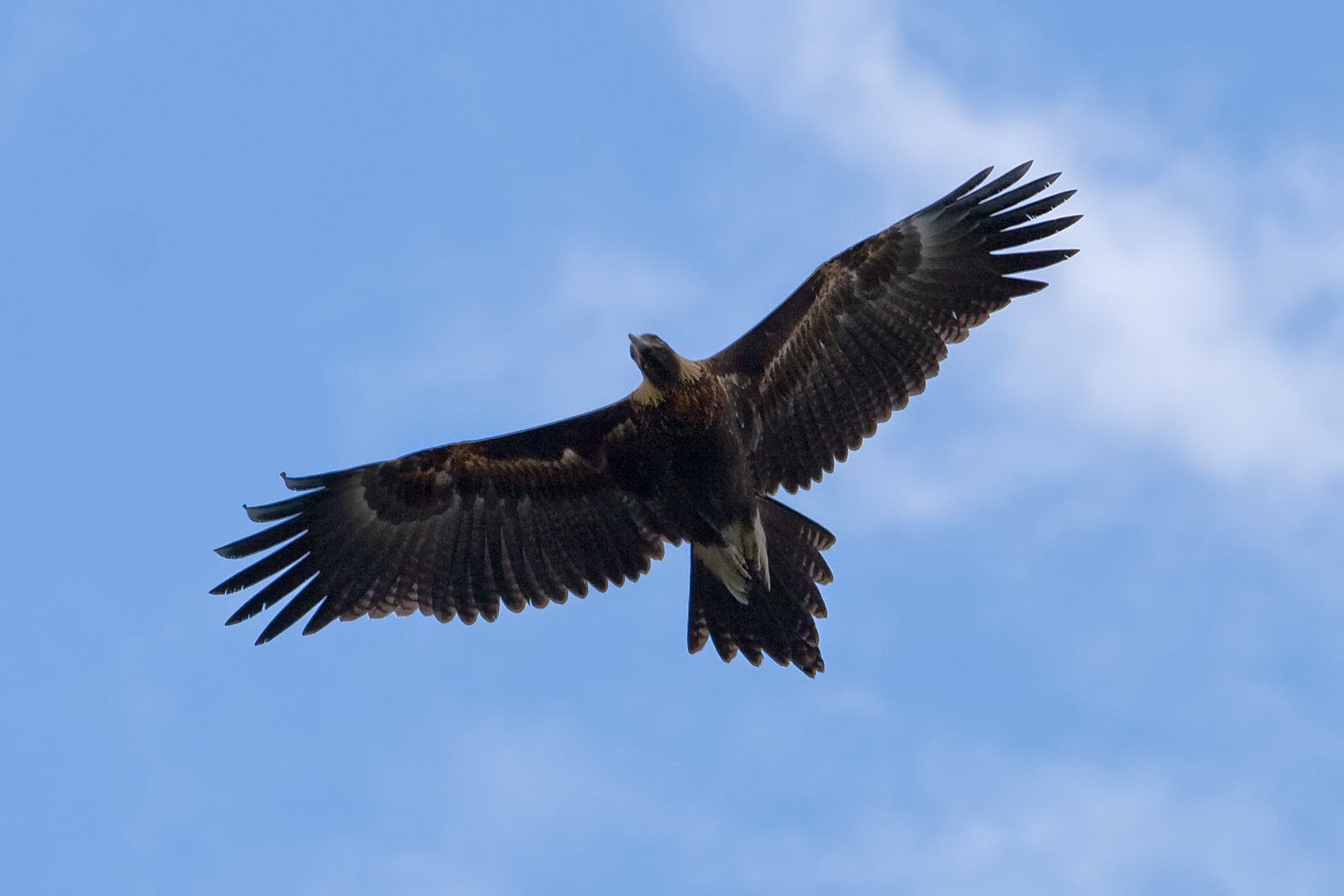
In flight, the wedged tail is clearly visible.

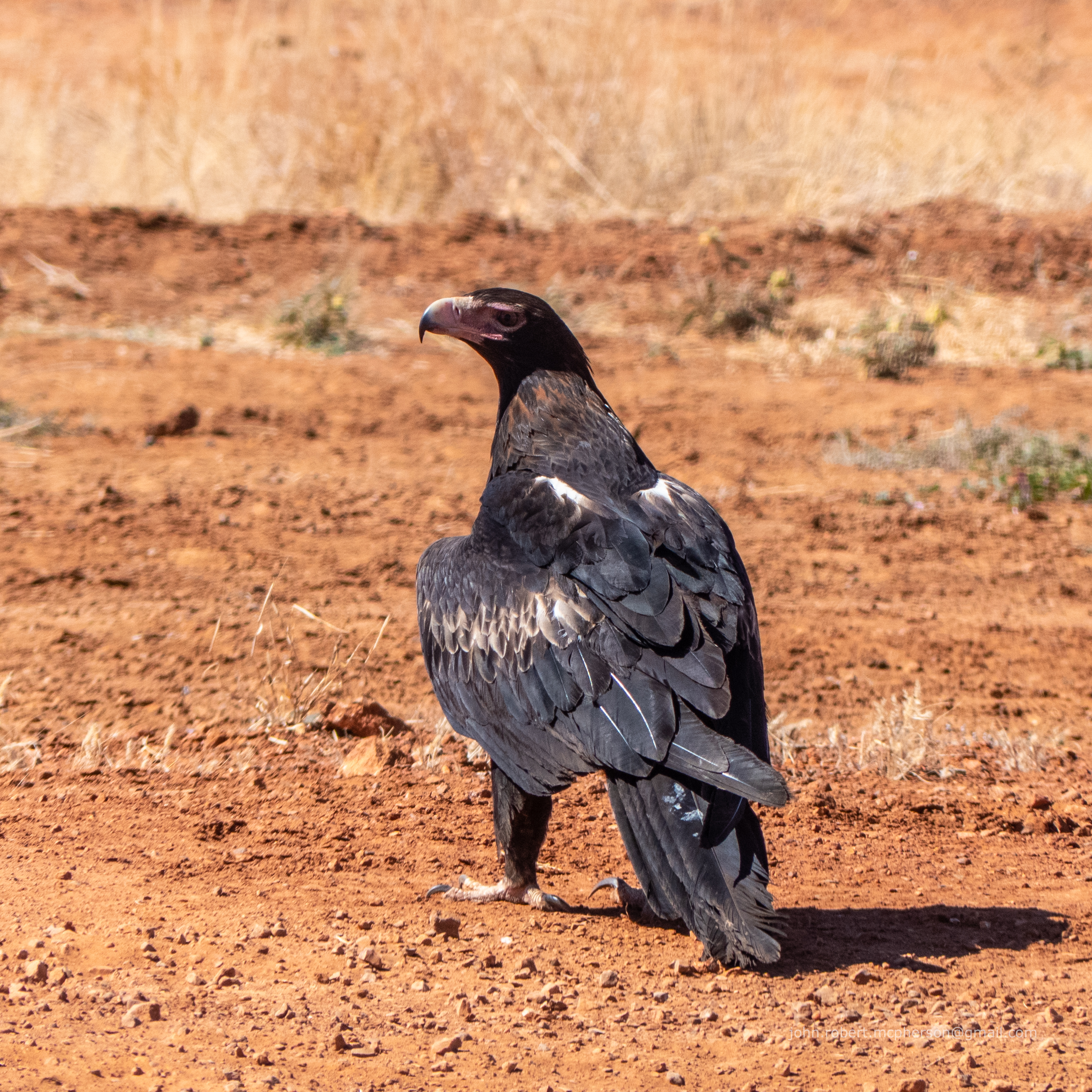
A wedge-tailed eagle foraging on the ground

Wedge-tailed eagles are large birds with a characteristically black appearance, although they can appear tar to charcoal brown, depending on lighting and individual variation. They have large bills, but possess relatively smaller and flatter heads, with a long, almost vulturine necks. Furthermore, they are distinctive for their prominent carpals and baggy-feathered "trousers". The species tends to perch conspicuously on dead trees, telegraph poles, rocks, or at times, the open ground. Between the bill size, elongated shape, and prominent shoulders, the species is highly distinctive. While perched, their wings extend down to a long and markedly wedge-tipped tail.

They have a large proportion of bare facial skin, which is thought to be an adaptation to the warm climate of their habitats rather than for eating carrion. Against the blackish plumage, the tawny-rufous hackles on the neck, forming a lanceolate shape, as well as the pale brown to rufous crissum, and narrow, mottled grey-brown band across the greater wing coverts, all stand out well. The sexes are indistinguishable by plumage.

The juvenile is mainly darkish brown, with extensive rufous feather edging, and a paler, fairly streaky head. Furthermore, the juvenile has a lighter-brown crissum, and a light reddish-brown to golden nape, with similar colouring extending sometimes to the back and wing band. The wing band is considerably more prominent than those of adults, extending to the median and sometimes the lesser coverts. Rarely, a juvenile may be all dull black, lacking rufous edges or a wing band. Young eagles are much the same by the second through to the fourth years, though they may be almost invariably visibly in moult and with a narrowing wing band. They become darker around the fifth year, with a red-brown nape and a still-narrowing wing band. Full mature plumage is not attained until the seventh or eighth year, although sexual maturity can be considered as early as five.

Adults have dark brown eyes, while juveniles usually have similar but slightly darker eyes. Wedge-tailed eagles are typically creamy white on the cere and feet, although those can be dull yellow, more so in juveniles than adults. The wedge-tailed eagle has a unique moult process in that they moult almost continuously and very slowly, and three or more years may be needed for an eagle of the species to complete a moult. Moults are arrested only at times of famine, and happen gradually, so that they do not impede the bird's flight or hunting capabilities.

In flight, wedge-tailed eagles appear as a very large, dark raptor, with a protruding head, long and relatively narrow-looking wings, more-or-less parallel edged when soaring, and most distinctly, a long, diamond-shaped tail. The shape is dissimilar to any other raptor in the world. Juveniles tend to be broader-winged by comparison. The wingspan is around 2.2 times greater than the bird's total length. They tend to fly with rather loose but deep and powerful beats. Wedge-tailed eagles spend much time sailing along, looking quite stable and controlled even in strong winds. The species glides and soars on upswept wings with long, splayed primaries. The ample tail may be upcurved, or "dished", at the edges. The eagle often spreads its deep wing emarginations to reduce drag in high winds. Contrary to their superlative and controlled appearance once on the wing, flight for wedge-tailed eagles can be a struggle even in normal circumstances, unless it is from a pinnacle or winds are somewhat high, and within the forest, they may clamber about, with a "lack of grace", to reach the canopy. Gorged birds on the ground can be vulnerable, being practically grounded, which was an advantage historically to Aboriginal hunters. Human gliders have encountered wedge-tailed eagles at more than 3,000 m (9,800 ft).

The adult is all blackish on the wing but for the tawny-rufous nape and greyish wing band (running less than a quarter of the way down the wing's width). Little relieves the dark coloration below but the pale brown to rufous crissum and the pale greyish bases to their flight feathers. Juvenile wedge-tailed eagles appear much browner although in general are not dissimilar in pattern below though the body and wings relative to adult. However, juveniles may show some paler mottling, of an off-rufous colour. Meanwhile, the juvenile's tail and most flight feathers are barred greyish which in turn contrast against the pale based primaries with black tips. Above, the juvenile bears much paler and more sandy rufous colour from the head to at least upper mantle and along broad wing band (as well as more than half the wing width). The lighter dorsal colour sometimes extends to much of the back and scapulars. Rare individual juvenile eagles are dull black, without a wing band or paler edges. With much variation in individuals, generally as the young eagles age, the signature wing band shrinks incrementally and, after the fifth year, the plumage darkens.

=== Size ===
The female wedge-tailed eagle is one of the world's largest eagles. Its nearest rival in Australia for size is some 15% smaller linearly and 25% lighter in weight. As is typical in birds of prey, the female is larger than the male. Although a few individual females are larger by only a small amount, they average up to 33 per cent larger. A full-grown female weighs between 3.0 and 5.8 kg (6.6 and 12.8 lb), while the smaller males weigh 2 to 4 kg (4.4 to 8.8 lb). Total length varies between 81 and 106 cm (32 and 42 in) and the wingspan typically is between 182 and 232 cm (6 ft 0 in and 7 ft 7 in). In 1930, the average weight and wingspans of 43 birds were 3.4 kg (7.5 lb) and 204.3 cm (6 ft 8 in). The same average figures for a survey of 126 eagles in 1932 were 3.63 kg (8.0 lb) and 226 cm (7 ft 5 in), respectively.

According to one guide, the mean body mass of male wedge-tailed eagles is 2.5 kg (5.5 lb), while that of females is listed as 4.7 kg (10 lb), which if accurate, is one of the most extreme examples of size sexual dimorphism known in any bird of prey. However, another sample showed far less stark size differences, with 29 males weighing an average of 3.13 kg (6.9 lb) and 29 females an average of 3.8 kg (8.4 lb). In the same sample, from the Nullarbor Plain, males averaged wingspan of 193 cm (6 ft 4 in) (sample n = 26) and body length of 85.2 cm (33.5 in) (n = 5), while females had an average wingspan of 209 cm (6 ft 10 in) (n = 23) and body length of 92.1 cm (36.3 in).

The largest wingspan ever verified for an eagle was for this species. A female killed in Tasmania in 1931 had a wingspan of 284 cm (9 ft 4 in), and another female measured barely smaller at 279 cm (9 ft 2 in). Similar claims, however, have been made for Steller's sea eagle (Haliaeetus pelagicus), which has been said to reach or exceed 274 cm (9 ft 0 in) in wingspan. Reported claims of wedge-tailed eagles spanning 312 cm (10 ft 3 in) and 340 cm (11 ft 2 in) were unverified and deemed to be unreliable per Guinness World Records. This eagle's great length and wingspan place it among the largest eagles in the world, but its wings, at more than 65 cm (26 in), and tail, up to 45 cm (18 in), are unusually elongated for its body weight, and 9 or 10 other eagle species regularly outweigh it. It is around the third-heaviest Aquila species, outsized only somewhat by the golden eagle and slightly by Verreaux's eagle, although it only slightly exceeds the weight of the Spanish imperial eagle (A. adalberti). Among the entire booted eagle subfamily, in addition to the two heavier Aquila species, it is outsized in bulk by the martial eagle (Polemaetus bellicosus), while the also long-tailed crowned eagle (Stephanoaetus coronatus) can average of a roughly similar body mass to the wedge-tailed eagle, although the latter is marginally the heavier bird.

The wedge-tailed is exceeded in body mass by only a few eagles, especially Steller's sea eagle and the harpy eagle (Harpia harpyja) and somewhat by the Philippine eagle (Pithecophaga jefferyi), the white-tailed eagle (Haliaeetus albicilla), and the bald eagle (H. leucocephalus). It rivals the harpy and Stellar's eagles and is known to be exceeded only by the Philippine eagle in total length. The wedge-tailed eagle's wingspan is the largest of any Aquila, and is exceeded amongst all eagles probably only by the white-tailed and Steller's sea eagles in average spread, though its average (not maximum) wingspan is rivaled by that of the martial eagle. Among standard measurements, within the nominate subspecies, the wing chord of males may range from 553 to 667 mm (21.8 to 26.3 in) while that of the female is from 600 to 703 mm (23.6 to 27.7 in).

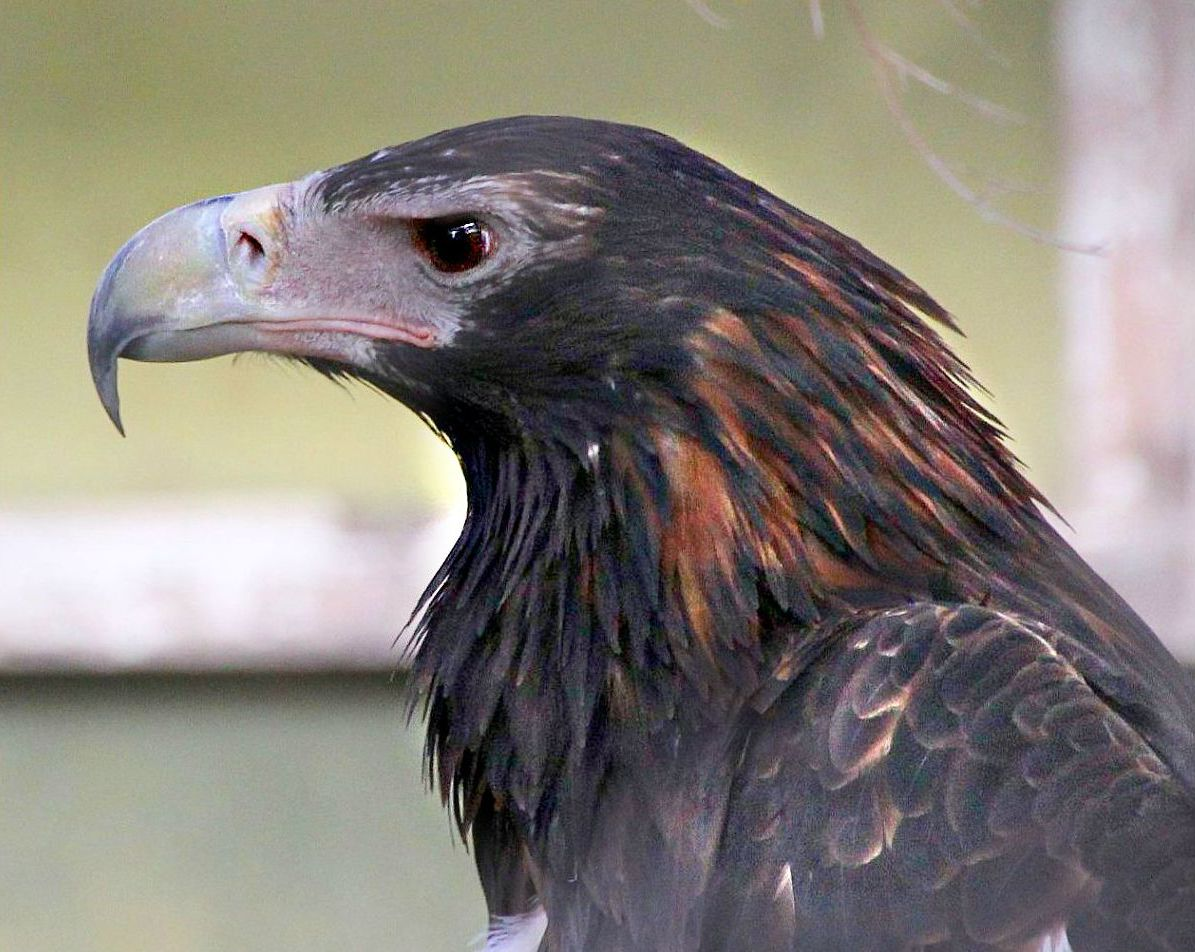
Captive specimen at Symbio Wildlife Park, New South Wales, Australia. Note the massive, pale bill and cere.

In Tasmania, the wing chord measured from 594 to 664 mm (23.4 to 26.1 in) in males and 620 to 711 mm (24.4 to 28.0 in) in females. In Nullarbor Plain, males averaged 587 mm (23.1 in) in wing chord while females averaged 638 mm (25.1 in). Other Australian wedge-tailed eagles averaged 611 mm (24.1 in) in wing chord among males and 650 mm (26 in) among females. In Tasmania, the wing chord averaged 618.8 mm (24.36 in) in males and 661.3 mm (26.04 in) in females. The extreme tail length, slightly to greatly exceeding that of other Aquila, is in males from 352 to 479 mm (13.9 to 18.9 in), averaging 370 mm (15 in) in the Nullarbor eagles and 421.2 mm (16.58 in) in Tasmania, and from 376 to 536 mm (14.8 to 21.1 in), averaging 410 mm (16 in) in Nullarbor and 448.9 mm (17.67 in) in Tasmania. Although they only slightly exceed in tail length the heavier two Aquila and crowned eagles and they can rival the tail lengths of the Philippine and the Harpiinae eagles, Tasmanian wedge-tailed eagles are quite likely to be the longest-tailed of all modern eagles.

The length of the tarsus may be from 99 to 139.9 mm (3.90 to 5.51 in). The tarsus of 7 males averaged 104.3 mm (4.11 in) while that of 7 females averaged 111.1 mm (4.37 in). In terms of bill measurements, the exposed culmen may range from 37.5 to 61.6 mm (1.48 to 2.43 in) in males and 46.3 to 65.1 mm (1.82 to 2.56 in) in females while total bill length (from the gape) is from 55 to 67 mm (2.2 to 2.6 in) and 58.2 to 73 mm (2.29 to 2.87 in), in the sexes respectively. It is likely to be the largest billed Aquila, a bit ahead of the imperial eagles and the Verreaux's eagle, behind only the larger Haliaeetus and Philippine eagles amongst all eagles. In Tasmania, culmen lengths averaged 48.4 mm (1.91 in) in males and 51.4 mm (2.02 in) in females while the total length of the bill averaged 59.4 mm (2.34 in) and 63.2 mm (2.49 in).

The hallux claw, the enlarged rear talon on the hind toe, is slightly smaller than that of a golden or Verreaux's eagle, even proportionately, but is extremely sharp. According to one study, wedge-tailed eagles had a hallux claw of 38.9 mm (1.53 in), ranging from 38.1 to 41 mm (1.50 to 1.61 in), in males 44.7 mm (1.76 in), ranging from 40.6 to 48.1 mm (1.60 to 1.89 in) in a sample of 10, in females. Another source listed the hallux claw of mainland Australian eagles as averaging 41 mm (1.6 in) in males and 46 mm (1.8 in) in females. Meanwhile, in Tasmanian eagles, the hallux claw averaged 45.2 mm (1.78 in), ranging from 38.6 to 48.8 mm (1.52 to 1.92 in) in males while in females, the hallux claw averaged 49.9 mm (1.96 in), ranging from 45.5 to 55.6 mm (1.79 to 2.19 in). In terms of osteological structure and size, the wedge-tailed eagle is said to be proportional to other eagles, being notably smaller and less robust than the heaviest eagles, such as Steller's and harpies, but fairly similar in osteology, in both structure and proportions, to the golden eagle.

=== Identification ===
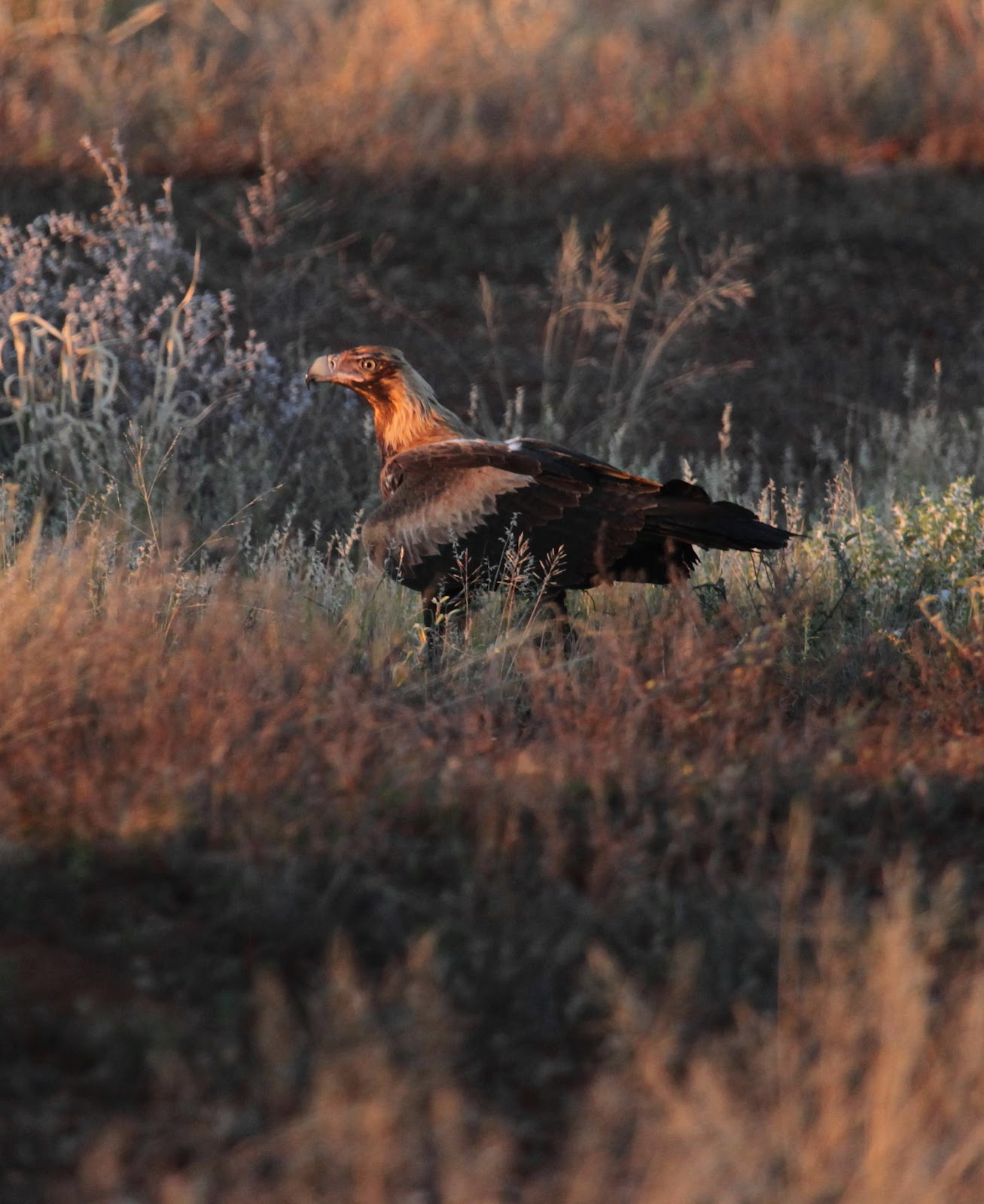
A juvenile in the Northern Territory, notable for paler areas on the wing coverts and nape as well as for a browner overall hue

Their unique combination of large size, lanky build, long, diamond-shaped tail (though can be round-ended when both central feathers are moulted together), mainly black or rather dark plumage, and long wings seen when soaring or gliding make all ages of the wedge-tailed eagle fairly unmistakable in the majority of their range. The only main confusion species is often the black-breasted kite (Hamirostra melanosternon), which is surprisingly similar in colouring but is much smaller with a relatively short, squared tail and extensive clear white windows covering a good part of their wings. Juveniles of the white-bellied sea eagle (Haliaeetus leucogaster), at times mentioned as potentially confusable with a young wedge-tailed eagle, are much paler below with a rather different flight pattern: a short pale tail, bare legs, shorter, broader wings held in stiff dihedral.

In New Guinea, the Gurney's eagle is more similar than those species in form and build but the Gurney's is somewhat smaller and more compact than the wedge-tailed eagle with rich yellow feet, a rather shorter rounded or faintly wedge-tipped tail, shorter and relatively broader wings (in adaptation to more forest-living). Furthermore, the Gurney's eagle has a much paler immature plumage. Although usually considered an island endemic, the Gurney's eagle is possibly capable of marine dispersals, as is the wedge-tailed eagle, that may lead to them to turn up in the forests of northern Australia and historical reports show that a rare vagrant of the species may indeed appear there. The Papuan eagle (Harpyopsis novaeguineae), the only other island raptor in New Guinea that approaches the wedge-tailed in size, is a highly distinct and forest-restricted species, being much paler, particularly below, with long, bare legs and different proportions, more like a giant Accipiter with short rounded wings, a long, somewhat rounded tipped tail, and a large, rounded head.

=== Vocalizations ===
Wedge-tailed eagles are not well known for its vocalization nor are they often heard. They may be silent for long stretches of time, possibly months, at least outside of breeding season. When vocalizations have been documented, it usually only near the nest and in aerial display, and can be hard to hear unless at close range. The commonest calls for wedge-tailed eagles are high, rather thin whistles, sometimes transcribed as I-see, I-see followed by a short descending see-tya. Also documented during the breeding season are various other whistles, yelps and squeals and an often rolling series. Characteristically, all their calls are surprisingly weak, though the main call is sometimes considered to have a "melancholy" quality. The opinion on their call is not dissimilar to the golden eagle, whose voice is similarly considered unimpressive. Female calls in wedge-tailed eagles are similar but are generally lower and harsher than males.

== Range and habitat ==
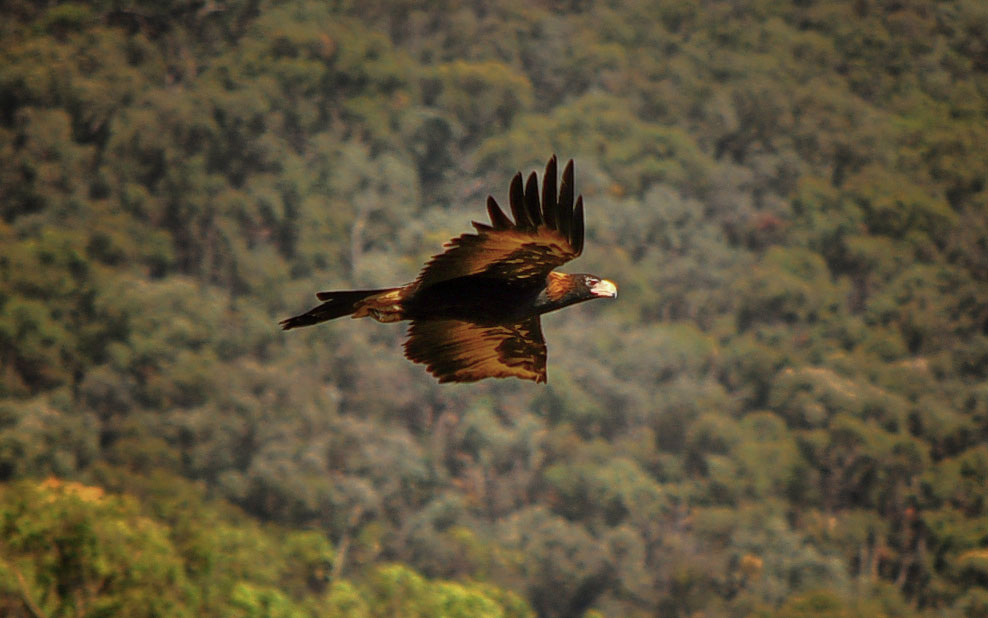
A wedge-tailed eagle seen over well-wooded environments around Kergunyah

Wedge-tailed eagles are found throughout Australia (including Tasmania), as well as southern New Guinea, in almost all habitats, though they tend to be more common in favourable habitat in southern and eastern Australia. In Australia, they may be found almost all the way from the Cape York Peninsula in the north down to Wilsons Promontory National Park and Great Otway National Parks in the southern tips of the continent, and from Shark Bay in the western side of the continent to Great Sandy National Park and Byron Bay in the east. They are widespread throughout the desert interior of Australia, but are rare in low densities in the most arid parts of the continent, such as the Lake Eyre Basin.

Offshore, the wedge-tailed eagle may be distributed in several of the larger Australian islands and some of the smaller ones. Those include a majority of the Torres Strait Islands, Albany Island, Pipon Island, the isles of Bathurst Bay, many small isles in Queensland, from Night Island down to the South Cumberland Islands, Fraser Island, Moreton Island, North Stradbroke Island, Montague Island, Kangaroo Island, the Nuyts Archipelago, Groote Eylandt and the Tiwi Islands. In Tasmania, they may be found essentially throughout as well as some isles of the Kent Group, Bass Strait, Flinders Island and Cape Barren Island. In New Guinea, the wedge-tailed eagle is highly range restricted and can be found predominantly in the Trans-Fly savanna and grasslands and the general area around the Western Province, as well as in Indonesia Merauke Regency, with some isolated reports in Western New Guinea, the Bensbach River and the Oriomo River.

=== Habitat ===
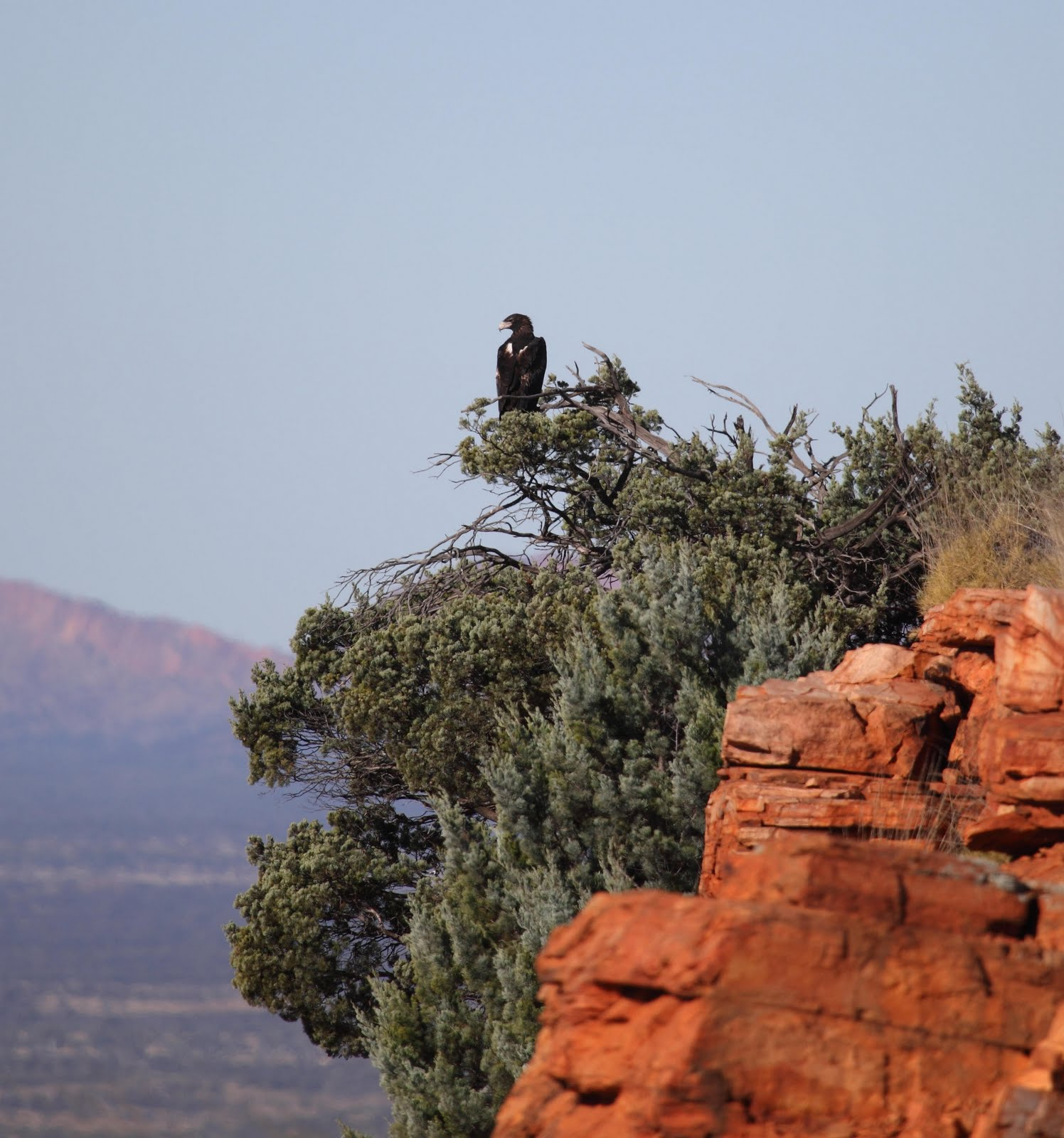
Wedge-tailed eagles favor varied environments, mostly those with some leafy trees and rocky areas, but can be seen in a great variety of habitats.

The wedge-tailed eagle lives in an extremely wide range of habitats. Although range is restricted relative to the golden eagle, it likely occupies a wider range of habitat types than likely any other Aquila eagle, and may outrival any booted eagle species in their use of diverse habitats, being somewhat more akin to habitat generalist raptors such as Buteo buzzards. Assorted habitats known to host wedge-tailed eagles includes open woodland, savanna, heathland, grasslands, desert edge and semi-desert, subalpine forests, montane grasslands and mountain peaks, not-too-dense tropical rainforests, monsoon forests, dwarf conifer forests, some wetlands as well as regularly forays to coastal areas, though normally along the coasts they occur around plains somewhat away from the water.

Favored habitat tends to be remote or rough country, at least partially wooded and not uncommonly varied with some rocky spots as well as in shrubland. Wedge-tailed eagles seem to prefer some dead trees to be present. They may occur around Eucalyptus woodland quite regularly, as well as Acacia woodland and mixed woodlands of Casuarina cristata-Flindersia maculosa-Callitris cypresses and also stands of Casuarina cunninghamiana. A strong preference was detected for C. cunninghamiana alternatively with several Eucalyptus species was detected in the Australian Capital Territory, sloping ground allowing good access and access to tall, mature trees being paramount to the eagles in the study. Quite often they will be seen soaring over hills, mountains or escarpments as well as over flat plains, especially spinex grassland. Dense forest is typically avoided with glades and edge often sought out in forested areas. While they do occur in rich riparian woodlands, it is with relative scarcity despite this being where many other raptors of the nation concentrate.

In the deserts of the Lake Eyre basin, they are often seen in gibber plains along treed watercourses and drainage basins, here often concentrated around Eucalyptus in stony creek beds. In the sandy desert areas of Western Australia, wedge-tailed eagles were once reasonably common but have largely vacated the region after the macropod prey they live off of there were all but hunted to extinction. Wedge-tailed eagles commonly occur from sea level up to about 2,000 m (6,600 ft) with seemingly no preference based on altitudinal level. A fairly pronounced liking for mountainous localities such as plateaus has been detected in a few studies of wedge-tailed eagle. One of the few habitat types considered to be strongly avoided by wedge-tailed eagles are areas intensively settled or cultivated areas. A slightly fading tendency to avoid human areas has been detected, perhaps as persecution rates have gone far down, and the wedge-tailed eagle may be seen near towns and villages in exurban and even suburban areas largely within bushland. However, the species is seldom seen other than as a flyover in more developed towns and cities. Additionally, it is not uncommon to see these eagles in man-made spots such as pasture areas, forestry clearings, and rolling farmland areas.

== Behaviour ==
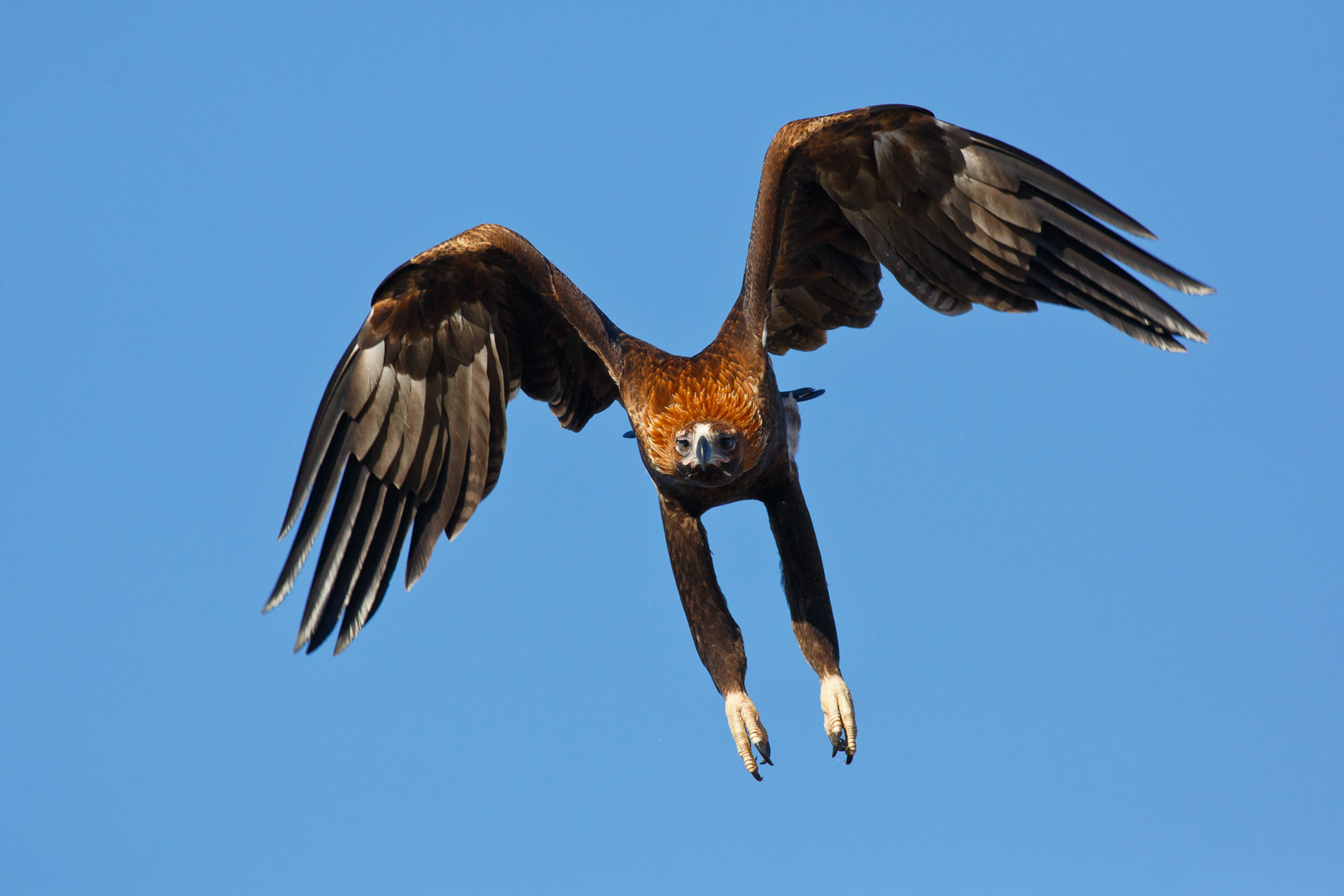
Taking off from its perch, the long legs of this adult female are clearly visible.

The wedge-tailed eagle spends much of the day perching in trees, on rocks as well as similar exposed lookout sites such as cliffs from which it has a good view of its surroundings. Alternatively, they may sit on the ground for long periods of time or watch from a lower point, such as on termite mounds or anthills. Now and then, it takes off from its perch to fly low over its territory. When not breeding, wedge-tailed eagles spend a considerable amount of the day on the wing. Wedge-tailed eagles are highly aerial, soaring for hours on end without wingbeat and seemingly without effort, regularly reaching 1,800 m (5,900 ft) and sometimes considerably higher. The purpose of soaring has received little specific study in wedge-tailed eagles, but it is likely, as in other accipitrids, in large part for surveying the territory and advertising their presence to other eagles. During the intense heat of the middle part of the day, it often soars high in the air, circling up on the thermal currents that rise from the ground below. Often when on the wing, it is scarcely visible to the human's naked eye. Their keen eyesight extends into ultraviolet bands. With a visual perception some three times more acute than those of humans, one of the largest pecten oculi of any bird and an eye roughly as big as a small human's, they may be one of the most sharp-eyed birds in the world.

The wedge-tailed eagle is largely sedentary as expected of a raptor dwelling in the subtropics, although they also dwell in the tropics (far northern Australia and New Guinea) as well as in the temperate zone (Tasmania). However, juveniles of the species can be quite dispersive. In some cases, they have moved to a recorded distance of some 836 to 868 km (519 to 539 mi). These extreme movements have been completed within 7 to 8 months after dispersal. More typically they move no farther than 200 km (120 mi) or so. The adult eagles can also be nomadic, though only in circumstances such as drought conditions. In turn this explains the species presence in places they do not breed, even adults. In addition to moving for drought in arid zone, also moves in highest part of New South Wales, e.g. the Snowy Mountains, the species often apparently vacates snow-covered alpine zone in winter. The small New Guinea population is apparently indistinguishable from the mainland race and so possibly result of recent colonization, although no records exist of migrating wedge-tailed eagles islands past the Torres Straits. However, it can be projected from its presence in various offshore islands its capacity for crossing straits ranging up to as far as 50 to 100 km (31 to 62 mi) apart. One post dispersal young eagle was observed to distribute from Kangaroo Island to the mainland, possibly a regular occurrence. Due to their tendency for wandering, some authors class the wedge-tailed eagles as a "partial or irruptive migrant". However, while they are arguably irruptive, it does not fit the mould of a true migrant well since under normal circumstances adults are rather sedentary unless environmental changes force them to move.

The wedge-tailed eagle is the only bird that has a reputation for frequently attacking hang gliders and paragliders, although other eagles including the golden eagle have also been recorded to behave thusly. Based on the response the eagles show to the gliders, they presumably are defending their territory and treating the perceived intruder like another eagle. Cases are recorded of the birds damaging the fabric of these gliders with their talons as well as some other parts of the gliding apparatus, but not the humans themselves, has been reported. They have also been reported to attack and destroy unmanned aerial vehicles used for mining survey operations in Australia.

The presence of a wedge-tailed eagle often causes panic among smaller birds and, as a result, aggressive species such as magpies (one of the most vulnerable types of passerine to eagle attacks), butcherbirds, wagtails, monarch flycatchers, lapwings, and miners as well as smaller birds of prey, including both accipitrids and falcons, any of which may aggressively mob eagles (see video). Multiple species may join the mob, especially while the eagles perched, often engaging in noisy calling, presumably meant to disorient the predator, and occasionally in physical attacks against the eagle, typically focused where the big, relatively lumbering eagles could not grasp the attacking birds. The wedge-tailed eagle usually does not engage its tormentors but sometimes rolls in the air to present talons whether perched or not. Sometimes wedge-tailed eagles appear to fight but this and other behaviours, especially between young eagles, may be interpreted as playful. Some such behaviours have included fetching sticks tossed by others, athletic flipping between juvenile eagles and even playing games with dogs, via floating above them until the dogs bark or leap then floating up until the dog settles and then repeating the "game".

Flocking behaviour has been noted, similar to that of vultures (Cathartidae and Accipitridae) in other countries, when carrion is available.

In flight, 'mobbed' by Australian magpie, Dayboro, SE Queensland

Samsonvale, SE Queensland, Australia

== Dietary biology ==
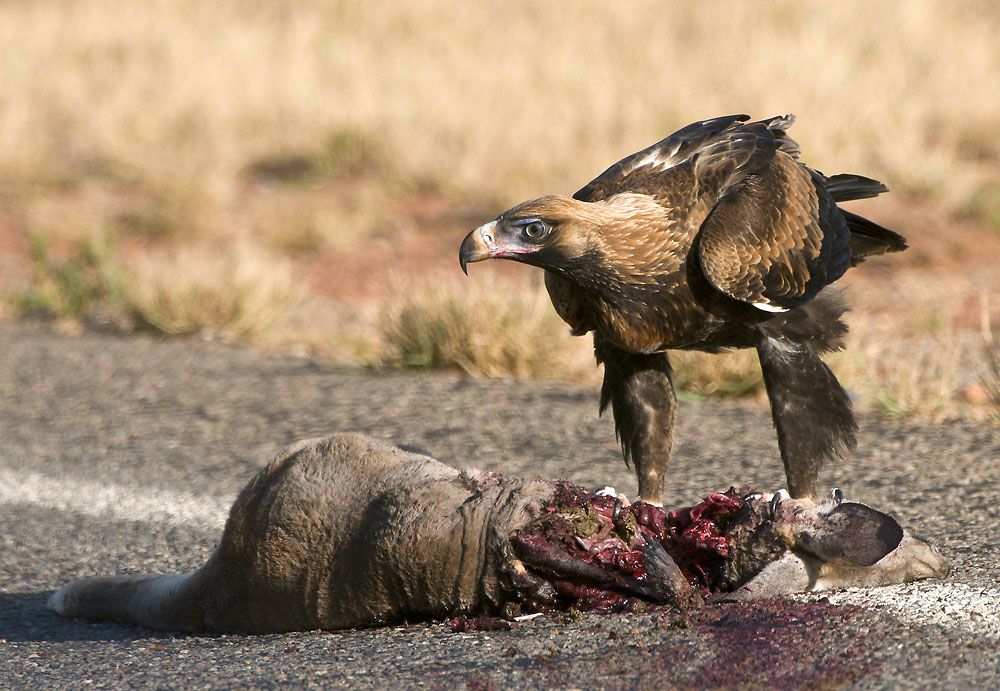
A wedge-tailed eagle standing on roadkill carcass of kangaroo in the Pilbara region of Western Australia

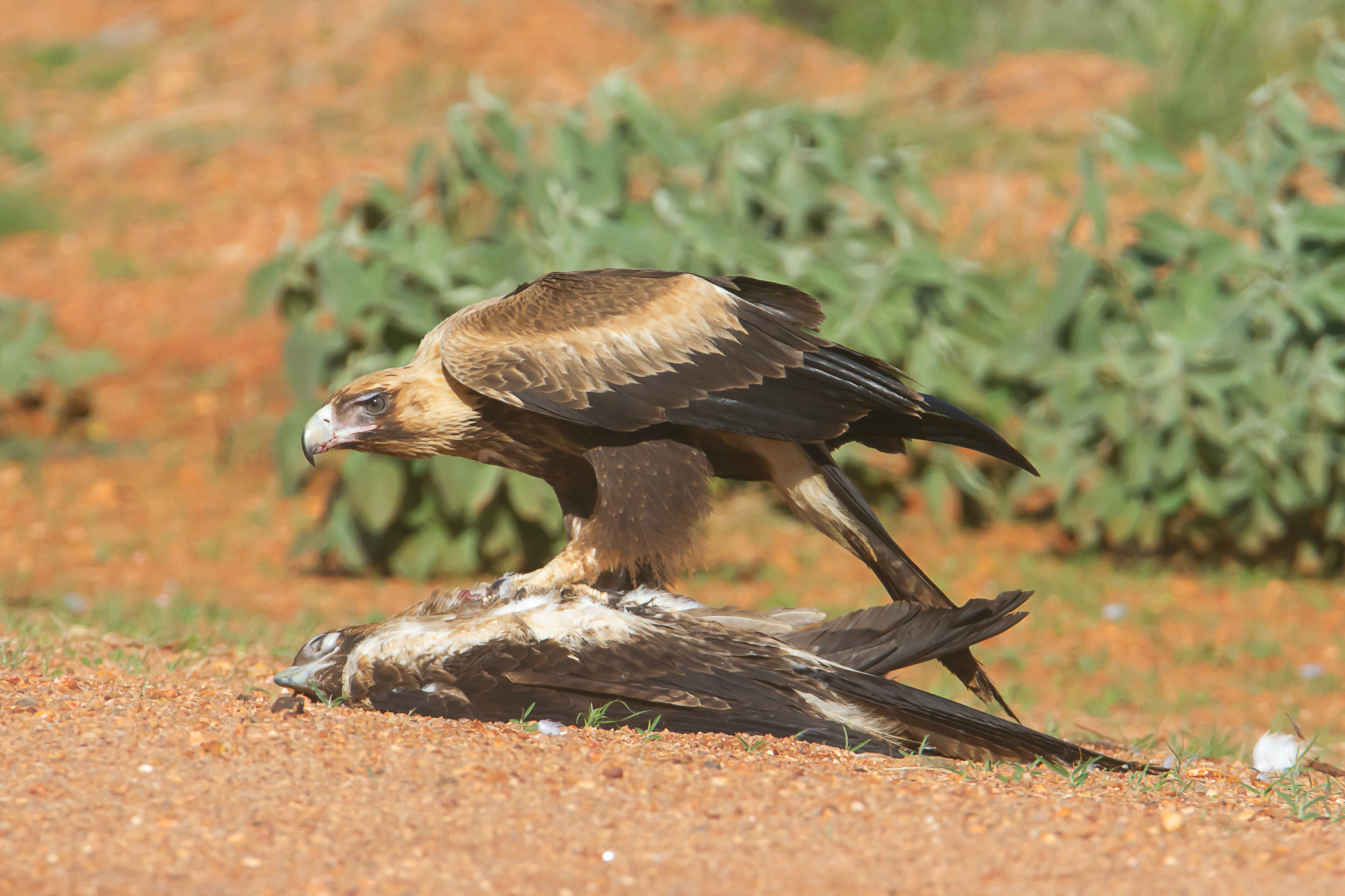
Cannibalizing a wedge-tailed eagle roadkill, killed when itself was feeding on a kangaroo roadkill

The wedge-tailed eagle is one of the world's most powerful avian predators. Due to its formidable and dominating nature, it is sometimes nicknamed "King of Birds", along with golden eagles. Prey is usually grabbed via a pounce or snatch during a gliding flight or a tail-chase from low quartering or transect flights. Prey is not infrequently spotted from a soaring flight and they may undertake a long, slanting stoop towards it. They may be able to spot prey from farther than a kilometre given their keen vision. Its typical hunting style is not all-together dissimilar from that of golden or Verreaux's eagles. Occasionally, a wedge-tailed eagle still hunts from a perch. Unsuccessful hunts typically exceed in number successful ones.

Hunting habitat can be highly variably and can manage to capture prey in both open country and quite thick woodland or forest, though typically require an open understory in the latter. Almost all its prey is taken on the ground but to a lesser extent it may be taken from the tree canopy. They have been known to take birds such as currawongs and cockatoos by coming around them by surprise around a tree or by darting out in flight at close range for a brief tail-chase. Sometimes, an eagle may pull brushtail possums and other mammals from tree cavities, as well as young birds from a nest. They've been known to follow wildfires to search for fleeing animals or alternately tractors and other farm equipment for the same purpose. Wedge-tailed eagles occasionally pirate food from other predators. An eagle of the species can carry prey of at least 5 kg (11 lb).

Large animals may be attacked by pairs or, occasionally, by groups acting cooperatively. One record shows 15 wedge-tailed eagles hunting kangaroos, two actively chasing at a time, then repeatedly being replaced by two more from the circling group overhead. Regardless of prey size and season, tandem hunts, mainly by breeding adult pairs or sometimes loosely associated young eagles, are not uncommon. Of 89 observed hunts in Central Australia around one-third were cooperative ones. As in other tandem hunting raptors, one eagle typically lies in wait generally unseen while the other eagle distracts and drives the prey towards it. When hunting domesticated prey, they've been seen to land near livestock mothers to intimidate them and separate their young, so they can attack the latter. Sometimes, wedge-tailed eagles may use fences to limit a prey's escape routes. In some cases, these eagles will attempt to force large prey such as kangaroos and dingos to fall off steep hillsides and injure themselves.

At times, wedge-tailed eagles appear to hunt at earliest light or late twilight in order to come upon nocturnal prey such as hare-wallaby and bettongs. These eagles have been seen removing rabbits from traps and eating carrion in bright moonlight as well. At times, remarkably, wedge-tailed eagles have been covering large prey with vegetation, apparently to cache food too heavy to carry. Carrion is a major diet item, also; wedge-tails can spot the activity of ravens around a carcass from a great distance, and glide down to appropriate it. Carrion consumption is recorded in all season and contexts, although generally non-breeding birds are more likely to scavenge and young wedge-tailed eagles, even more so shortly post-dispersal, are thought to be far more likely to scavenge on carrion than adults generally. Wedge-tailed eagles are often seen by the roadside in rural Australia, feeding on animals that have been killed in collisions with vehicles. The importance of carrion relative to live prey has not been greatly studied but away from human development, especially roads, carrion is less likely to be encountered and eagles of all ages must presumably hunt to survive. In general, Australian accipitrids of many species not infrequently come to carrion and they along with large passerines like Corvus species and currawongs probably fulfill the niche that vultures do in other continents to some extent, albeit with considerably less specialization.

Aggregations of wedge-tailed eagles may occur not infrequently at large carcasses, with up to 5–12 eagles or sometimes 20 gathering. A wedge-tailed eagle can gorge up to 1 to 1.5 kg (2.2 to 3.3 lb) at a sitting and, when fulfilled, can lasts for an unusual amount of time, for up to weeks or even a month, before needing to hunt again, apparently due to the warmth of the environment. After feeding they may disgorge a relatively small pellet, 29 to 98 mm (1.1 to 3.9 in) long by 20 to 50 mm (0.79 to 1.97 in) wide and weighing some 8.8 g (0.31 oz). Usually the diet is determined from a combination of reviewing these pellets along with loose prey remains.

=== Prey spectrum ===
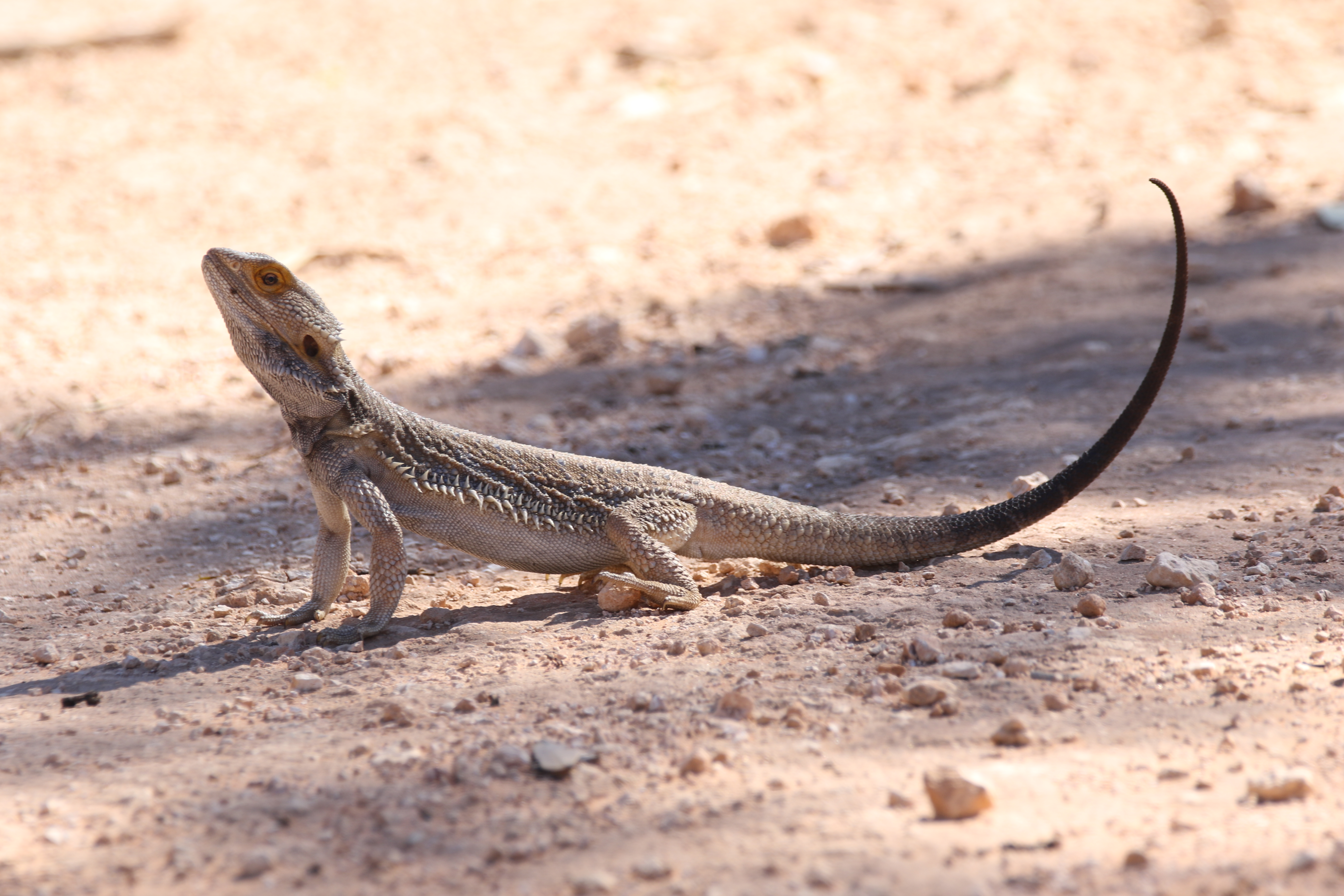
Regular wedge-tailed eagle prey can vary in size down to small lizards such as bearded dragons, their favourite variety of reptilian prey.

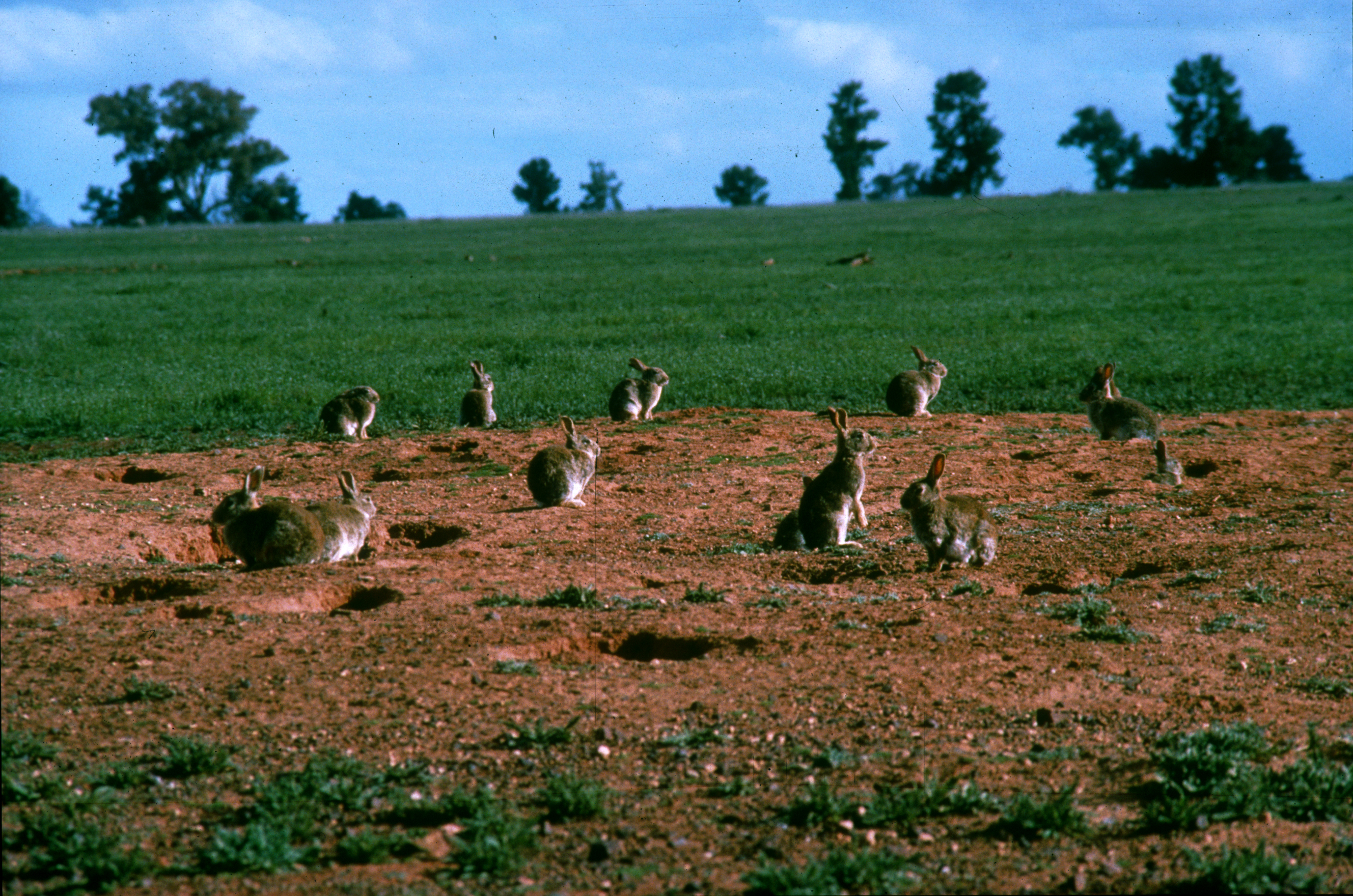
The introduction of rabbits to Australia has been greatly harmful to the Australian environs but a boon to opportunistic wedge-tailed eagles, which often take them in great numbers.

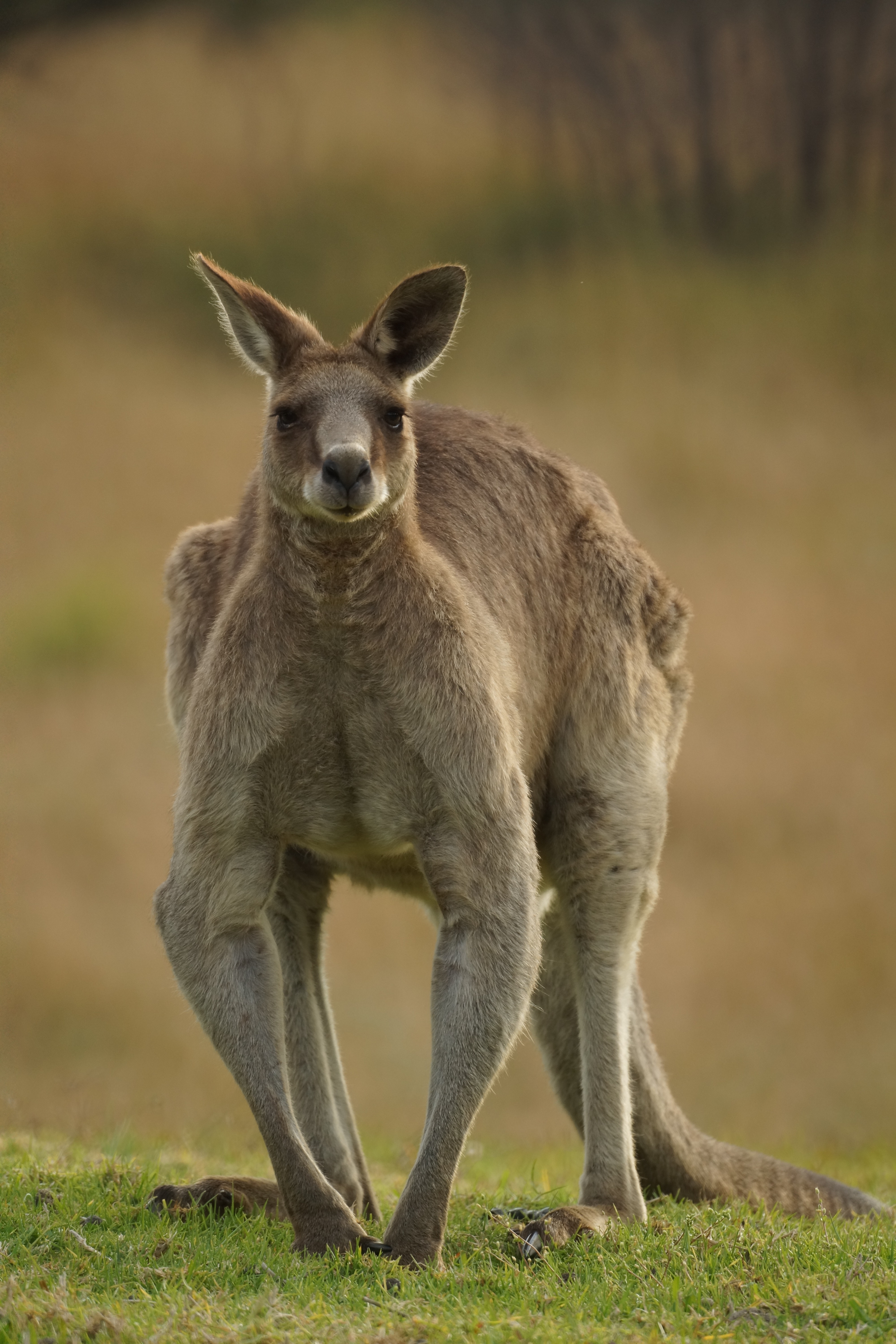
Regular prey can range up to the size of large adult kangaroos such as eastern grey kangaroos, usually attacked in hunting pairs.

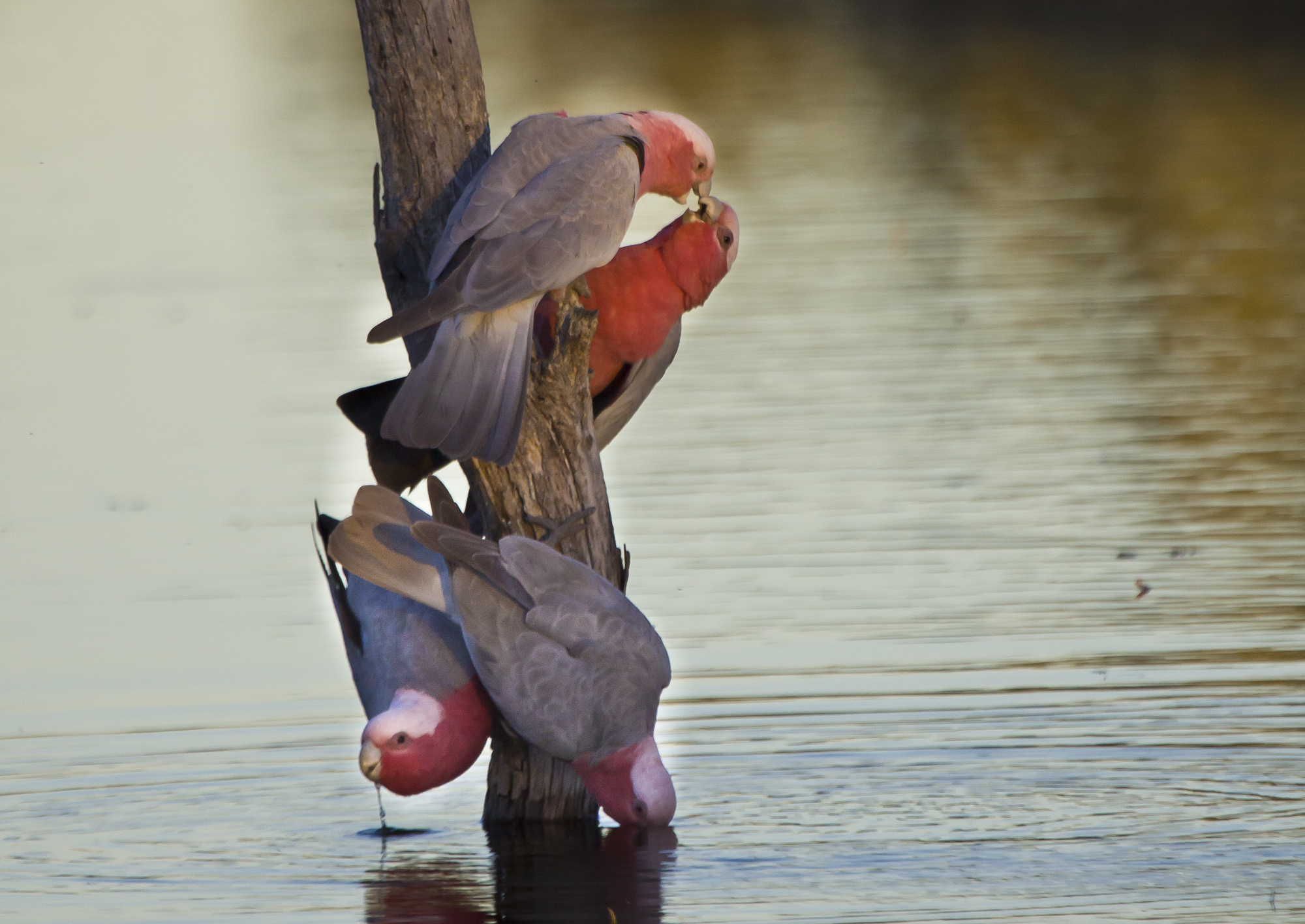
A diversity of birds may be taken with medium-sized, common birds such as galahs taken relatively frequently due to the conspicuousness.

The wedge-tailed eagle is a dietary generalist, opportunistically capturing a wide range of prey species. Its prey spectrum is quite broad, with well over 200 prey species documented to be taken and even this includes very few prey only from secondary accounts from Tasmania and New Guinea. The wedge-tailed eagles tends to prefer smallish to fairly large mammals as prey. However, they not infrequently take ample numbers of both birds and reptiles, along with scarcely other prey taxon. Out of 21 accrued dietary studies, 61.3% of prey items by number in the foods during nesting efforts were mammals, 21.6% were birds, 13.2% were reptiles, 2.1% by invertebrates, principally insects, 1.5% by fish, and almost no amphibians by number. Meanwhile, out of the 21, 13 studies calculated estimated biomass, and found that just shy of 90% of prey biomass was made of by mammals, 6.2% by birds and 3.4% by reptiles. Out of the Aquila genus, it is one of a few generalist species, however the wedge-tailed eagle is the Aquila most likely to typically attack the largest prey. Generally, this species prefers to attack birds and reptiles weighing over 100 g (3.5 oz) and mammals weighing over 500 g (1.1 lb), although prey taken at times has varied from a few grams to more than sixteen times the weight of an individual eagle.

A comparison estimate posited that around 2% of wedge-tailed eagle prey weighs less than 63 g (2.2 oz), 4% of their prey weighs 63 to 125 g (2.2 to 4.4 oz), 7% of their prey weighs 125 to 250 g (4.4 to 8.8 oz), 10% weighs 250 to 500 g (8.8 to 17.6 oz), 20% weighs 500 to 1,000 g (1.1 to 2.2 lb), 25% weighs 1,000 to 2,000 g (2.2 to 4.4 lb), 18% weighs 2,000 to 4,000 g (4.4 to 8.8 lb) and 14% weighs over 4,000 g (8.8 lb). Projected from this comparison, the mean prey size for wedge-tailed eagles is estimated at 1,750 g (3.86 lb), similar but just slightly ahead of the Verreaux's eagle and some 14% ahead of the golden eagle global mean prey size. Further studies estimated mean prey weight, showing the mean prey weigh in the Canberra-Australian Capital Territory region in three different studies was estimated to be 1,298 g (2.862 lb), 2,131 g (4.698 lb) and 2,890 g (6.37 lb), changing likely due to the shifting significances of leporids and larger macropods. In a small study from Armidale, New South Wales, it was estimated that mean prey weight was 1,309 g (2.886 lb). It only ranks behind the crowned eagle and harpy eagle and rivals the martial eagle as the eagle likely to attack the largest prey on average.

==== Mammals ====
===== Introduced mammals =====
While the introduction of invasive species to Australia has been generally having a negative to devastating effect on native animals and ecosystems, the wedge-tailed eagle is one of a few native species to largely benefit from these introductions. This is especially due to the introduction of the European rabbit, which were deliberately introduced largely so the wealthy could hunt them. The wedge-tailed eagles quickly took to the rabbits as prey along with another introduced leporid, the European hare (Lepus europaeus). In almost every part of Australia, these eagles take rabbits in some numbers and they usually constitute the bulk of the prey species in most, if not all, Australian food studies. In some dietary studies rabbits have accounted for up to 89.2% of the diet by number and 86% by biomass, as in Bacchus Marsh, however they more typically range from 16% to 49% of the diet by number in various studies.

One Canberra study found that 98.5% of the rabbits taken were adults. In the largest study near Canberra, over 5.5 years, 19.3% of the diet of wedge-tailed eagles was rabbits (12.7% of prey biomass) among 1421 prey items, so the eagles took a total of some 275 rabbits in the 11 to 17 studied territories of the area. A study estimated that mean weight of wild rabbits in Australia was 1.4 kg (3.1 lb), lower than estimated in the past. However, other studies estimated the mean weights of rabbits taken by wedge-tailed eagles as variously from 1.5 to 2.2 kg (3.3 to 4.9 lb) or "usually over 1.65 kg (3.6 lb)", infrequently reported to 2.47 kg (5.4 lb), size of the rabbits being perhaps limited the poorly-suited soil and environs of the Australian wilderness. Meanwhile, the European hare is neither as widely established nor as prolifically taken as rabbits by wedge-tailed eagles but are by no means neglected and a substantial meal. With a mean body mass of 4 kg (8.8 lb), hares have been as much as nearly 10% of the local diet and up to 14% of prey biomass in studies. Rabbit haemorrhagic disease was deliberately introduced to control the population of rabbits subsequent to 1995, followed more effectively by introduction of myxoma virus to limit the damage rabbits have inflicted on native vegetation and resultingly have competed native mammals like wallabies out of parts of their range. Ultimately, the rabbit population may have more than halved and locally have been some 90% reduced. As a matter of consensus, the wedge-tailed eagles do not appear to be adversely affected in major ways by the biological control of rabbits since they can revert to primarily taking native prey species quite readily. In the region of Broken Hill, White Cliffs and Cunnamulla, rabbits have gone down from accounting for 56–69% of the diet to 16–31% of it. Furthermore, wedge-tailed eagles have been known to successfully maintain population in the absence of any rabbits in a few areas.

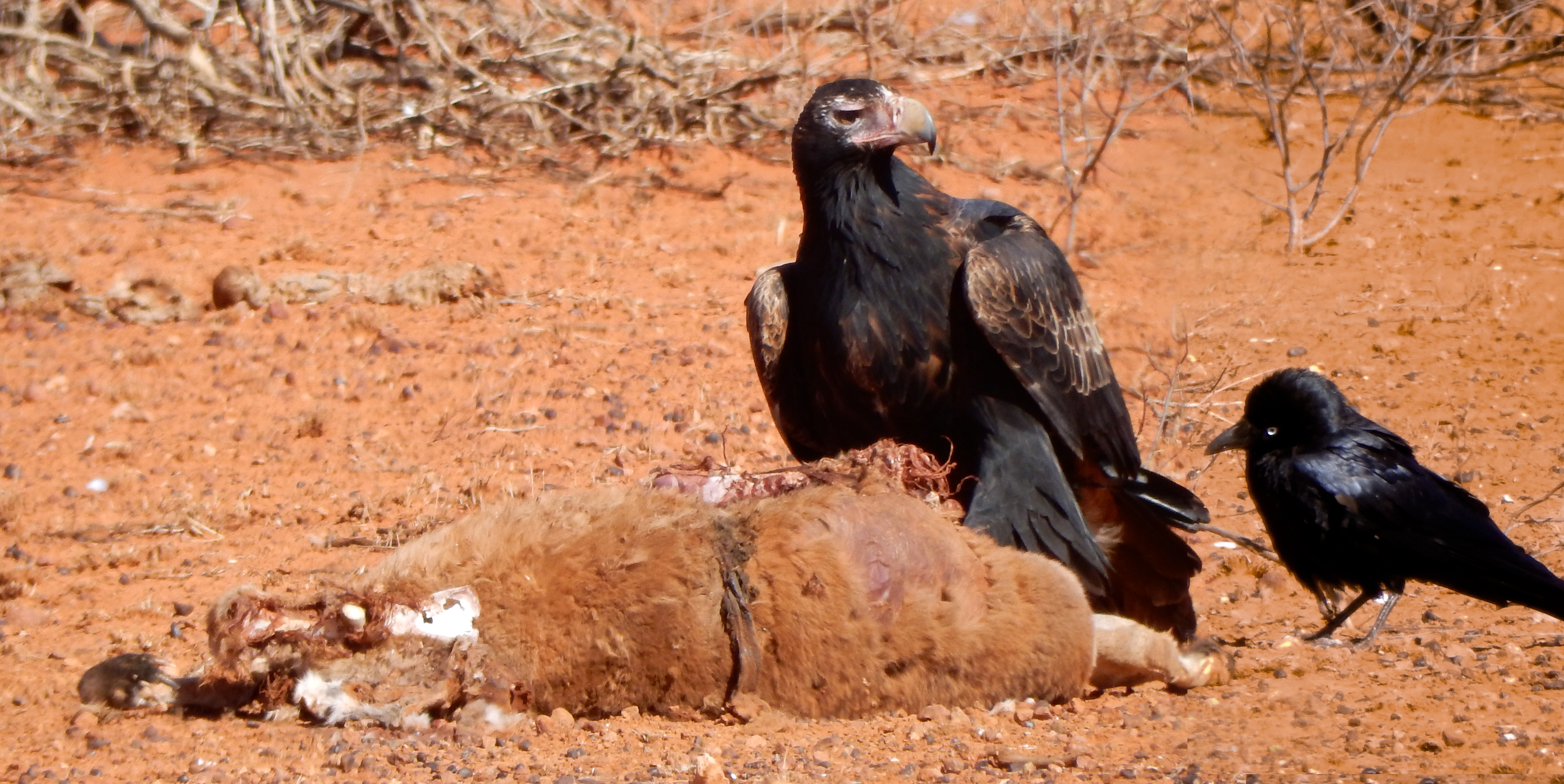
Wedge-tailed eagles are disproportionately likely to be seen eating carrion of roadkills (killed by cars). In the wild they often capture live prey. They often tolerate sharing carrion with other scavengers, such as ravens, despite them being prey species as well.

Much more controversial at one time than hunting introduced rabbits and hares is the wedge-tailed eagle's occasional tendency to feed on and sometimes kill domesticated livestock animals. The predation of wedge-tailed eagles on young farm animals has been the primary historic driver for the persecution of the species. However, in no known study have domestic livestock been known to be primary prey. The closest association with them was in northwestern Queensland where lambs (Ovis aries) made up 32.7% of prey in pellets and 17.1% in remains, accounting for 15–21% of the prey biomass, while juvenile pigs (Sus scrofa domesticus) made up 7.3% of pellet remains and 22% of the biomass. Although it can be highly difficult, attempts have been made at parsing out whether the eagles had indeed killed the lambs rather than just lifting or dismantling them after finding them dead, as this eagle quite readily comes to carrion. The findings were that of 29 diagnosable lamb deaths in northwest Queensland, only 34.5% were due to eagle attacks.

The wedge-tailed eagle is at times capable of taking very substantial livestock animals, lambs taken have been estimated to weigh a mean of 3.5 kg (7.7 lb) or up to 15 kg (33 lb) while fully grown sheep weighing some 40 to 50 kg (88 to 110 lb) are infrequently vulnerable, presumably in large part to hunting pairs of eagles. In the largest study of the Canberra area, 82.5% of diagnosable sheep specimens were adults but probably were by and large scavenged. Meanwhile, young pigs included in the diet were estimated to weigh around 14 kg (31 lb), and sometimes feral piglets are included in the diet. When attacking lambs, the wedge-tailed eagles are apparently capable of driving their talons into the skull of the victim, although more typically they land along the back and grip the lamb along the spine until it weakens and collapses while flapping the wings for balance. This species will also land between a ewe or female pig and their respective lambs or piglets in order to separate the latter for attack. Wedge-tailed eagles are also known to at times prey on another animal introduced for human hunting purposes, the red fox (Vulpes vulpes), which can form up to about 4% of an eagle's breeding diet and 5% of the biomass, weighing up to 9 kg (20 lb). In Canberra, about 59% of the foxes found in the diet were adults. Additionally, feral cats and dogs, mainly juveniles, can be part of their prey.

===== Native mammals =====
Presumably, the primary native prey of wedge-tailed eagles is marsupials, particularly macropods, which is also in accord with studies involving places where rabbits have declined or never occurred. Many wallabies, kangaroos, and associated animals are included in the diet, with over 50 marsupials known to be in the species' prey spectrum. When selecting marsupials, wedge-tailed eagles tend to ignore smaller species and focus on larger-sized ones. However, they generally most often take alive the young, small and sickly of large macropod marsupials. Findings were that juvenile macropods were taken out of proportion to their numbers in the environment, unlike rabbits which were taken roughly in proportion to their abundance.

In recent times, they have been known to eat marsupials, such as kangaroos killed by cars. There is little evidence that macropods delivered to nests are usually roadkills or from carrion, but the source of prey is difficult to determine because, to minimize disturbance, examinations are usually done after breeding is complete. As well, the attendance at carrion by wedge-tailed eagles is disproportionately done by juvenile eagles. In one study of roadkills in Australia, the species ranked around fourth in frequency and capacity for carcass breakdown of scavengers at roadkills, behind feral pigs, red foxes, and ravens.

A video surveillance study at the nest determined that seemingly freshly killed, albeit usually quite young macropods were delivered to nests near Broken Hill. As much as 20% to 30% of the diet can be made up of by macropods. Large and prominent species are known including the grey kangaroos and the red kangaroo (Osphranter rufus). Generally, juveniles are targeted of these large species with eastern grey kangaroos (Macropus giganteus) estimated to weigh 17.2 to 20 kg (38 to 44 lb) when taken by wedge-tailed eagles, in Australian Capital Territory and New South Wales, while the weight of young western grey kangaroos (Macropus fuliginosus) was said to be 3.8 kg (8.4 lb) in one study in Western Australia. The estimated weight of juvenile red kangaroos taken was 9 kg (20 lb) in northwestern Queensland where they were the primary prey species ahead of lambs. However, wedge-tailed eagles do not shy away from attacking large, adult macropods. Similarly large adult macropods killed by these eagles can include common wallaroos (Osphranter robustus) (mean adult weight around 25 kg (55 lb)), antilopine kangaroo (Osphranter antilopinus) (mean adult weight around 30 kg (66 lb)), agile wallaby (Notamacropus agilis) (median adult weight around 16.8 kg (37 lb)), black-striped wallaby (Notamacropus dorsalis) (median adult weight around 13 kg (29 lb)), red-necked wallaby (Notamacropus rufogriseus) estimated to weigh around 16 kg (35 lb) when taken, swamp wallaby (Wallabia bicolor) (mean adult weight around 15 kg (33 lb)), and even red kangaroo adults.

Wedge-tailed eagles have been recorded attacking eastern grey kangaroos weighing over 35 kg (77 lb). In extreme cases, they have killed kangaroos weighing approximately 60 kg (130 lb). In one case, a huge male eastern grey kangaroo, estimated to stand 1.7 m (5 ft 7 in) was successfully dispatched by a pair of wedge-tailed eagles. Furthermore, an adult female western grey kangaroo was witnessed to be killed "in a few minutes" by a hunting pair of wedge-tailed eagles, and the eagles are considered a serious predator of the western grey. In some unusual cases, wedge-tailed eagle hunting parties can form whilst hunting red kangaroos, sometimes including up to 15 eagles (more loose, opportunistic aggregations than well-organized groups), but usually only a pair is sufficient to kill such prey. Normally, the eagles repeatedly attack the kangaroo, sinking their talons into the back or nape and then fly up, when the second eagle starts doing the same. In some cases, as many as 123 attacks have been carried out against large kangaroos before they succumb. When attacking joeys, eagles may, in some cases, have intentionally caused a mother kangaroo to dislodge a joey from the pouch to capture and fly off with it.

In addition, several smaller and more elusive macropods are taken including tree-kangaroos, hare-wallabies, nail-tail wallabies, rock-wallabies, dorcopsises and pademelons. Other marsupials are by no means neglected. In Shark Bay, hare-wallabies and bettongs seem to form the central part of the diet. Another dietary favourite is the common brushtail possum (Trichosurus vulpecula), weighing some 2.55 kg (5.6 lb), which was important supplemental prey in the Perth area and was the primary prey species on Kangaroo Island, at 33% of the diet there. Around Perth, other small, nocturnal marsupials were taken in some numbers including woylies (Bettongia penicillata) and southern brown bandicoots (Isoodon obesulus). The common ringtail possum (Pseudocheirus peregrinus) was the second most prominent prey species in the diet near Melbourne, comprising 20.1% of the diet, with some numbers of common brushtails also taken there. Long-nosed bandicoots (Perameles nasuta) were regular supplemental prey in northeastern New South Wales. Other notable marsupials known to fall prey to wedge-tailed eagles include adults of the following: koalas (Phascolarctos cinereus), quokkas (Setonix brachyurus), eastern (Dasyurus viverrinus), western (Dasyurus geoffroii) and tiger quolls (Dasyurus maculatus), Tasmanian devils (Sarcophilus harrisii), bilbies, numbats (Myrmecobius fasciatus), common wombats (Vombatus ursinus), southern greater gliders (Petauroides volans) and potoroos.

With relative infrequency, other classes of mammals, beyond leporids and marsupials, may be taken opportunistically by wedge-tailed eagles. At least two species each of flying foxes and wattled bats are included in the prey spectrum. Occasionally, an eagle may take a monotreme including both the platypus (Ornithorhynchus anatinus) and the short-beaked echidna (Tachyglossus aculeatus). Several species of rat are readily taken and even the house mouse (Mus musculus), likely the smallest mammalian prey known for wedge-tailed eagles at around 20 g (0.71 oz) in weight. Although rare, a dingo (Canis familiaris) may be taken by a wedge-tailed eagle at times, mostly pups, or carrion but sometimes a pair of eagles can kill adults too. Beyond sheep, pigs, and infrequently young goats (Capra hircus), other ungulate prey, entirely introduced by man into the Australasian region, is eaten exclusively as carrion so far as is known, including cattle (Bos taurus - despite claims that eagles have killed young calves, which is possible, they have only ever been witnessed feeding on afterbirths and not harming calves), Javan rusa (Rusa timorensis) in New Guinea, sambar deer (Rusa unicolor) in northern Victoria and water buffalo (Bubalus bubalis) in the Northern Territory. In one instance, a young girl was apparently subject to a brief attack by a wedge-tailed eagle, in what was likely an attempted act of predation, near her rural home but the attack was abandoned by the eagle. It has been noted that some different species of large eagles are thought to occasionally attack children as prey though, among extant species, only the crowned eagle and martial eagle, both in Africa, are thought to have successfully carried out rare acts of predation on human children.

==== Birds ====
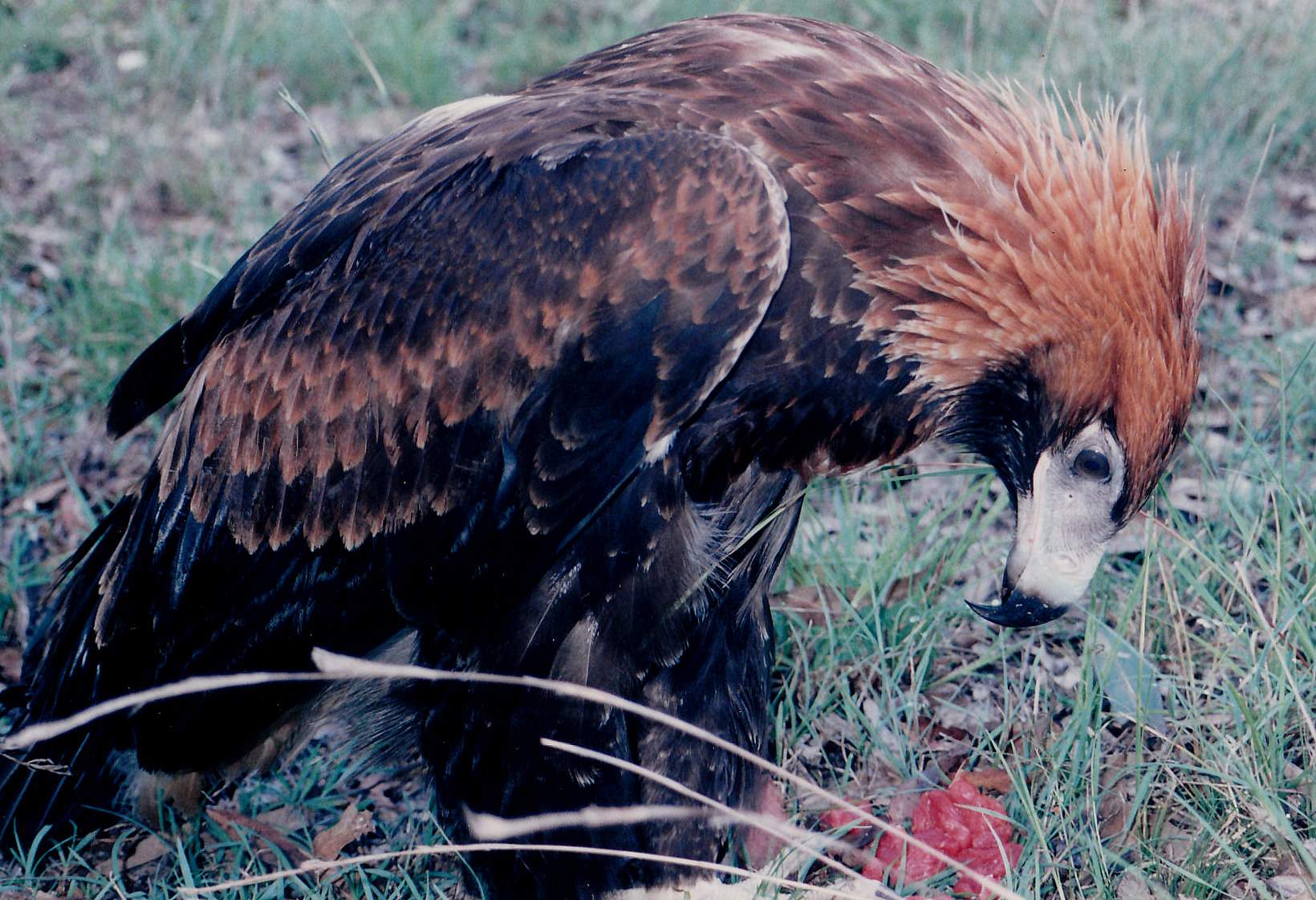
A wedge-tailed eagle feeding

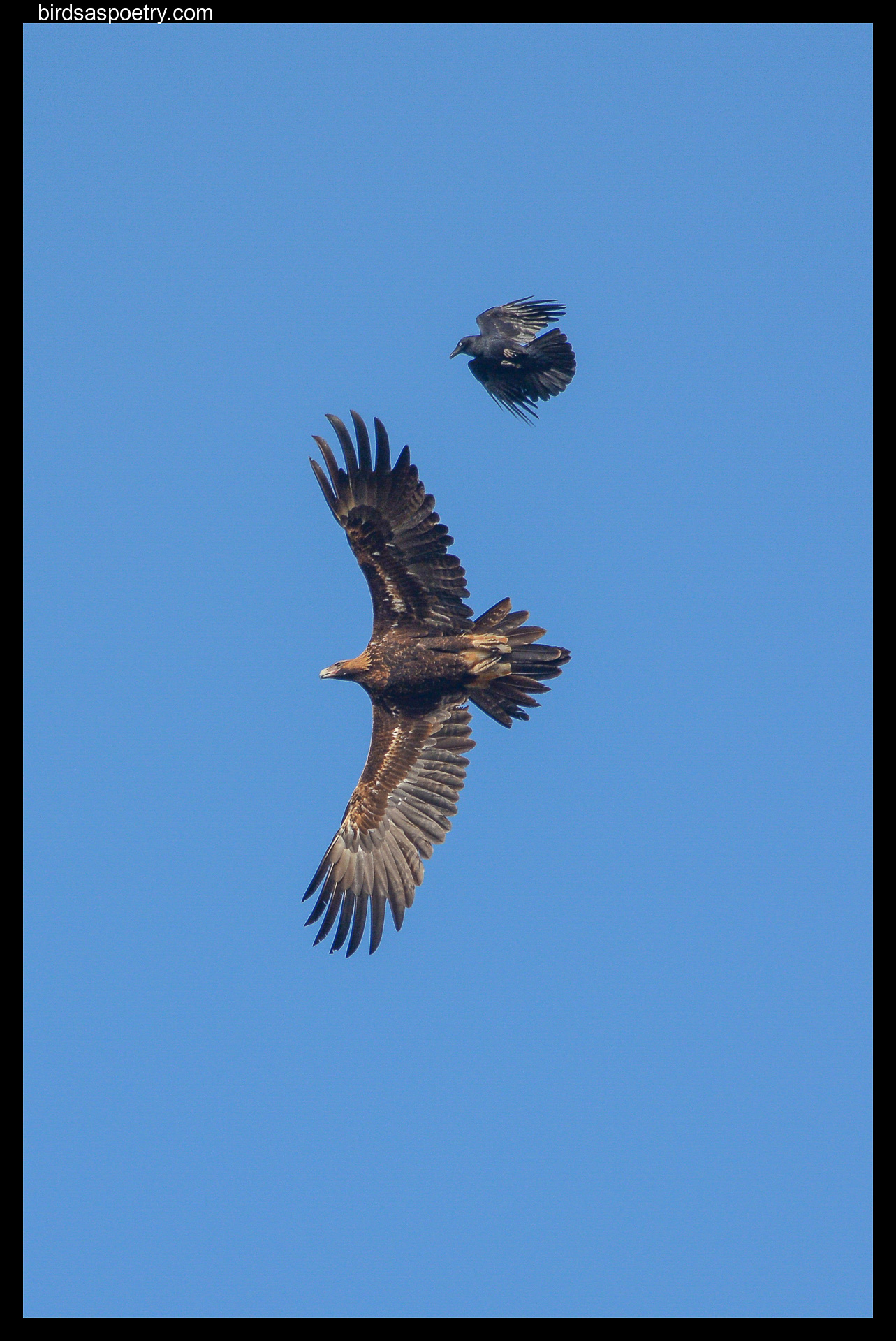
A raven mobbing a wedge-tailed eagle, the latter being an opportunistic predator of many birds

Birds take a clearly secondary position to mammals when importance and especially prey weight are concerned; however, the wedge-tailed eagle shows some fondness for avian prey. With more than 100 prey species included in the prey spectrum, birds are the most diverse class of prey taken by these eagles. Generally, the predation of birds seems to be highly opportunistic and no one type of bird reliably dominates the eagle's diet. However certain species, probably due to their commonality in eagle territories and perhaps vulnerability through their own behaviour that seem to be taken most often. These consist of Corvus species, especially little (Corvus mellori) and Australian ravens (Corvus coronoides), weighing a mean between species of around 580 to 590 g (1.28 to 1.30 lb) when taken, 300 to 329 g (10.6 to 11.6 oz) Australian magpies (Gymnorhina tibicen), 800 to 820 g (1.76 to 1.81 lb) Australian wood duck (Chenonetta jubata), 310 to 335 g (10.9 to 11.8 oz) galah (Eolophus roseicapilla), larger cockatoos and smaller parakeets and parrots.

On Kangaroo Island, Australian and little ravens together constituted 19% of the diet. In Canberra, fairly prominent numbers of magpies, wood ducks, galahs and eastern (Platycercus eximius) and crimson rosellas (Platycercus elegans) are known to be taken, these collectively forming up to about 25% of the diet by number. In the Perth region, birds were taken amply, especially the Australian raven at 12.6% of prey remains and 4.7% of the biomass, with birds constituting just shy of 25% of the diet. Elsewhere in Western Australia, a similar percentage of the diet is made up of by birds, mostly the same species with some number of Australian ringnecks (Barnardius zonarius) and Baudin's black cockatoos (Zanda baudinii) as well. Peculiarly, one study found that among a large sample of 1826 prey items in the Northern Territory that the most often identified prey species was the tiny budgerigar (Melopsittacus undulatus), at 29 g (1.0 oz) one of the smallest avian prey species for this eagle. In a single study from the Fleurieu Peninsula, birds were the majority of prey for wedge-tailed eagles, at 62.5%, mostly Corvus followed by wood duck, galah and magpies. Other assorted avian prey include several species of waterfowl, including several ducks as well as swans and geese, and a fairly strong frequency of attacks on large rails, such as swamphens, moorhens, native-hens and coots.

Additionally, wedge-tailed eagles may take Australian brush turkeys (Alectura lathami) and malleefowl (Leipoa ocellata), quail, pigeons and doves, frogmouths and owlet-nightjars, cuckoos, buttonquails, stilts, lapwings, plains-wanderers (Pedionomus torquatus), thick-knees, gulls, petrels, cormorants, herons, ibises and spoonbills, cranes, other birds of prey, kingfishers, honeyeaters, quail-thrushes, whistlers, monarch flycatchers, mudnesters, artamids, true thrushes, grass warblers, starlings and pipits. The smallest avian prey attributed to wedge-tailed eagles is the 10 g (0.35 oz) zebra finch (Taeniopygia guttata). Particularly large birds are sometimes taken of a few species. When it comes to the emu (Dromaius novaehollandiae), Australia's tallest and second heaviest bird, wedge-tailed eagles normally attack the small young but are capable of attacking adult emus more than 10 times their own weight. Two estimates estimated the typical body mass of emus attacked were merely 2.42 and 3.32 kg (5.3 and 7.3 lb), respectively, against an average of 34 kg (75 lb) for adult emu. As much as 4% of the diet of wedge-tailed eagles can consist of emu chicks. Some of Australia's largest flying birds are also included in the wedge-tailed eagle's prey spectrum. These include the black swan (Cygnus atratus), estimated to weigh 5 kg (11 lb) when taken, black-necked stork (Ephippiorhynchus asiaticus), which weighs at least 4.1 kg (9.0 lb), and brolga (Antigone rubicunda), arguably Australia's largest resident flying species of bird at a mean of 6.23 kg (13.7 lb). An unusually close feeding association with a very large bird is with the Australian bustard (Ardeotis australis) in northwestern Queensland, where bustards were found to account for 13.4% of the pellet contents and 23% of prey biomass. That study calculated the mean weight of bustards taken as 8.97 kg (19.8 lb), indicating that the eagles were selectively predating the much larger male bustards.

==== Reptiles and other prey ====
When selecting reptiles as prey, wedge-tailed eagles by far are most likely to pursue lizards. The range of lizards they may prey upon is highly diverse in size and nature, with somewhere between 20 and 30 species known in the prey spectrum. The most preferred reptilian prey by far is bearded dragons. Despite the small size of this prey relative to most mammalian prey, they can be key to survivorship in more arid vicinities such as central and western Australia where there is less diverse prey to pick from. In video monitored prey deliveries at Fowlers Gap Arid Zone Research Station, central bearded dragons (Pogona vitticeps) dominated the prey composition, making up 68.2% of 110 prey deliveries and the only known instance of reptiles forming the bulk of wedge-tailed eagle diet. A different study from prey remains and pellets found the central bearded dragon to comprise 28.6% of the diet among 192 prey items. In south-central Queensland, the bearded dragon was the leading prey species by number, making up 26.9% of 729 prey items. In northeastern New South Wales, the eastern bearded dragon (Pogona barbata) was the second most numerous prey species behind the rabbit, at 16.6% of the diet. The bearded dragons when taken by wedge-tailed eagles have had an estimated body mass ranging from 80 to 320 g (2.8 to 11.3 oz). They also prey on jacky dragons.

Larger lizards are readily taken as well given the opportunity. Skinks are occasional supplemental prey, common blue-tongued skink (Tiliqua scincoides) at around 500 g (1.1 lb) can make up around 5% of the diet (in northeast New South Wales), while the 204 g (7.2 oz) Centralian blue-tongued skink (Tiliqua multifasciata) was quite prominent in the diet in the Northern Territory. In Western Australia, 617 g (1.360 lb) shingleback skink (Tiliqua rugosa) and somewhat smaller western blue-tongued skink (Tiliqua occipitalis) collectively comprised about 7.5% of the diet. Much bigger lizards are sometimes taken, namely monitor lizards. Around 20% of the 231 prey items of in a Western Australian study was found to be monitor lizards, mostly 2.32 kg (5.1 lb) yellow-spotted monitors (Varanus panoptes) with some 821 g (1.810 lb) sand goannas (Varanus gouldii). Adult Rosenberg's monitors (Varanus rosenbergi), weighing around 1.1 kg (2.4 lb) can be also taken. Even lace monitors (Varanus varius), which weighs 6.3 kg (14 lb) on average adults, can be a prey for this powerful eagle. Contrarily, lizards down to the size of a 20 g (0.71 oz) pygmy spiny-tailed skink (Egernia depressa) and a 38 g (1.3 oz) thorny devil (Moloch horridus) may be taken.

Beyond lizards, wedge-tailed eagles seldom seem to hunt other types of reptiles. They hunt a few species of snakes, mostly venomous species, because they are prevalent in Australia. Snakes known to be included in the diet including tiger snakes (Notechis scutatus), eastern brown snake (Pseudonaja textilis), ringed brown snake (Pseudonaja modesta), bandy-bandy (Vermicella annulata), yellow-faced whipsnake (Demansia psammophis), red-bellied black snake (Pseudechis porphyriacus) and brown tree snake (Boiga irregularis). Eastern long-necked turtle (Chelodina longicollis) have been claimed as prey in one report although any other confirmed cases of predation on turtles by this species are not known. Notably, there are no reports of wedge-tailed eagles attacking pythons, despite several species being present in Australia, nor on crocodiles; perhaps these are the only predators too formidable to be attacked, as both of these reptiles can attain extremely large sizes. Predation on frogs or other amphibians is almost unheard of for wedge-tailed eagles, however, based on toxicity reports in eagles, they may consume invasive cane toads (Rhinella marina) from time to time. Similarly rare in the species' diet is fish, although common carp (Cyprinus carpio) and western blue groper (Achoerodus gouldii) have been documented as prey. Occasionally, wedge-tailed eagles may even attack insects such as Psaltoda moerens cicadas and Heteronychus arator beetles. Truly exceptional is in the Northern Territory, where a large percentage of 1826 prey items was made up of by insects including unidentified Orthoptera, at about 10.8% of the diet, unidentified beetles, at about 8.4%, as well as some numbers of ants. Why and how they capture a profusion of insects locally is not clear, and they may be often from the stomachs of other prey or even byproduct from the captures of other prey or from the bodies of carcasses.

=== Interspecific predatory relationships ===
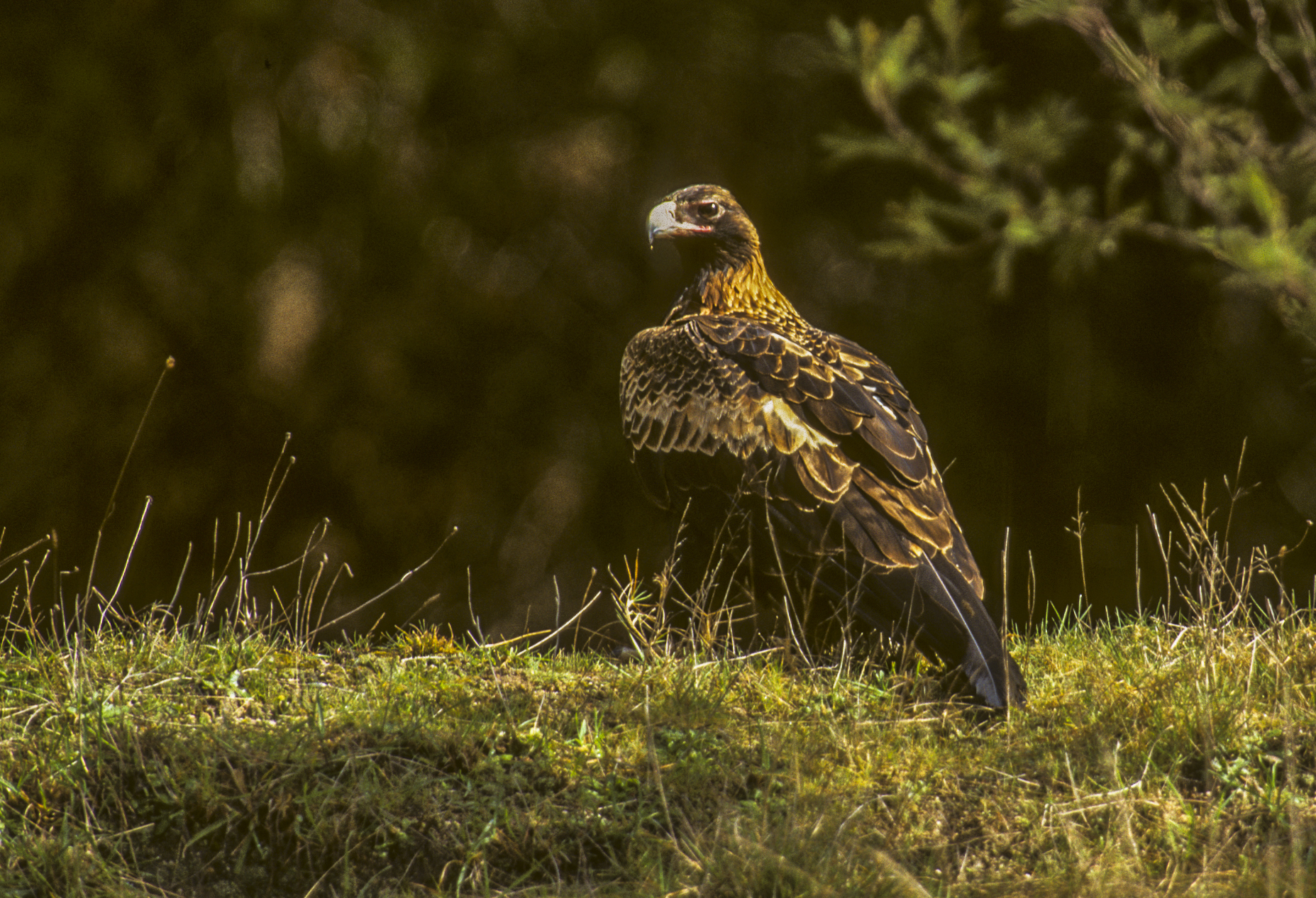
Being the largest and most powerful Australian raptor, wedge-tailed eagles are dominant over other raptor species of the region.

The wedge-tailed eagle occupies a fairly unique niche relative to other Aquila. While primarily continental in distribution, it is distributed well apart from most related species, whereas most Aquila are distributed in Eurasia or Africa and face considerable competition over resources, enabling certain specializations of most species in habitat or microhabitat, morphology and behaviours and often life history, including nesting grounds and often foods. The wedge-tailed eagle has the ability to exploit a more catholic variation of both prey and habitat since it exists with relatively fewer competing species.

The most considerable potential competition comes in the two other eagles regularly distributed in Australia, the little eagle and white-bellied sea eagle. The little eagle has a few ecological similarities to the wedge-tailed eagle. It is also something of a habitat generalist, although it is found somewhat scarcely in more arid vicinity, high elevation areas and varied semi-open forest than the wedge-tailed eagle. Like the wedge-tailed eagle, the little eagle has in recent decades become a somewhat specialized predator of European rabbits. However, the size difference is extreme between the wedge-tailed and little eagles, with the earlier over four times heavier than the latter, and the little eagle as expected exploits a lower trophic level relative to its more powerful competitor. As in other areas where booted eagles and sea eagles have abutting ranges, sometimes wedge-tailed eagles compete with white-bellied sea eagles.

One key difference from elsewhere where competition sometimes occurs such as the golden eagle with the white-tailed eagle (Haliaeetus albicilla) in Eurasia and the bald eagle (Haliaeetus leucocephalus) in North America, both of which are slightly heavier than the golden, is that the white-bellied sea eagle is the slightly smaller species than the wedge-tailed eagle, potentially giving the latter a more pronounced competitive edge. However, the white-bellied sea eagle clearly does not shy away from contentious border disputes with wedge-tailed eagles and the two species can often be seen be seen readily attacking each other, occasionally in talon grappling and sometimes cartwheeling attacks on one another. However, the ecological effect of interspecific competition of the two species is not clear. Although the wedge-tailed eagle is considered the dominant species of the two, they clearly do not take the presence of white-bellied sea eagles lightly and some authors feel they may avoid nesting near them. Clearly, there is ample partitioning between the wedge-tailed and white-bellied sea eagles, the latter adapted to mostly open wetlands and coasts and, while also a dietary generalist, they tend to derive most of their diet from fish, water birds and other wetland-dwelling prey, and they seldom compete directly for prey such as mammals with wedge-tailed eagles.

Most other diurnal raptors that reside in Australia are considerably smaller and seldom can be said to present great competition to the wedge-tailed eagles, although some, such as swamp harriers (Circus approximans), black-breasted kites and grey goshawks (Accipiter novaehollandiae), are relatively large for their taxon and powerful predators in their own rights. In one instance, a square-tailed kite (Lophoictinia isura) was observed to engage in an apparent territorial fight with a wedge-tailed eagle, including talon-grappling. When it comes to carrion, wedge-tailed eagles tend to dominate other predators, especially most birds, with most kites, other assorted raptors and some large passerine birds, mainly Corvus species and butcherbirds, coming to dead animals including roadkills. However, heavier terrestrial meat-eaters can hold their own at times against wedge-tailed eagles, namely red foxes, dingos, monitor lizards and Tasmanian devils, despite all these species sometimes turning up as prey of these eagles as well.

Sometimes the wedge-tailed eagle will readily rob various other raptors of their prey, including little eagles, white-bellied sea eagles and brown falcons (Falco berigora). Wedge-tailed eagles will opportunistically prey on other birds of prey. They share this aptitude with other large eagles in different parts of the world such as golden eagles, although such acts are relatively infrequent, it is clear that the wedge-tailed eagle is considered a primary threat by many raptors based on witnessed attacks by eagles on them and the mobbing behaviour of other raptors. Among the other birds of prey known to occasionally fall prey to these eagles are little eagles, collared sparrowhawks (Accipiter cirrocephalus), grey goshawks, brown goshawks (Accipiter fasciatus), Pacific bazas (Aviceda subcristata), black-breasted buzzards, peregrine falcons (Falco peregrinus), Australian hobbies (Falco longipennis), black falcons (Falco subniger), brown falcons and nankeen kestrels (Falco cenchroides).

Occasionally owls are also included in the prey spectrum when an opportunity arises, including barn owls (Tyto javanica), southern boobooks (Ninox boobook) and even powerful owls (Ninox strenua). Wedge-tailed eagles are apex predators and have no well-documented predators, although presumably they have some nest predators, likely including ravens and currawongs, especially when displaced by human disturbance from their nests. Occasionally, these eagles may possibly risk injury or death in conflicts against other powerful predators and scavengers, such as dingos, quolls, Tasmanian devils, goannas and snakes, but no such verified instances seem to be known in literature, and man is considered to be the wedge-tailed eagle's only true threat. Occasionally they may be injured and even killed via intra- and interspecies territorial conflicts and mobbing by other birds of prey, especially stooping peregrine falcons which have successfully knocked wedge-tailed eagles out of the sky, with a force known to kill both golden and bald eagles in other parts of the world. Due to the formidable aerial attack of the peregrine, it may be the only raptor besides the white-bellied sea eagle that wedge-tailed eagles may avoid nesting near. Most of the large falcons, including peregrine, brown and black falcons, and at times large owls nest in unused or abandoned wedge-tailed eagle nests.

== Breeding ==
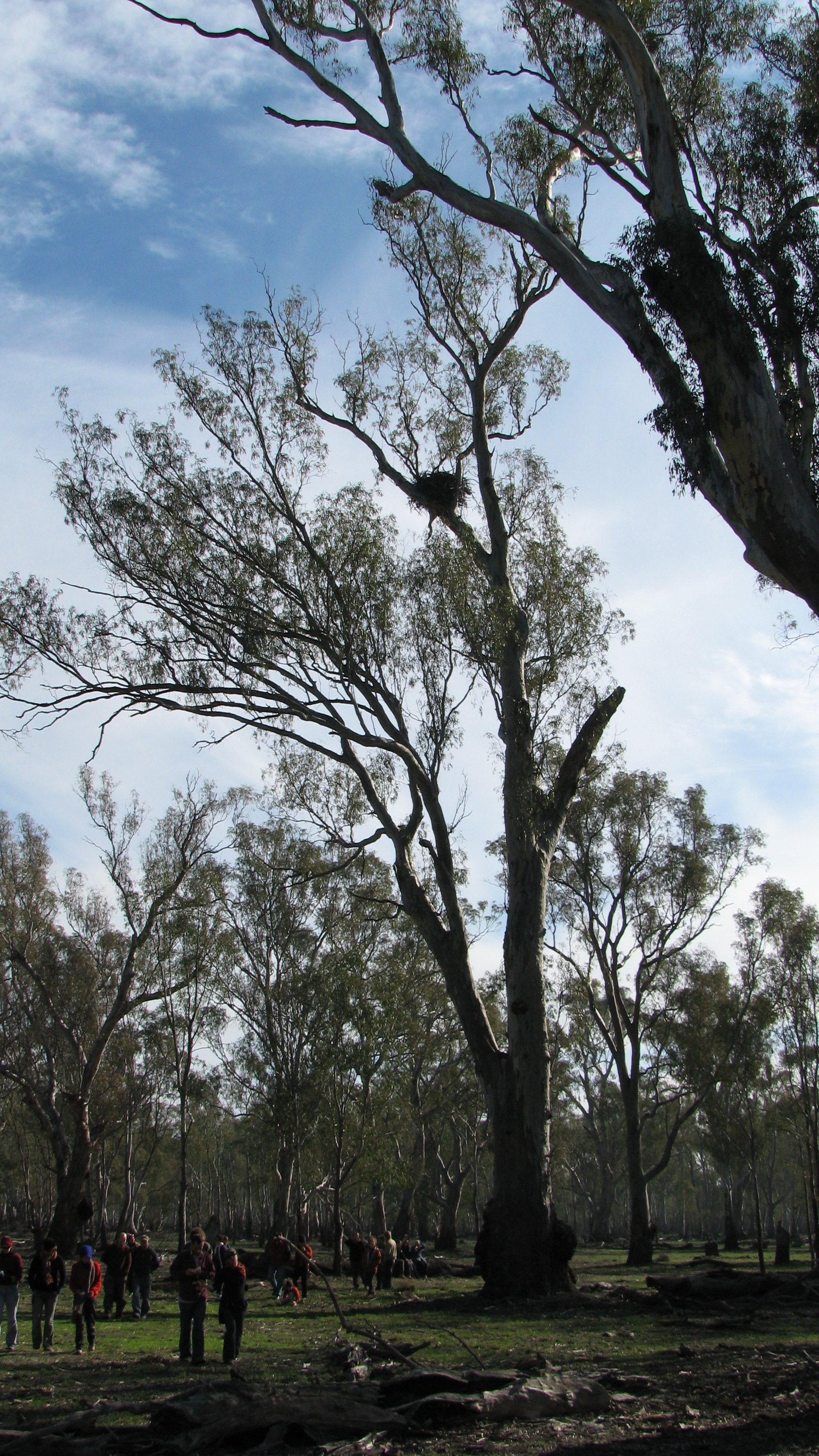
A wedge-tailed eagle nest in Barmah National Park

The breeding season is from July to December through much of range, in New Guinea apparently from May on. They have a distinct tendency to lay earlier in the more northerly part of the range. For instance, in northeastern Australia laying has been recorded in January and February and in Tasmania in September. In western Australia, breeding depends on food and during drought periods there may be no nesting for up to 4 years. Adult wedge-tailed eagles are usually solitary or occur in pairs but immatures are more gregarious. 10–15 young wedge-tailed eagles may rest or soar together or even hunt together and up to 40 have been recorded at once at a carcass. Mated adults perform mutual soaring, undulating dives, and tandem flights with rolling and foot-touching. The female may appear to ignore or more often turn over and present claws when a male is displaying. As possibly part of courtship, feedings on pairs have taken place away from the nest and sharing of a cache of food may occur.

Allopreening occurs occasionally between pairs but is seldom observed, although at times has been considered a "regular" part of the courtship process. Contrary to historical accounts, wedge-tailed eagles seldom engage in an elaborate courtship display and will instead generally try to conserve energy, instead devoting their energy for the upcoming trying breeding season along with territorial exclusions of conspecifics and obtaining food. Mating tends to occur on a bare branch or dead tree in the nest area, and may continue into the nestling period. Contrary to old accounts, the species does not mate in flight. In the pre-laying phase, mating was recorded to be preceded or accompanied by loud, slow yelping, but in the nestling period, the pair alighted together and the male mounted without preliminaries and a silent copulation lasted for one minute.

=== Territories and home ranges ===
Territories are established with aerial displays, which can include high circling by one or both of pair, sometimes interspersed with flight rolls and talon presenting. Most of the time, wedge-tailed eagles typically respect pair boundaries and can limit territorial behaviour to mild aerial flights, with the intruders usually giving the ground to incumbents. Violence is usually avoided but sometimes the most heated territorial disputes can escalate to deaths. Sometimes the displaying eagle may engage in a steep dive on part closed wings followed by an upwards swoop, later may escalate into spectacular sky dance with undulations; they may too loop-the-loop. Cartwheeling is typically rare but in one case, three immatures mock dived at each other, two birds interlocked and cartwheeled several times before breaking away. No cartwheeling or talon grappling has been reported between members of a mated pair, but occasionally reported as used against intruding eagles. Aerial displays may go on for a while normally early in the breeding season, between 3 months and 3 weeks prior to egg laying.

Territorial attacks by male wedge-tailed eagles may be against any encountered intruding eagles, including both male and female intruders, while female eagles engage in less territorial attacks and when they do, it is exclusively against other females. Territorial aggression can extend towards hang gliders and aircraft, advances noisily, bill open and talons extended until flying just above and behind or slightly ahead of pilot then swoops repeatedly after making contact with the hang-glider. A core of some 1 km (0.62 mi) radius around the nest is most fervently defended. Foraging ranges from nest may be up to about 20 km^{2} (7.7 sq mi). Foraging ranges on breeding home ranges may be around 50 km^{2} (19 sq mi) for males and 20 km^{2} (7.7 sq mi) for females in arid central western Australia. Range sizes of pair members vary greatly based on topography, habitat and prey access. Several reported densities of 3–6 pairs per 100 km^{2} (39 sq mi), others of 7–12 pairs per 100 km^{2} (39 sq mi). When rabbits were in plague type numbers, pairs may nest as close 700 m (2,300 ft) apart and 4 others no more than 2 km (1.2 mi) from those two pairs. In semi-arid areas of New South Wales near Menindee densities were found to be about a pair per 53 km^{2} (20 sq mi), 10–12 pairs in good years, 3 in drought years. Not far from that in Mutawintji National Park density was around a pair per 3 to 9 km^{2} (1.2 to 3.5 sq mi). Much higher densities were noted in this semi-arid zone of western New South Wales, with a pair per 3 to 9 km^{2} (1.2 to 3.5 sq mi), against around a pair per 40 to 48 km^{2} (15 to 19 sq mi) in other arid zones.

In Western Australia, arid areas had a nearest neighbour distance of 5.32 km (3.31 mi) while those nesting in mesic areas had a distance of 4.88 km (3.03 mi). At Fowlers Gap, there were 9–10 pairs per 390 km^{2} (150 sq mi). Near Canberra, around 37 pairs were reported in an area of 1,000 km^{2} (390 sq mi), including some unusually as close as 130 m (430 ft) to paved roads and as close as 260 m (850 ft) from suburban spots. This contrasts strongly with 36 years prior, when few nests were near human-altered areas and the amount of pairs in the same area was about 32. In the Fleurieu Peninsula in South Australia during the early to mid 2000s, there was a pair per 53 km^{2} (20 sq mi), active nest sites were 6.6 km (4.1 mi) apart, while the average home range around the nest is 34 km^{2} (13 sq mi) roughly. Resurvey efforts a dozen years later in Fleurieu Peninsula found a more populous population, resulting in a home range estimated at 32.1 km^{2} (12.4 sq mi) with some active nests as close as 1.5 km (0.93 mi) apart. In the Perth area, it was projected that the mean home range was about 36 km^{2} (14 sq mi). Meanwhile, in southern Victoria the nearest neighbour distance of breeding pairs was 4.7 km (2.9 mi) while mean territory size was calculated at 17.6 km^{2} (6.8 sq mi).

=== Nests ===
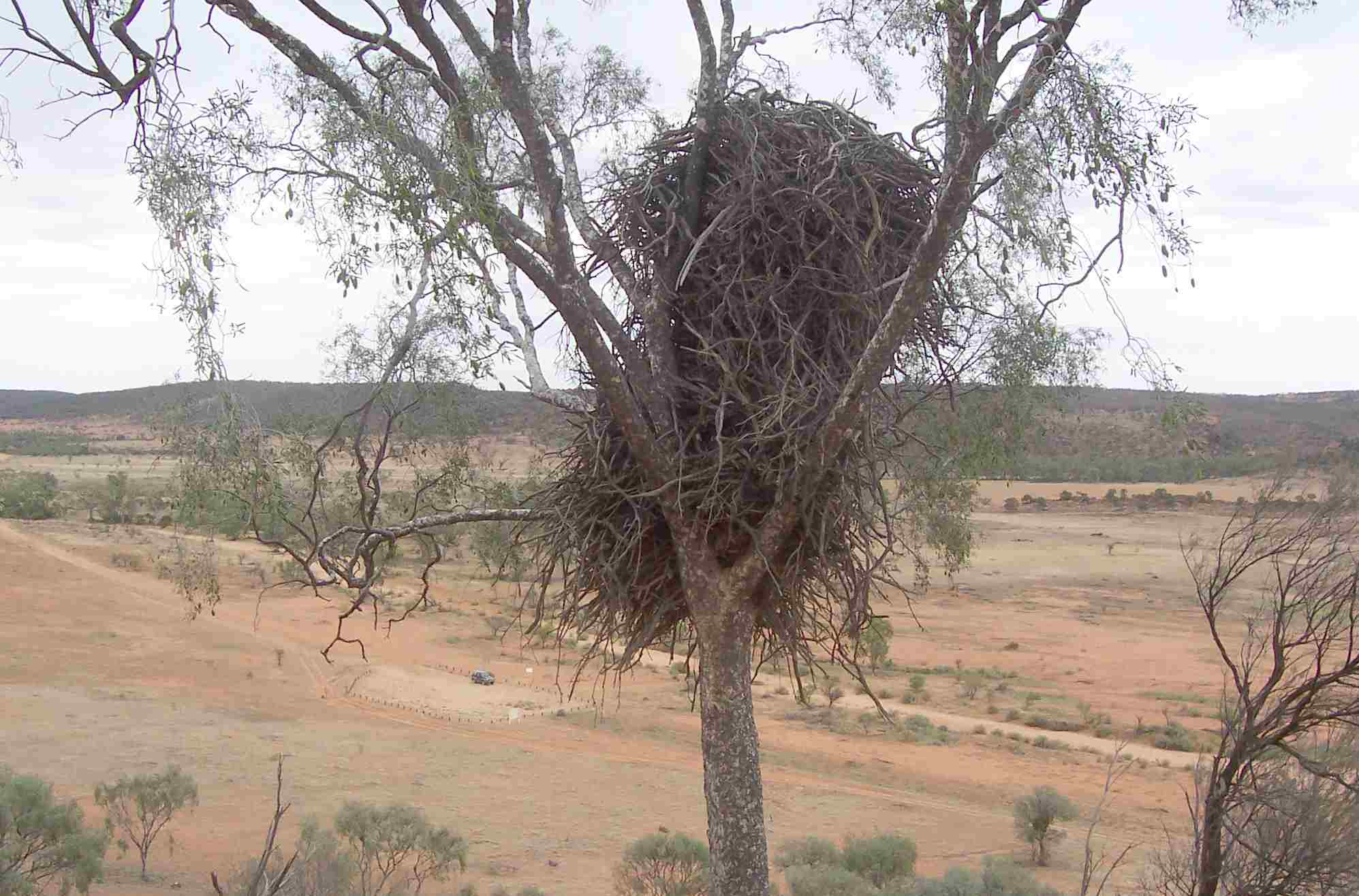
Nest in a leopardwood tree at Mutawintji National Park

Both sexes may participate in building the nest but the female takes the greater share, often standing in the middle and building outwards. Often wedge-tailed eagles build alternative nest, up to 2 to 3 per territory, though when undisturbed uses the same general site repeatedly. In Tasmania, territories held a mean of 1.4 nests. The nest is usually either substantial or massive. The nest is a structure of sticks ranging 70 to 100 cm (2.3 to 3.3 ft) across and 30 to 80 cm (12 to 31 in) deep when first build but with repeated additions up to 2.5 m (8.2 ft) across and nearly 4 m (13 ft) deep. The interior nest cup is commonly around 30 to 40 cm (12 to 16 in) across about 10 cm (3.9 in) deep. Four studies found the diameter of nests to average from as little as 1.1 m (3.6 ft) and as much as 1.9 m (6.2 ft) and in depth from as little as 1 m (3.3 ft) to as much as 1.3 m (4.3 ft). Generally speaking in woodland or forest edge areas, nests tend to be larger, while those in sparser, more arid areas tend to have characteristically smaller nests, as they have lesser access to nest building materials.

Good sized nests can weigh well over 400 kg (880 lb). Nests are usually lined with green leaves and twigs, a common practice in accipitrids. Infrequently, they may use an old nest built by another accipitrid, namely whistling kites (Haliastur sphenurus) and white-bellied sea eagles, with the earlier's nests apparently added to in order to enlargen it. Ideally the nest is located at 12 to 30 m (39 to 98 ft) above the ground on a lateral branch or main fork of lone or forest tree; in taller trees, nests can be as much as 75 m (246 ft) high to the opposite extreme down in lower ground or even on rocks or ground trees are scarce. In a few studies different areas of New South Wales, the mean nest height was from 5.2 to 21.7 m (17 to 71 ft) and were often relatively close to human development. Two results in southern Victoria found mean nest heights to be 12.6 and 18.1 m (41 and 59 ft). In often particularly arid Western Australia, mean nest heights were reportedly lower, averaging at 6.5 and 15.5 m (21 and 51 ft). Detailed study in Western Australia found nest heights were higher in Mediterranean scrubland at 4 to 16 m (13 to 52 ft) against 2 to 6 m (6.6 to 19.7 ft) in the arid zone, but nest height seemed to not have bearing on occupancy or success, territoriality kept the population regulated within the habitats. Occasionally they may nest in dwarf trees at as low as 1 to 2 m (3.3 to 6.6 ft).

Favoured nesting trees include many Eucalyptus and Casuarina species, as well as Corymbia, Callitris and Syncarpia glomulifera while in inland areas more often Acacia, Flindersia as well as Hakea leucoptera and Grevillea striata. The amount of Eucalyptus tree species used by wedge-tailed eagles is extremely diverse and ultimately the species seem to have no strong overall preferences regarding tree species, more importantly seeking a given tree of ample height and considerable broadness. Furthermore, nest trees are often on slightly elevated ground above the mean ground level, presumably in order to offer a more commanding view of the surrounding environment. Additionally, trees with fewer lower branches may be preferred. Nests are seldom on dead trees, usually this occurs where there is an absence of leafy ones. While Australian nests can be in quite varied surroundings, Tasmanian nests are almost exclusively within well forested areas. Forest type nests tend to have a sparse, open understory and woodlands or nearby glades often are considered perhaps more attractive to the species. In desert-type areas, they may nest on a hill or a rise, and in addition sometimes cliff ledges, or among rocks, and even on ground in both islands and desert-like areas, preferably in areas difficult for or inaccessible to humans. Additionally they have been known to nest on power pylons and telegraph poles.

Other smaller animals may nest among the sticks at the base of active wedge-tailed eagle nests such as finches, pardalotes and even possums (which more so than the small birds are presumably vulnerable to the eagles if caught in the open), perhaps gaining some protection from the presence of the eagles. This is a not unknown phenomenon in many bird assemblages for small birds to gain incidental protection from strong raptors. Other species, such as Pacific black ducks (Anas superciliosa), falcons and owls, may also benefit by utilizing unused nests for their own breeding purposes, although typically only the falcons usually use them with relative regularity.

=== Development of young and parental behaviour ===
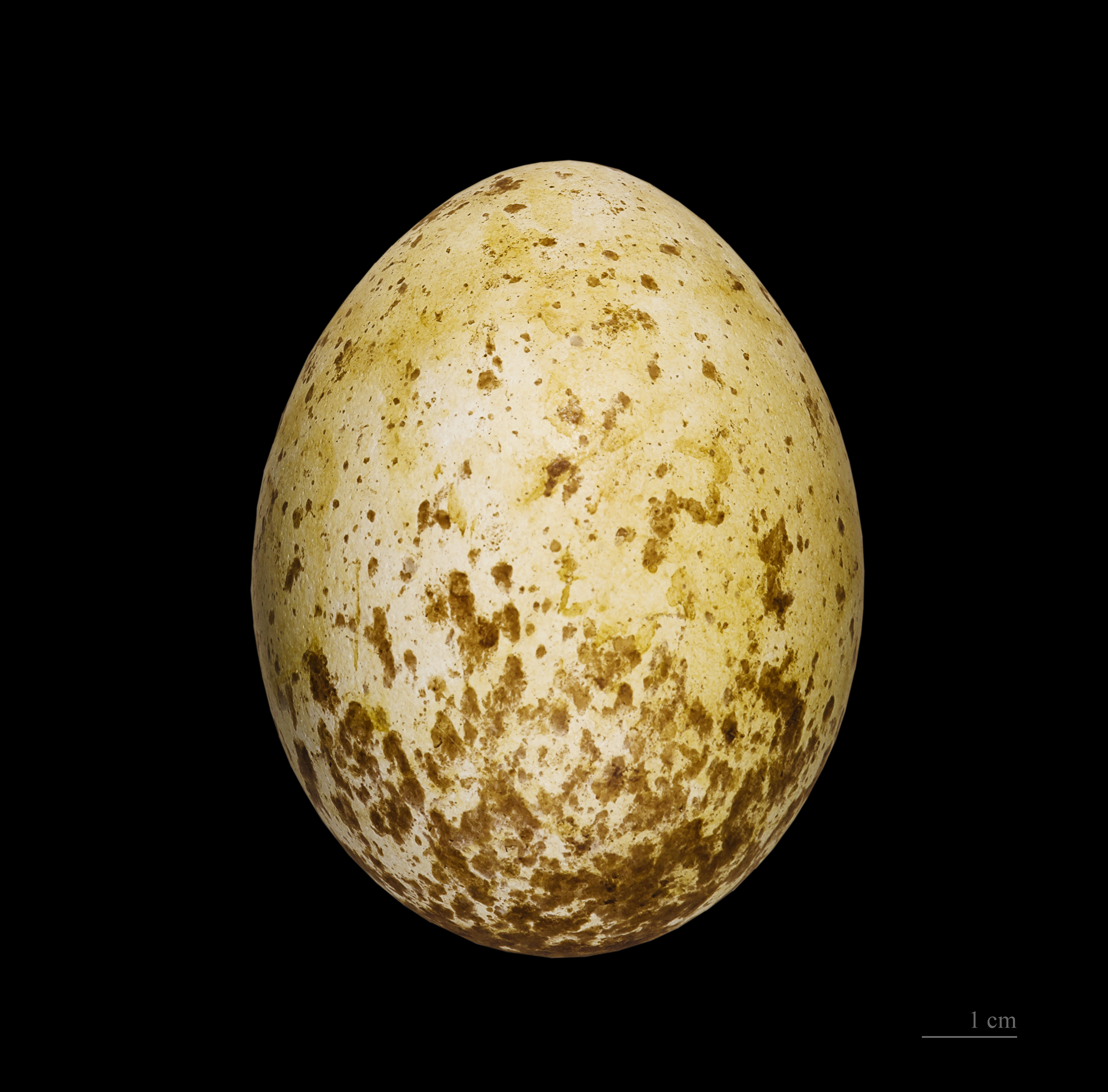
Aquila audax egg – MHNT

Clutch size is usually just one or two but sometimes to 4. About 80% of nests where eagles have managed to lay eggs contain two eggs. Mean clutch size is apparently somewhat higher in the western part of the range. The female lays multi-egg clutches by some 3 days or so apart. The eggs are buff or white in colour, often appearing heavily blotched all over with purple-brown, red-brown or lavender, or more sparsely spotted with reddish brown. The amount of spotting is quite variable on eggs even within a single clutch, some being heavily marked, others hardly at all, and at times concentrated on the pointier end of the egg. When freshly laid, the eggs are glossy but they become more matte and brittle with age.

Eggs may range in height from 66 to 79.3 mm (2.60 to 3.12 in), averaging 73 mm (2.9 in) in a sample of 54, by 55 to 63.5 mm (2.17 to 2.50 in), averaging 58.8 mm (2.31 in). Each egg normally weighs about 120 to 150 g (4.2 to 5.3 oz), the equivalent to about three chicken eggs or about 3% of the female eagle's body weight, 10% when the clutch number is 3, which is typical for an Aquila eagle but a small percentage relative to smaller raptors. The larger eagles of Tasmania lay larger eggs on average reportedly. Wedge-tailed eagles sometimes lay runt eggs in nests in normal nests, in a condition apparently unique for Australian raptors, and these reportedly never hatch. If a clutch is lost or stolen early in incubation, some pairs have been documented to replace it, being able to do so about a month later. The incubation stage lasts for 42–48 days. The female of the pair either primarily or entirely incubates on her own and, like many eagles, she is a tight sitter. However, the male will incubate at times as well, at least up to an hour at a time. In New South Wales, the male was found to incubate for 16–20% of daylight during which the nest was unguarded for 3–13% of the day. In some cases, male incubation may vary from 1–6% of daylight to as much as 38% of daylight with shifts in extreme lasting up to 6 hours. Male primarily delivers prey to the nest during incubation (not prior), up about to the stage where the eaglet(s) can be left unattended.

The chicks are covered in white down up at first and are expectedly semi-altricial. At about 12 days or so, a slightly greyer down develops and this ultimately becomes the woolly undercoat for the contour feathers. Within a couple days later, the black quills of the primaries often start to emerge, and can start to stand and move around the nest. At 28 days, the eaglets are showing their upper wing coverts increasingly through the down. At 35 days of age, some darker feathers are appearing on areas such as the breast, belly, mantle, back and head; mostly these are evident as a few dark rufous feathers poking through the head down while at this age they show a short buff-tipped tail. They are partially feathered up to 37 days and nearly completely feathered by 49 days. At around 37 days, they can attempt to tear food from carcass in the nests without much success. From 50 days onwards, the eaglet(s) play a good deal, pouncing on sticks and degree around the nest. Around this age, they are markedly almost full feathered but for the wing and tail, neither of which has reached its full length, and they may have a few wisps of down about their crown or neck. Weight increases are from about 1.17 kg (2.6 lb) at 15 days with a notably increase in robustness to 2.6 kg (5.7 lb) at 29 days, to 3.2 kg (7.1 lb) at 49 days, making more rapid feathering growth thereafter primarily while body size growth slows considerably.

Sibling aggression tends to begin at very early stage of life and decrease after first week. Unlike related eagles, there is some evidence that higher parental attendance limits instances of aggression, whereas in other eagles this occurs often in the parent's presence. In all eagles, the parent eagles do not attempt to intercede when runting or aggression between siblings occurs. Siblicide occurs occasionally in this species and it is considered a "facultative cainist" rather than an obligate one, meaning siblicide occurs occasionally and as conditions dictate as opposed to some eagles where it occurs almost invariably. Sufficient environmental conditions can largely reduce sibling aggression. In New South Wales, three of four successful pairs raised two fledglings and no sign of rivalry or pecking behaviors observed despite the size difference of two siblings.

The female broods attentively at first but then decreases after the second or third week and then ceases brooding almost entirely by 30 days, even at night. For 40 or more days, the female continues to assist the young with feeding, typically from the male's prey deliveries though the female may resume hunting after nest attendance drops. Potential predators such as goannas are struck when found to be approaching the nest, although the eagles usually abandon the nest when a human approaches. Repeated intrusions and noisy disturbances may have a net negative effect such as on Tasmanian wedge-tailed eagles, as these factors often lead to nest failure. In one case in South Australia, the removal of a dead tree in the vicinity of a wedge-tailed eagle nest resulted in full abandonment of the nest by the parents. The female may too continue to bring green leaves to a late stages, doing so more often in a spell of wet weather. During times of plenty, caches can sometimes form around the nest, with much prey left partially or entirely uneaten. Upon leaving the nest at 11 to 12 weeks of age, the young eagles are not strong fliers for another 20 days or so, but can competent flying can be by about 90 days of ages, though full feather development is not until 120 days. Fledgling occurs at 67 to 95 days, typically being less than 90 days and averaging roughly around 79 days.

Dependence lasts up to 4 to 6 months after fledging, with the juvenile eagles which overstay rarely known to be an occasionally fatal danger to the subsequent chick hatched to their parents. During the later periods of fledgling, interactions are restricted to brief prey deliveries and the parent eagles stop feeding the young eagle(s), forcing to go forage elsewhere for foods. A study of post-fledgling dispersal found in one case that a young eagle covered only a 4.22 km^{2} (1.63 sq mi) range, with a maximum covered in a week of 3.28 km (2.04 mi). Most recoveries in one banding study were distributed under 300 km (190 mi) from their original banding site, mostly as fledgling age juveniles, but some meandered up to 821 km (510 mi) away. After dispersal, young eagles are floaters up until their 4th or 5th year, typically avoiding the territories of adults and searching out feeding opportunities. Up to two-thirds of young wedge-tailed eagles may die some time between fledgling and when they are 3–5 years but adults often have quite low mortality rates and can live the better part of a half century. First breeding is typically at 6 or 7 years old. Lifespans of wedge-tailed eagles in the wild are poorly known, with the maximum recorded in one banding study being merely 9 years, quite a paltry age compared to other large eagles, and it is quite conceivable that eagles who survive to maturity not infrequently live around twice that long or more. In captivity, the species has been known to live to around 40 years of age.

=== Breeding success ===
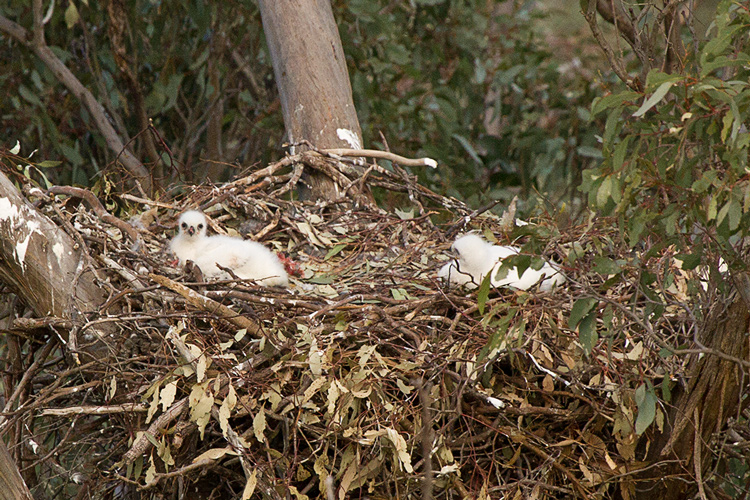
Two chicks in the nest

Only one young is typically produced from a clutch of two but occasionally two fledglings may occur. The breeding success rates of the species are variable. In overall studies, at least 52–90% of breeding pairs managed to produce a fledgling, with further projected numbers from this of 0.2–0.5 fledgling per pair, 0.7–1.2 fledgling per clutch and 1.1–1.3 fledgling per brood. In southwestern Australia, from 0.7 to 1.2 young are fledged per clutch laid, 0.19–0.46 young per pair per year. In south-central Queensland, fledgling productivity was 1.1 per young to pairs that laid eggs. Northern New South Wales eagles were able to produce 0.8 young per pair from 2005 to 2006 while 0.89 and 0.64 fledged young per pair per year was the fledgling rate in central and western New South Wales, respectively. In a further study in New South Wales at Burrendong Dam, from 1993 to 2003, 15 pairs produced an average of one fledgling per territory but 1998 due to drought conditions, the rate was only 0.4 chick per territory. Within Kinchega National Park, however, the rate of 0.99 young per pair was fairly consistent regardless of climatic conditions. In the Australian Capital Territory, pairs were said to produce 1.1 fledglings per pair. In southeastern Australia, from 0.9 to 1.5 young per clutch are laid, with 0.6–1.0 young per pair per year. In Tasmania, from 0.64 to 0.8 young are fledged per clutch laid, 1.07 per successful nest. 0.91 young were produced per pair in southern South Australia or 1.1 fledglings per successful nesting attempt.

Subsequent research in South Australia found 38 successfully fledged young with 10 pairs or 26% producing two fledglings and that production was 1.1 per occupied territory and 1.3 per successful pair. 0.73 fledglings were produced pair per year in south-west Western Australia. Western Australian eagles produced 0.92 fledged young per clutch laid and 1.1 young per successful nest. During periods of drought in Western Australia, some wedge-tailed eagles may forgo breeding for up to four years. Higher annual rainfall in Western Australia, higher in mesic than arid areas, made a big difference in pair productivity, with 12% of arid zone pairs producing young, or 0.13 fledglings per pair, a very low productivity, while the mesic zone 69% of pairs produced fledglings, or 0.77 fledglings per pair. Generally, wedge-tailed eagles can nest in a variety of habitats and climatic conditions but tend to be slightly less productive in more arid environments. Significant broad-scale control is thought to be unlikely to be harming numbers of young being produced with those with a macropod-based diet perhaps having a richer diet. Like most eagles, wedge-tailed eagles fit the mould rather well of a K-selected breeder, i.e. being large, producing fewer young and tending to live relatively long.

== Conservation status ==
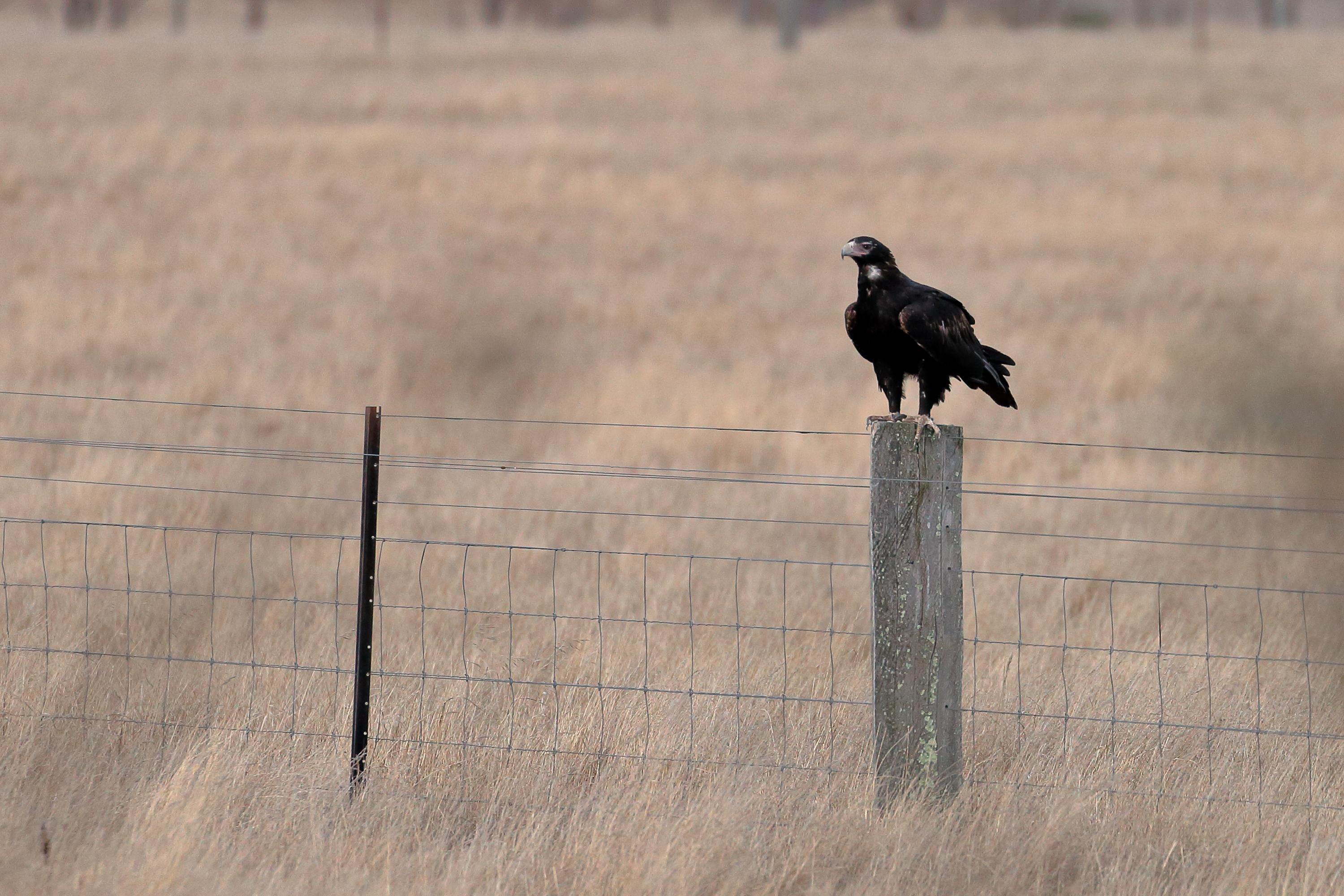
A wedge-tailed eagle at Lake Burrumbeet, Victoria

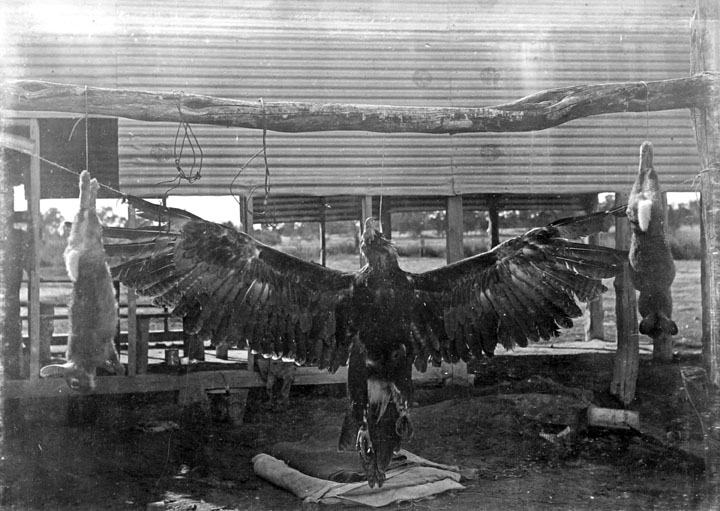
A wedge-tailed eagle killed during times of heavy persecution, Queensland, c. 1910

In the 1990s, it was estimated broadly that the global population was somewhere between 10,001 and 1,000,000 individuals. As of 2009, Birdlife International listed the total population as only 100,000 mature individuals, possibly conservative and from admittedly poor supporting data. As of that analysis, Birdlife considers the overall population of wedge-tailed eagles to be "possibly increasing". Generally, the wedge-tailed eagle appears to be quite stable in population. Although wedge-tailed eagles are often scarcer than those large distribution suggests, their total distribution covers more than 10.5 million square kilometres and the population is quite likely within hundreds of thousands. Thinning of forest cover, mostly inadvertent provisioning of carrion food sources and, particularly, rabbit introductions may have aided the species, and it may actually be commoner now than before European colonization. Though protected, sometimes wedge-tailed eagles are shot or trapped or killed by poison carcasses set out by farmers many of whom consider it a serious sheep killer. Historically, the wedge-tailed eagle was subject to persecution levels to rival any other eagle in the world. The heavy persecution began in the closing decades of the 19th century, due largely to the establishment of large-scale sheep farming in Australia. One Queensland station claimed to have poisoned 1060 eagles over 8 months in 1903.

Laws passed from 1909 to 1925 made it mandatory for landowners and farmers to kill eagles as vermin with enforcement determined by a given region's minister or vermin board, resulting in even more sweeping efforts to destroy the species. Steel-jawed rabbit traps were set around carcasses and Heligoland traps could sometimes trap several eagles at once, beyond sustained shooting and poisoning efforts. Between the years 1958 and 1967, 120,000 bounties were paid in merely the states of Queensland and Western Australia on wedge-tailed eagles killed, meaning an average 13,000 were killed each year. Even by 1967 to 1976, likely intentional human killings accounted for 54% of wedge-tailed eagle mortalities in Western Australia, with an estimated 30,000 killed in the year of 1969 throughout Australia. Strong legal protections started in Western Australia in the 1950s increasingly so to the 1970s or later elsewhere, now it is protected and subject to limited persecution throughout. Despite reduced persecution, as of the 1980s, 54% of recovered eagles by the 1980s were killed by human persecution. Despite such stunningly high rates of persecution, the wedge-tailed eagle was remarkably resilient to the haphazard persecution inflicted by humans in a way many other Australian wildlife, especially the regionally endemic mammals, and even other eagles elsewhere often are not.

Often the species is less intentionally harmed via human disturbance via land development particularly intensifying agricultural and modern settlements, which can in turn lead to clearing of mature trees, disturbances at the nest and decline of native prey species, all of which have a net negative effect on the wedge-tailed eagles. Eggshell thickness was not significantly decreased by the use of DDT likely due likely to the largely mammal-based diet of the species, whereas raptors which consume birds or fish are disproportionately affected by DDT. On occasion, the species is still subject to illegal shootings and poisonings, however persecution of the species is significantly less prevalent in recent decades. Occasionally but not commonly, they are killed by sodium fluoroacetate poisons long used to "control" Australian wildlife, but now generally directed at invasive species such as rabbits, feral pigs and foxes. A list of the main persistent threats in the 21st century to wedge-tailed eagles consists of: destruction of habitat, including logging, developments including urbanization, wind farm collisions and the disturbance and destruction associated with their construction, increasing density rural human populations, illegal persecution in sheep farm areas, drowning in open tanks in dry pastoral zones, roadkills (especially while foraging for roadkill carrion), collisions with fences, powerlines and airplanes, regular electrocutions, poisoning from rabbit baits and other baits and exposure to lead and other bullet fragments which may be responsible for some eagle debilitations and deaths. Within the Fleurieu Peninsula, some 1.74 eagles on average are claimed by wind farm turbine collisions.

Conservation needs may differ in different habitats, i.e. in more coastal temperate areas, the eagle is reported to have difficulty nesting when hillsides have been cleared of trees, meanwhile inland, they have lesser need of trees in elevated locations because they are more often assisted by thermals. However, they cannot generally persist where leafy trees are clearcut. Surprising resilience even to drought was found recently in the wedge-tailed eagles in the Australian Capital Territory where pair occupancy remained consistent through drought for wedge-tailed eagles but not for little eagles, but this may have more to do with the wedge-tails more successful uncoupling from a dependence on declining rabbits as prey than the little eagle. Of 84 eagle deaths or debilitating injuries, 52% were attributable to collisions or electrocutions, 15.5% due to persecution, 11% due to natural causes and 15% were due to unknown causes.

=== Status in Tasmania ===
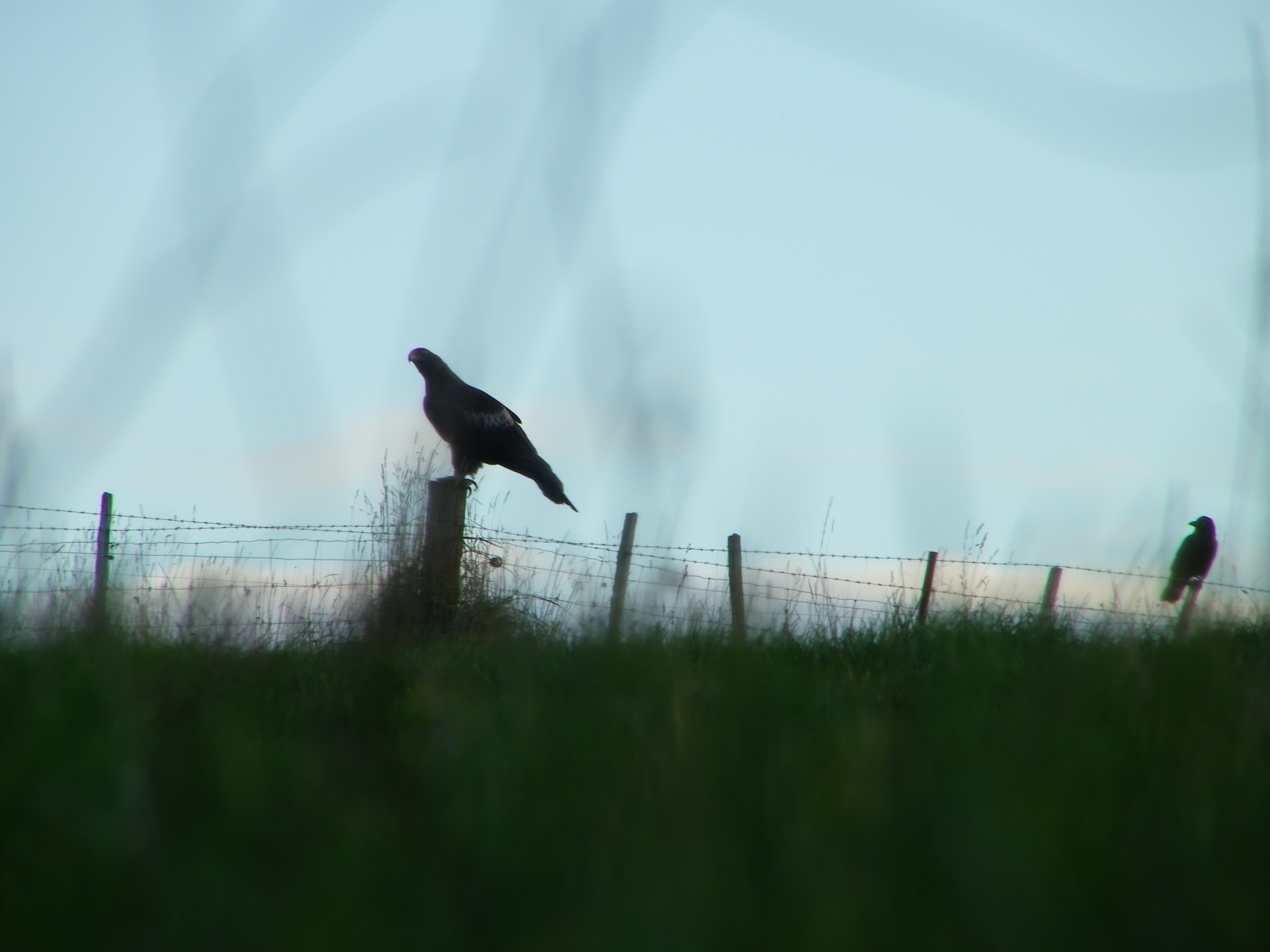
A threatened Tasmanian wedge-tailed eagle seen in silhouette alongside a forest raven

The Tasmanian race of wedge-tailed eagle, A. a. fleayi, is quite restricted in range and habitat, with estimated numbers having gone from 140 pairs in the 1980s down to only 60–80 by the mid-1990s. With the island's population numbering quite low and likely continuing its declining, as evidenced by slow replacement of lost pair members, the subspecies is listed as state-endangered. Furthermore, surveys contrasting 1977–1981 with 1998–2001 data found a decline of around 28% in the island's reported number of eagles. Generally Tasmanian wedge-tailed eagles are even less tolerant of human alterations and disturbances near the nest site than mainland wedge-tailed eagles and have more specific habitat requirements. Historically, the same hunting organization in Tasmania that played a large role in the extinction of the thylacine (Thylacinus cynocephalus) also intentionally tried to hunt the Tasmanian wedge-tailed eagle into extinction, publicly having erroneously claimed that eagles were non-native in Tasmania; however, hunting is unlikely to further continue on a large scale in the state. Where habitat clearance and degradation is extensive in Tasmania, the native prey populations are insufficient to support eagles. Furthermore, the clearing or logging of trees is especially critical in Tasmania, where the eagle is by and large a forest-dependent breeder.

Studies indicate that Tasmanian eagles mostly nest in emergent trees in old-growth native forest exposed to early morning sun and sheltered from prevailing strong winds and cold spring winds, given the more temperate climate there relative to most points in mainland Australia. The subspecies requires forest areas greater than 10 ha (25 acres) in which to breed and is very prone to desert its nest when disturbed. A predicted change was calculated to the carrying capacity of the Tasmanian forest given current operations is modeled, likely driving the population down. Wind farms in Tasmania are also an occasional threat; although not thought to be a significant source of mortality, wedge-tailed eagles, especially young ones, are less successful at avoiding invariably fatal collisions with them than Tasmanian white-bellied sea eagles. Furthermore, of 109 eagle carcasses recovered in Tasmania, all of them had trace levels of lead in their livers or femurs with at least part of the exposure likely from lead ammunition. In addition, like all eagles, Tasmanian wedge-tailed eagles are vulnerable to electrocutions, and collisions with vehicles, overhead wires, and fences and poisonings, largely via illegal killings by poachers of Tasmanian devils and forest ravens (Corvus tasmanicus). Efforts are underway to ameliorate the harm being done to Tasmanian wedge-tailed eagles, especially via forestry operations.

In protected areas, protocols are in place to protect Tasmanian eagle nests and protect them by creating an obligatory nest reserve of at least 10 ha and forestry operation have been restricted during the breeding season to outside a buffer zone of 500 m (1,600 ft), extending further to 1 km (0.62 mi) if the proposed work is in the line-of-sight of the nesting eagles. About 20% of known pairs are outside protected areas and on private land, so are largely outside the strict legal protection the subspecies has on governmental forest land. Furthermore, researchers are instituting rules to minimize disturbance, limiting breeding surveys to distant observations of whitewash and flattened treetops as proof of nesting and all detailed observations to be obtained after the cessation of breeding activities.

== Iconography ==
The bird is an emblem of the Northern Territory. The Parks and Wildlife Service of the Northern Territory uses the wedge-tailed eagle, superimposed over a map of the Northern Territory, as their emblem. The New South Wales Police Force emblem contains a wedge-tailed eagle in flight, as does the Northern Territory Correctional Services. La Trobe University in Melbourne also uses the wedge-tailed eagle in its corporate logo and coat of arms. The wedge-tailed eagle is also a symbol of the Australian Defence Force, featuring prominently on the ADF Flag, and the Royal Australian Air Force and Australian Air Force Cadets both use a wedge-tailed eagle on their badges. The Royal Australian Air Force has named its airborne early warning and control aircraft after the bird, the Boeing E-7 Wedgetail.

Early in 1967, the Australian Army 2nd Cavalry Regiment received its new badge, a wedge-tailed eagle swooping, carrying a lance-bearing the motto "Courage" in its talons. The regiment's mascot is a wedge-tailed eagle named "Courage". Since its formation, there have been two, Courage I and Courage II. In 1997, while on flight training with his handlers, Corporal Courage II refused to cooperate and flew away, not being found for two days following an extensive search. He was charged with being AWOL and reduced to the rank of trooper. He was promoted back to corporal in 1998.

The West Coast Eagles, an AFL football club from Western Australia, uses a stylised wedge-tailed eagle as their club emblem. In recent years, they have had a real-life wedge-tailed eagle named "Auzzie" perform tricks before matches.
