= Yookamurra Sanctuary =

Protected area in South Australia

- IUCN category IV (habitat/species management area)
- Location within South Australia
- Location: South Australia
- Coordinates: 34°30′33″S 139°26′00″E
- Area: 50.55 km^{2} (19.52 sq mi)
- Governing body: Australian Wildlife Conservancy
- Website: Official website

Yookamurra Sanctuary is a 50 km^{2} private protected area in the Murraylands region of South Australia, between the eastern slopes of the Mount Lofty Ranges and the Murray River, 24 km north-east of the town of Sedan. It is owned and managed by the Australian Wildlife Conservancy (AWC).

== History ==
Yookamurra is a consolidation of several properties acquired by Earth Sanctuaries for wildlife conservation from the late 1980s to 1998, before being purchased by AWC in 2002.

== Landscape and climate ==
The reserve consists of gently undulating country with shallow soils overlying calcrete, at an altitude of 80-90 m. It lies at the southern end of the semi-arid zone of South Australia and the climate is one of cool winters and hot summers. The average annual rainfall, mainly falling in winter, is 270 mm.

== Ecosystems ==
Most of Yookamurra's habitats are variations of mallee woodlands and shrublands.

== Fauna ==
Threatened fauna species include malleefowl, emu, southern hairy-nosed wombat, western grey kangaroo, red kangaroo, numbat, greater bilby, boodie, woylie and short-beaked echidna. An attempted reintroduction of the greater stick-nest rat failed.
