= Karakamia Sanctuary =

Nature reserve in south-west Western Australia

Coordinates: 31.823°S 116.243°E

Karakamia Sanctuary is a 2.75 km^{2} nature reserve in south-west Western Australia, 4 km from Chidlow and 50 km north-east of Perth. It is located within the jarrah forest of the Darling Scarp and is owned and managed by the Australian Wildlife Conservancy (AWC).

== History ==
Karakamia was originally purchased by Martin Copley in 1991 and established as a sanctuary in 1992, effectively the founding property of the AWC. Since the initial purchase it has increased in size through the acquisition of adjacent private land. Although much of the property was never cleared, some areas had been cleared or selectively logged and a replanting program is being implemented.

== Landscape and climate ==
Karakamia is on a lateritic plateau, with winter-flowing streams. The climate is Mediterranean with winter rainfall and dry summers. Average annual rainfall is 850 mm.

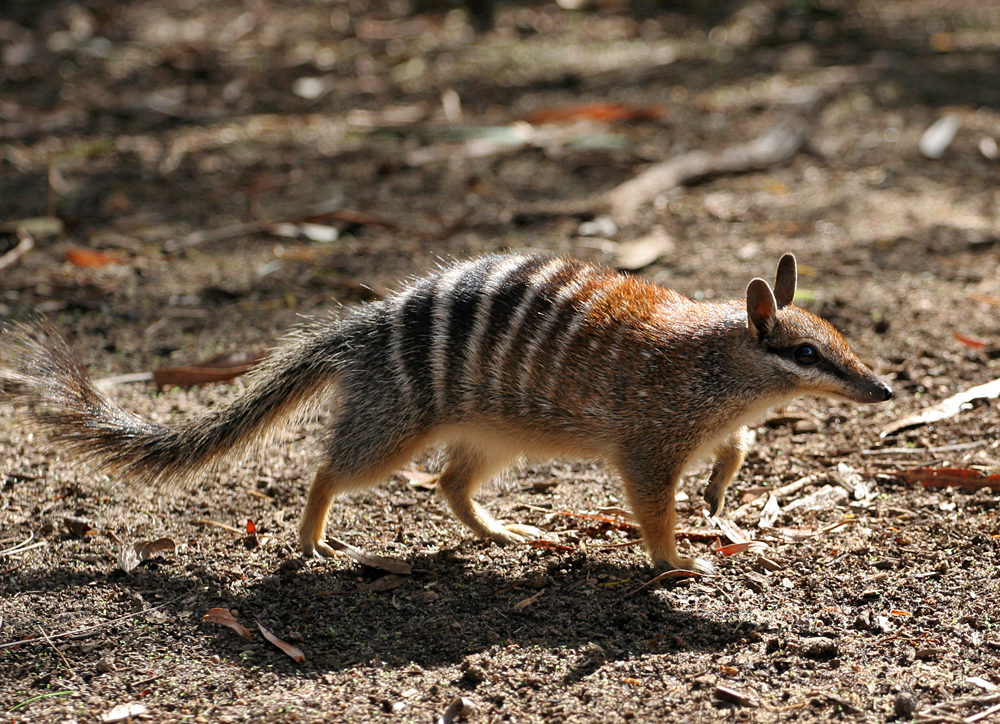
A numbat, one of the species found in Karakamia

== Fauna ==
Karakamia is managed to exclude exotic predators and herbivores, and a vermin-proof fence now surrounds the property. Various native mammals that would have occurred there in the past have been successfully reintroduced. These include the woylie, quenda, tammar wallaby, quokka, numbat and western ringtail possum. A significant bird present there is the forest subspecies of the red-tailed black-cockatoo.

== Ecosystems ==
Ecosystems include a variety of forest and woodland types: as well as jarrah forest, Karakamia contains marri, wandoo, and blackbutt woodland, as well as areas of heathland and shrubland, with a flooded gum and sedge community along the streams. More than 260 species of plants have been recorded.
