= Bowra =

Bowra may refer to:

People:

- Edward Charles Bowra (1841–1874), British sinologist
- Kenneth Bowra, American major-general and diplomat
- Maurice Bowra (1898–1971), English classical scholar, academic, and wit
- William Bowra (1752–1820), English cricketer

Places:

- Bowra Sanctuary, Queensland, Australia

== See also ==
- Bowral
