= Paruna =

Paruna may refer to:

- Paruna, South Australia
- Paruna Sanctuary, a nature reserve in south-west Western Australia.
