= Buckaringa Sanctuary =

Protected area in South Australia

- Location within South Australia
- Location: South Australia
- Nearest city: Quorn
- Coordinates: 32°3′18.86″S 138°4′11.31″E
- Area: 20 km^{2} (7.7 sq mi)
- Governing body: Australian Wildlife Conservancy
- Website: http://www.australianwildlife.org/sanctuaries/buckaringa-sanctuary.aspx

Buckaringa Sanctuary is a 20 km^{2} nature reserve in the southern Flinders Ranges of South Australia. It is 30 km north of the town of Quorn. It is owned and managed by the Australian Wildlife Conservancy (AWC).

== History ==
Buckaringa was a pastoral lease which was taken up in the 1880s, and used for sheep grazing and cereal cropping until 1990. It was acquired by Earth Sanctuaries as a wildlife reserve in the early 1990s, before being purchased by AWC in 2002.

== Landscape and climate ==
Folded sedimentary sequences of sandstone, siltstones and shales make up Buckaringa. Buckaringa and Middle Gorges were formed by streams cutting through the ridges on the ABC Range on right angles to the strata and have formed steep-sided gorges with many crevices, caves and fallen boulder piles. Other parts of the sanctuary consist of ridges and bedrock plains carrying shallow soils and rock debris, with deeper soils on the flatter alluvial zones away from the rock outcrops Most of Buckaringa consists of rocky ridges, plains with shallow soils and rock debris, and steep-sided gorges with caves, crevices and piles of boulders.

The climate is one of cool winters and hot summers in an arid region with an average annual rainfall of 329 mm.

== Ecosystems ==
Buckaringa’s habitats include hummock grassland, Acacia shrubland, low woodland dominated by northern cypress pine, mallee scrub, and strips of river red gum woodland along the creeks.

== Flora and fauna ==
Little is known of the flora and fauna of the sanctuary, though sixty bird and four mammal species have been recorded. Management includes ongoing surveys, along with a program to map the vegetation communities. Birds include wedge-tailed eagles, emus, sulphur-crested cockatoos, peregrine falcons, sacred kingfishers and blue-winged parrots. As well as mammals: yellow-footed rock-wallabies, western grey and red kangaroos, and euros.

=== Flora ===
According to the Australian Wildlife Conservancy there are eight vegetation communities at the Buckaringa Sanctuary.

=== Fauna ===
Australian Wildlife Conservancy state that there 60 known species of birds at Buckaringa Sanctuary and 4 known mammals. Some of the bird species are the wedge-tailed eagle (Aquila audax), the emu (Dromaius novaehollandiae), the sulphur-crested cockatoo (Cacatua galerita), the peregrine falcon (Falco peregrinus), the sacred kingfisher (Todiramphus sanctus) and the blue-winged parrot (Neophema chrysostoma).

The four mammal species are the western grey kangaroo (Macropus fuliginosus), the red kangaroo (Macropus rufus), the yellow-footed rock-wallaby (Petrogale xanthopus) and the euro (Macropus robustus erubescens).

Buckaringa holds one of the largest colonies of the threatened yellow-footed rock-wallaby. The protection of this species is the main management objective of the sanctuary and involves fox and goat eradication as well as the restoration of the natural flows of the water courses.

=== Threatened fauna ===
Scientific name: Petrogale xanthopus xanthopus and the common name: yellow-footed rock-wallaby. The yellow-footed rock-wallaby (Petrogale xanthopus xanthopus) is listed as vulnerable under the Environment Protection and Biodiversity Conservation Act 1999 and in South Australia under the National Parks and Wildlife Act 1972(Schedule 8) it is listed as vulnerable. The IUCN Red List of Threatened Species has the yellow-footed rock-wallaby (Petrogale xanthopus) listed as near threatened (likely to become endangered in the near future) (IUCN, 2013). The recognised subspecies Petrogale xanthopus xanthopus is yet to be assessed (IUCN, 2013). The yellow-footed rock-wallaby’s (Petrogale xanthopus xanthopus) head and body length ranges from 480 to 650 mm and the tail length from 570 to 700 mm (Sharman et al., 1995). The yellow-footed rock-wallaby is described as being fawn-grey above, white below, it has a distinct white cheek stripe, orange ears, a rich brown mid-dorsal strip from the crown of its head to the centre of its back; reddish-brown axillary patch with a buffy white side stripe and brown and white hip stripe, its forearms, hindlegs and feet are rich orange to a bright yellow with its tail orange-brown with irregular dark brown annulations and the tip of its tail dark brown or white (Sharman et al., 1995).

Scientific name: Neophema chrysostoma and the common name: blue-winged parrot. This parrot is listed as vulnerable in South Australia according National Parks and Wildlife Act 1972 (Schedule 8). According to Jim Flegg (2002) the blue-winged parrot (Neophema chrysostoma) is a medium-small grass-parrot, with the male being olive-green above, and on the throat and upper breast, with a small yellowish face path and a thin blue forehead line running to eyes and the rest of the breast, belly and undertail coverts being bright yellow. Flegg (2002) states that the wings are entirely deep royal blue and that a greenish-blue tail that is long, pointed with yellow outer feathers, and that the female is a duller and without the blue forehead. The blue-winged parrot has a varied habitat that includes woodland to open forest, to heath and scrub communities and grassy paddocks, gardens and farmland Flegg (2002). According to Flegg (2002) the blue-winged parrot is generally common in Tasmania and coastal areas but is usually scarce everywhere else.

Scientific name: Falco peregrinus and the common name: peregrine falcon. The peregrine falcon is listed as rare in South Australia according National Parks and Wildlife Act 1972 (Schedule 9). This generally widespread but uncommon falcon is a large (36–50 cm), strong bird that has a steel-grey back with a black hood, a white collar and brown-barred buff underparts Flegg (2002). The peregrine falcon’s tail and flight feathers are blackish, the bird’s legs are strong and yellow and it is known for its speed Flegg (2002). According to Flegg (2002) the peregrine falcon inhabits open landscapes, with gorges and cliffs that offer nesting ledges that are near water.

== Ecology ==
According to Hayward et al. (2011) that Buckaringa Sanctuary is situated in the western edge of the Flinders Lofty biogeographic zone in the central Flinders Ranges of South Australia. The vegetation of the sanctuary has been comprehensively altered due to more than 100 years of cultivation and grazing, however there are some small patches of relatively intact mallee and is dominated by Eucalyptus porosa and Eucalyptus viridis (Hayward et al., 2011). On the hill slopes there are Callitris glaucophylla and Casuarina pauper woodlands and in the riparian zones of the gorges there are Eucalyptus camaldulensis woodlands with areas of steep cliffs and rocky outcrops rising up to 100m above the riparian woodland (Hayward et al., 2011).

== Environmental threats ==
Kingsley et al. (2012) state that in Australia over the past 150 years a third of all modern mammal extinctions has occurred. According to Kingsley et al. (2012) the major causes of this decline has included habitat change from land degradation by livestock and the introduction of predators such as feral cats (Felis catus) and red foxes (Vulpes vulpes). Lethbridge and Alexander (2008) conclude that both predation from foxes and competition from introduced herbivores (such as goats and sheep) have led to the decline of the yellow-footed rock-wallaby (Petrogale xanthopus xanthopus) in Australia. The yellow-footed rock-wallaby and the goat (Capra hircus) compete for food due to their high-degree of dietary similarity and this competition for food may drive the yellow-footed rock-wallabies to have to search for food in poorer habitats over a greater area, most certainly exposing them to greater predation risks (Hayward et al., 2011). The introduction and the spread of the red fox (Vulpes vulpes), cat (Felis catus) and the European rabbit (Oryctolagus cuniculus) have seen severe biodiversity loss (Wallach et al., 2009). The two introduced predators, the fox and the cat have had a major impact on ground feeding and nesting birds (Ford et al., 2001). According to Ford et al. (2001) that there is increasing evidence that many bird species have experienced wide scale decline in areas that have been cleared for pastures and paddocks for livestock. Ford et al. (2001) states the main reasons for the decline of birds in agricultural regions appears to be habitat loss, fragmentation and degradation from human activity. Species such as raptors, particularly those that feed on native birds and mammals are predominantly at risk from habitat loss (Ford et al., 2001). Ford et al. (2001) state that grazing by livestock is believed to be a major threatening process for birds as it can lead to a loss of understorey, alteration of the grass and herb layer and the reduction of regeneration of trees. The problems incurred by small populations due to isolation are only amplified by fragmentation of habitat (Ford et al., 2001). Small local populations that isolated are at high risk of extinction. According to New (2006) that presumed closed-populations are among those that are frequently considered at risk.

== Management ==
Buckley et al. (2008) state that the most important tool in human efforts to conserve biological diversity at a global level is actively managed protected areas. The AWC team at Buckaringa is implementing a program to protect and maintain the yellow-footed rock-wallaby’s habitat. This includes the establishment of a feral animal control program that targets feral herbivores (goats and rabbits) and feral predators (cats and foxes) and by controlling erosion, restoring native vegetation and natural springs.

Some of the projects that the AWC have been conducting are removal of over 1000 goats, the modification of a 23 kilometre goat-resistant fence along the Buckaringa boundary line, and the removal of feral predators. Hayward et al. (2011) state that the Australian Wildlife Conservancy’s feral animal control program at the sanctuary has resulted in the eradication of thousands of foxes, rabbits and goats since taking over in 2002 through a variety of methods of eradication. According to Lethbridge and Alexander (2008) studies have shown positive population responses from the yellow-footed rock-wallabies (Petrogale xanthopus xanthopus) to fox (Vulpes vulpes) and goat (Capra hircus) control. This could also be due to the presence of the fox that populations of the yellow-footed rock-wallabies are now confined to refuge habitats where the predation risks are lower (Hayward et al., 2011). Robinson et al. (1994) stated that between January 1979 and January 1984 the estimated known-to-be-alive population of Petrogale xanthopus in Middle Gorge ranged from 11 to 20 animals. Since the 1980s long-term population estimates for the entire Buckaringa Sanctuary show a highly fluctuating, but persisting population of Petrogale xanthopus of between 300 and 1600 (Hayward et al., 2011)(Hayward et al., 2011). As protection of the yellow-footed rock-wallaby is the main objective of the sanctuary, all the project works appear to be creating a more favourable environment for their survival.
