= Scotia Sanctuary =

Protected area in New South Wales, Australia

- Location within New South Wales
- Location: New South Wales
- Coordinates: 33.29°S 141.079°E
- Area: 650 km^{2} (250 sq mi)
- Established: 1994
- Governing body: Australian Wildlife Conservancy
- Website: Official website

Scotia Sanctuary is a 650 km^{2} (250 mi^{2}) nature reserve in the south-western plains of New South Wales, Australia, adjacent to the border with South Australia. It is located in the Murray Mallee subregion of the Murray-Darling Depression Bioregion, 150 km (93 mi) south of the city of Broken Hill. It is owned and managed by the Australian Wildlife Conservancy (AWC).

== History ==
Scotia comprises two former grazing properties, Tararra and Ennisvale, which were purchased by Earth Sanctuaries Limited in 1994, and eventually acquired by AWC in 2002.

== Landscape and climate ==
Scotia is characterised by a low-relief landscape of plains with parallel sand dunes and open calcareous swales. Surface water is limited by the sandy soils and there are no watercourses. The climate is one of cool winters and hot summers in an arid region, with irregular rainfall averaging an annual 250 mm (9.8 in).

== Ecosystems ==
Scotia's habitats include various Eucalyptus open shrubland (mallee) communities and sheoak woodlands, .

== Fauna ==
The Scotia Endangered Mammal Recovery Project is a program of reintroduction of mammals that have become extinct regionally, in order to establish viable, self-sustaining populations. Species successfully reintroduced so far include: numbat, greater bilby, burrowing bettong, brush-tailed bettong and bridled nailtail wallaby, while an attempted reintroduction of the greater stick-nest rat failed. Threatened bird species present on Scotia include malleefowl, regent and scarlet-chested parrots, striated grasswren and black-eared miner. The reserve forms part of the 12,200 km^{2} Riverland Mallee Important Bird Area, identified as such by BirdLife International for its importance in the conservation of mallee birds and their habitats.
