= Dakalanta Sanctuary =

Protected area in South Australia

- Location within South Australia
- Location: South Australia
- Nearest city: Lock, South Australia
- Coordinates: 33°24′54″S 135°19′23″E
- Area: 130 km^{2} (50 sq mi)
- Established: 2002
- Governing body: Australian Wildlife Conservancy
- Website: http://www.australianwildlife.org/AWC-Sanctuaries/Dakalanta-Sanctuary.aspx

Dakalanta Sanctuary is a 130-square-kilometre (50 mi^{2}) nature reserve in the northern region of the Eyre Peninsula of South Australia, between the towns of Lock and Elliston. It is owned and managed by the Australian Wildlife Conservancy (AWC).

== History ==
Dakalanta was a pastoral lease which was acquired by Earth Sanctuaries as a wildlife reserve in the 1990s, before being purchased by AWC in 2002. A quarter of the property was previously cleared and is regenerating.

== Landscape ==
Most of Dakalanta consists of low hills and stabilised dunes.

== Ecosystems ==
Dakalanta's habitats include mallee, sheoak and native pine communities.

== Fauna ==
Dakalanta's fauna includes the malleefowl and the southern hairy-nosed wombat.
