= Marion Downs =

Marion Downs may refer to:

- Marion Downs (audiologist) (1914–2014), audiologist and professor at the University of Colorado Health Sciences Center, Denver
- Marion Downs Sanctuary, a nature reserve in the Kimberley region of north-west Western Australia
- Marion Downs Station, a cattle station in the Channel Country of Queensland
