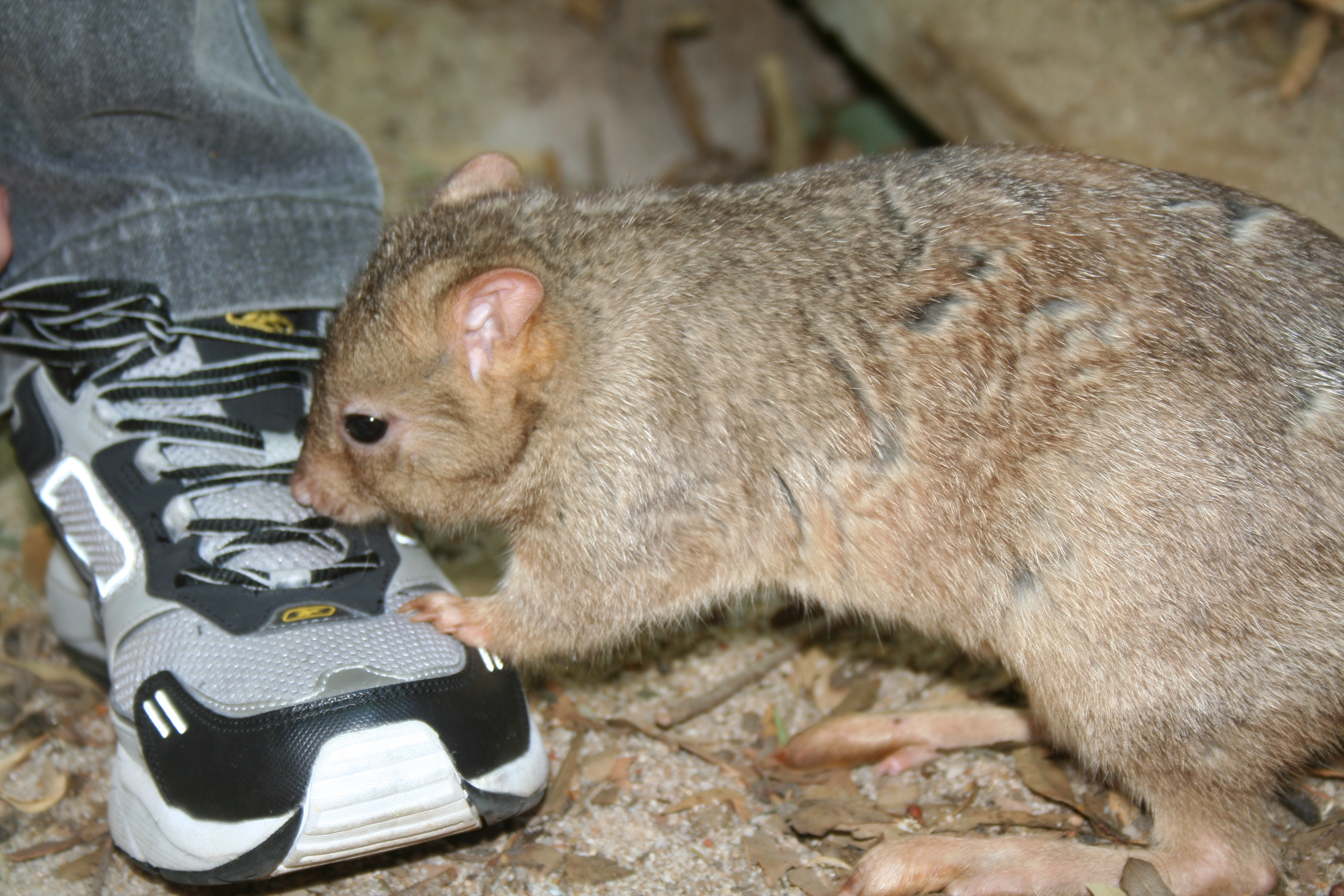

Conservation status
- Near Threatened (IUCN 3.1)
- CITES Appendix I

Scientific classification
- Kingdom: Animalia
- Phylum: Chordata
- Class: Mammalia
- Infraclass: Marsupialia
- Order: Diprotodontia
- Family: Potoroidae
- Genus: Bettongia
- Species: B. lesueur

Binomial name
- Bettongia lesueur (Quoy & Gaimard, 1824)

Subspecies
- †B. lesueur graii; B. lesueur lesueur; B. lesueur nova
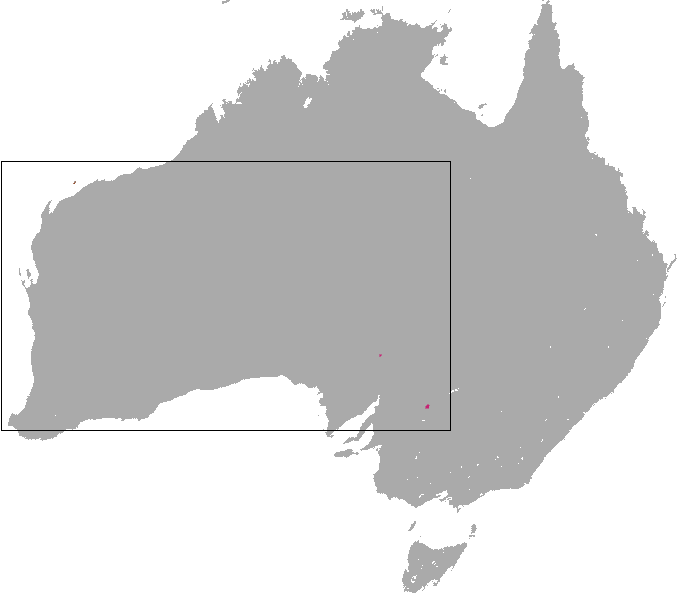
- Boodie range (brown — native, pink — reintroduced)

= Boodie =

Species of marsupial

The boodie (Bettongia lesueur), also known as the burrowing bettong or Lesueur's rat-kangaroo, is a small, furry, rat-like mammal native to Australia. Once common throughout the continent, it is now restricted to a few coastal islands. A member of the rat-kangaroo family (Potoroidae), it lives in burrows and is active at night when it forages for fungi, roots, and other plant matter. It is about the size of a rabbit and, like most marsupials, carries its young in a pouch.

Before European settlement, it was the most common macropod in Australia (a group that includes kangaroos, wallabies, and other Australian mammals). Competition and predation by introduced rabbits, cats, and foxes, as well as habitat loss, pressured the population. It was declared a pest in the 1900s and was wiped out by the 1960s; however, the loss of the boodie and other ground-foraging animals has degraded soil quality. Populations persisted on three west coast islands (Bernier, Dorre, and Barrow), and the boodie has been reintroduced to the mainland since the 2000s.

== Taxonomy and name ==
The boodie belongs to the family Potoroidae, which includes the rat-kangaroos, potoroos, and other bettongs. It is one of four species in the genus Bettongia. There are three subspecies of Bettongia lesueur: B. l. graii, the extinct mainland subspecies; B. l. nova, an undescribed subspecies on Barrow and Brodie Island; and B. l. lesueur.

The word "boodie" comes from its name boodi or burdi in Noongar, an Aboriginal language spoken in southwestern Australia. The animal was first collected on an 1817 French expedition of the west coast, and was named Bettongia lesueur after Charles Lesueur, an artist and naturalist who accompanied a previous French expedition.

== Paleontology ==
In the late Oligocene, fossils of paleopotoroines and potoroines (potoroid ancestors) appeared. During the Oligocene, ice buildup on Antarctica resulted in less rainfall on Australia. Rainforests declined, replaced by more arid-tolerant leathery leaf woodlands and reed swamps. This climate shift may have favored a radiation of terrestrial marsupials, including potoroid ancestors. Fossils of the family Potoroidae appear from the mid-Miocene to Recent sediments. Subfossil records of the burrowing bettong have been found in West Victoria, western New South Wales, and South Australia.

== Morphology ==
The boodie is a small, rat-like marsupial with short, rounded ears and a lightly haired, thick tail. This animal has a pointed rostrum and beady black eyes, hind limbs longer than the forelimbs, and large hind feet. This bettong is yellow-gray above and light gray below. Its short, dense fur feels soft and woolly. The animal bears a faint hip stripe and a distinctive white tail tip. This tail is weakly prehensile and used to carry nest material. About the size of a wild rabbit, this little marsupial weighs an average of 1.5 kg (3.3 lb). Head and body length is an average of 40 cm (16 in). Little to no sexual dimorphism seems to exist. However, morphology varies among subspecies and between islands.

In general, a potoroid skull can be separated from a macropodid skull by the presence of well-developed upper canines and large plagiaulacoid (bladelike) premolars. Also unlike macropodids, the squamosal bone widely contacts the frontal. B. lesueur skulls are short and broad with large palatal vacuities, inflated auditory bullae, and short, broad nasals. The mandible is relatively short and deep compared to other relatives. The dental formula for all the modern potoroines is I 3/1 C 1/0 PM 1/1 M 4/4. Molars are bunodont and quadrate, and the premolars have 9–11 fine, vertical ridges. Young bettongs have two molars which are replaced by one adult premolar; this event is a good indication of maturity. The postcranial skeleton of all potoroids has seven cervical, 13 thoracic, six lumbar, two sacral, and 22 caudal vertebrae, with 13 pairs of ribs.

== Reproduction ==
If conditions are good, the boodie seems to mate throughout the year, probably using a polygynous mating system. Males do not seem to have dominance hierarchies; rather, they defend females against other males. Some females seem to establish associations with other females; whether these contribute to increased reproductive success is unknown. Gestation lasts 21 days, with only one young per litter. Like other marsupial newborns, the newborn is altricial. About four months elapse until weaning. After young leave the pouch, they take six to seven months to mature sexually. Females mate the day after giving birth, and the fertilized egg arrests development until the young is weaned. This is an example of facultative embryonic diapause. In captivity, females are able to bear three young per year.

== Ecology ==
The boodie once lived in a range of dry subtropical and tropical habitats, from open eucalyptus and acacia woodlands to arid spinifex grasslands. In its current range on the islands, it seems to prefer open Triodia (spinifex) and dune habitats, but will burrow anywhere except places with rocky substrate. The burrowing bettong eats a variety of foods, such as seeds, fruits, flowers, tubers, roots, succulent leaves, grasses, fungi, termites, and marine refuse. It will also raid vegetable gardens. Current populations fluctuate, building up during the years with average or good rainfall and crashing during drought years. These marsupials are known to live at least three years in the wild.

After colonisation of Australia, its predators were mainly the introduced red fox and cats. Some natural predators on the islands include the wedge-tailed eagle and sea eagles; on Barrow Island, monitor lizards appear to be a significant predator.

At the Arid Recovery Reserve near Roxby Downs in South Australia, the boodie is preyed upon by the western quoll.

Before its extinction on the mainland, the boodie served a very important function in the Australian grassland ecosystem. As it foraged, it mixed organic matter into the soil, spreading fungi and seeds. This mixing also increased water absorption into the soil and reduced the combustible material under trees, decreasing the likelihood of fire. These actions helped maintain the balance of trees, shrubs, and grasses. The loss of small, ground-foraging animals after European settlement contributed to widespread soil deterioration. Also, B. lesueur may have helped to thin woody weeds on rangeland by browsing shrubs growing after fires.

The contraction of the distribution range in Southwest Australia during English settlement has been difficult to determine, Guy C. Shortridge searched unsuccessfully for the species south of Perth in 1909, and Charles M. Hoy obtained a skull that might have been collected at the sub-fossil site at the Margaret River Caves systems located within the Leeuwin-Naturaliste National Park.

== Behavior and physiological attributes ==
B. lesueur is very vocal, communicating through grunts, hisses, and squeals. It shelters in burrows, the only macropodiform to do so. Burrows vary from simple tunnels to complex networks with multiple entrances and deep, interconnecting tunnels. These elaborate burrows, or warrens, have been seen having from four to 94 entrances. Warrens are communal, housing an average of 20–40 bettongs. Bettongs appear to switch warrens from time to time, though each has one or two preferred warrens. During the day in the warrens, they form groups of one male and one or many females; males never share warrens with other males. Some of the female-female groups seem to be mother–daughter associations. However, individuals seem to forage alone, showing none of the day-range group associations.

The boodie is nocturnal, sheltering during the day in burrows and foraging widely at night for food. Locomotion is mainly with the hind legs. The forelimbs are used for support when the boodie is stationary. This bettong exhibits a slow gait and fast gait. The fast gait (or bipedal hop) is characteristic of the macropodiforms and uses only the hind limbs, with the forelimbs held close to the body and tail acting as a counterbalance. The slow gait (or quadrupedal crawl) is used during foraging and other unstressed times. Nighttime movement is usually fairly limited, averaging less than 200 m (660 ft). However, researchers have measured this marsupial traveling 2.2 km (1.4 mi) searching for food. One individual tracked on Barrow Island traveled 5 km (3.1 mi). B. lesueur uses scent to locate food, which it digs up with the claws on its strong forelimbs. The boodie will even climb into low shrubs to find food. Demonstrating little interspecific interactions, bettongs are apparently undisturbed by run-ins with other non-predators.

Bettong digestive systems are characterized by a very large sacciform fore stomach, a tubiform fore stomach with limited sacculation, and a small hind stomach. The hind gut has a well-developed, simple cecum. Like many macropodiforms, bettongs have fore gut fermentation. Daily water intake is only about 3% of its body weight. B. lesueur seems to have renal adaptations to conserve water, which is important in its arid and semiarid habitats.

== Species decline ==
Researchers have proposed many possible causes for the boodie's decline on mainland Australia, which began once Australia was colonized. Nineteenth-century colonists killed boodies, considering them a destructive garden pest. As pastoral leases spread over the grasslands, livestock grazing reduced vegetation cover, shrinking their habitat. Also, introduced species such as foxes, cats, and rabbits took a severe toll on the boodie, especially on islands. Rabbits competed with them for food and shelter, and the foxes and cats became their major predators. The theory that rabbits compete with boodies for food has been disputed in a study done in 2002 although further investigation is needed. Finally, the Indigenous Australians maintained certain fire regimes, and when these ceased, the habitat probably changed. The species was amongst several marsupials declared pests under the Western Australian Vermin Act 1918, by a regional animal control board at Denmark, Western Australia in 1922. By the 1960s, all the boodies on the mainland were extinct.

== Conservation efforts ==
Once present in all mainland states except Victoria, the burrowing bettong survived as three remnant populations on small offshore islands. These islands include Bernier and Dorre Islands in Shark Bay and Barrow Island off the northwest coast of Western Australia. The marsupial was listed on the 2006 IUCN Red List as Vulnerable due to acute restriction of its area of occupancy to less than 100 km^{2}. In 2008, however, due to successful conservation efforts both by government agencies and the private sector, the species was listing was downgraded to Near Threatened, as its range and population had increased, and are still increasing. Newly established populations included Herrison Prong on mainland Shark Bay by the DEC, as well as Faure Island, Scotia Sanctuary, and Yookamurra Sanctuary, which were established by the Australian Wildlife Conservancy. The species was released at a large fenced sanctuary at Newhaven in the Northern Territory in June 2022, and at Mallee Cliffs National Park in September 2023. It is pegged for reintroduction to Dirk Hartog Island following the removal of feral cats and domestic livestock, as well as to a fenced landscape at Sturt National Park, in New South Wales.
