= Marion Downs Sanctuary =

Nature reserve in the Kimberley region of Western Australia

Coordinates: 17°S 127.5°E

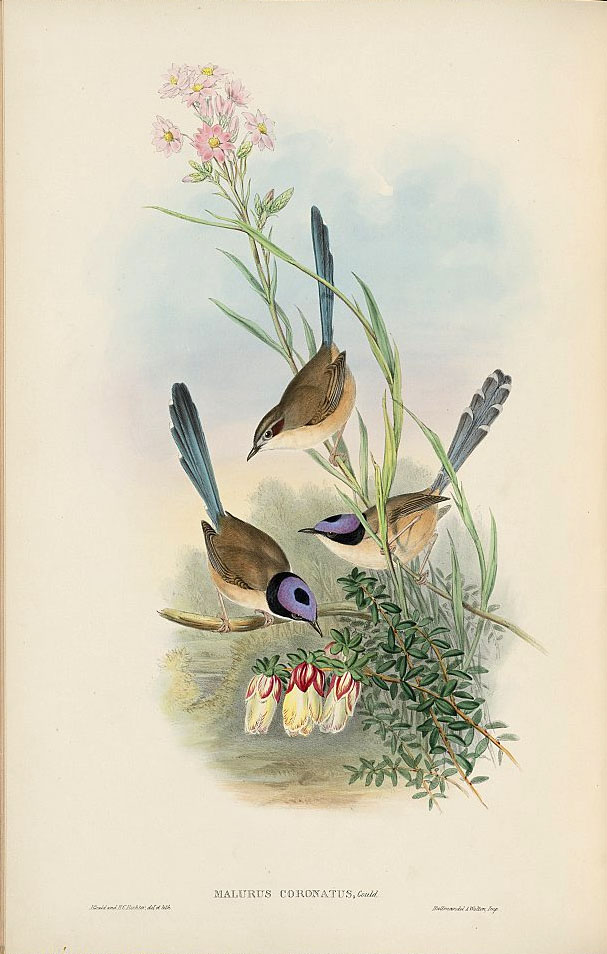
The sanctuary is home to a population of purple-crowned fairywrens

Marion Downs Sanctuary, a former cattle station, is a 2,890 square kilometres (1,116 sq mi) nature reserve in the Kimberley region of north-west Western Australia.

The once privately owned cattle station that occupied an area of 2,500 square kilometres (965 sq mi) had to sell following years of financial hardship and a change in local government boundaries that increased the rates by 800%. Phil Stoker, Gerald Adamson and Joe Batiste sold the property for just over A$4 million after owning it for 22 years.

It is currently owned and managed by the Australian Wildlife Conservancy (AWC), by which it was purchased in 2008 with funds from private donors and a A$1.8 million grant from the Australian Government. It lies in the Central Kimberley Bioregion and adjoins Mornington Sanctuary, already owned by the AWC. The two sanctuaries combined will form a 6,400 square kilometres (2,471 sq mi) protected area extending over 100 kilometres (62 mi) from north to south, and will be one of the world's largest privately owned reserves.

== Landscape and climate ==
The landscape of the reserve is similar to that of Mornington, a mix of tropical savanna woodlands and grasslands, with rugged sandstone escarpments and deep river gorges in the catchment of the Fitzroy River. The climate is tropical and monsoonal with distinct wet (November–April) and dry (May–October) seasons.

== Wildlife ==
Threatened bird species recorded from Mornington including the Gouldian finch, purple-crowned fairywren and Australian bustard. Threatened mammals include the northern quoll, rock ringtail possum and antilopine wallaroo. The freshwater crocodile is present.
