= Australian Wildlife Conservancy =

Australian not-for-profit organisation

- Formation: 1991; 35 years ago
- Founder: Martin Copley
- Type: Nonprofit organisation
- Location: Australia
- Website: www.australianwildlife.org

The Australian Wildlife Conservancy (AWC) is an independent Australian nonprofit organisation that works to conserve threatened wildlife and ecosystems in Australia. AWC is the largest private owner and manager of land for conservation in Australia, currently managing 31 sanctuaries and partnership sites for wildlife conservation that cover over 6.5 million hectares across Australia. It partners with governmental agencies, Indigenous groups, and private landholders to manage landscapes for effective conservation. Most funding comes from private support in the form of tax-deductible donations from the public, as well as some government grants for particular purposes, such as from the Australian government's National Reserve System Program.

AWC has undertaken conservation projects targeting threatened species such as northern quoll. AWC partnered with Territory Natural Resource Management (TRM), James Cook University, Gulf Savannah NRM, and Western Yalanji to trial conservation methods, including artificial dens for quolls, genetic research, and controlled burn programs.

== History ==
Australian Wildlife Conservancy was founded in response to Australia's mammal extinction crisis. Over a third of the world's mammal extinctions in the last 400 years have occurred in Australia, and Australia has already lost 31 species of mammal. Many of these extinctions could have been prevented with effective conservation measures in place. Australian Wildlife Conservancy operates under a unique model for conservation, using science (predominantly biodiversity survey work and targeted research) to inform on-the-ground land management, such as control of fire, feral animals, and weeds. There is a strong focus on wildlife conservation: consequently, about 80% of all staff are based in the field and, as of 2021, 83.5% of AWC's total expenditure is invested in conservation programs.

The organization originated with a 1991 land purchase (of what is now Karakamia Sanctuary) by AWC's founder, Martin Copley. He established the sanctuary, constructed a feral-proof fence, cleared the area of feral animals and started reintroducing threatened mammals into this area. Karakamia is still open for public spotlight tours, where visitors can observe small mammals such as the critically endangered woylie or brush-tailed bettong (Bettongia penicillata), tammar wallaby (Macropus eugenii), quenda, and common brushtail possum. In 2001, AWC became a public charitable organization.

In 2002, the AWC agreed to acquire four sanctuaries, Buckaringa, Dakalanta, Scotia and Yookamurra, for A$5.2 million from Earth Sanctuaries Ltd (ESL), the company founded by John Wamsley.

In June 2007, AWC announced the establishment of a corporate partnership with Optus.

The 2016 State of the Environment report suggested that, while Australia is highly biodiverse, it continues to suffer unprecedented decline, despite legislation at all state and federal levels. In response, AWC protects a diverse array of habitats across a large network of sanctuaries, representing 88% of Australia's bird species, 74% of mammals, 54% of reptiles, and 56% of amphibian species.

In 2019, AWC partnered with Bullo River Station, which covers over 160,000 hectares in the north-west corner of the Northern Territory, near the mouth of the Victoria River. This is a unique partnership between a working pastoral property and a conservation sanctuary to generate outcomes for both wildlife and cattle. The landscape here is typical of the Eastern Kimberley, dominated by Keep River sandstone formations with rocky gorges, lush riverside vegetation and expansive tropical savannah woodland. Inventory biodiversity surveys have already identified several important species of rare and threatened wildlife, including the Gouldian finch (Erythrura gouldiae) and wyulda or scaly-tailed possum (Wyulda squamicaudata).

In 2021, the AWC launched the Western River Refuge initiative, a project delivered in partnership with Kangaroo Island Land for Wildlife and private landholders in response to the destructive bushfires that occurred on Kangaroo Island in 2020. The Western River Refuge includes a 369-hectare feral predator-free fenced safe haven to protect the Kangaroo Island dunnart, as well as several other threatened species.

== Conservation programs and strategy ==
Australian Wildlife Conservancy operates a network of large-scale conservation areas across Australia, including feral predator-free fenced sanctuaries designed to protect highly vulnerable species from invasive predators such as cats and foxes. These sanctuaries support the recovery and reintroduction of threatened mammals and birds in environments where key threats have been removed.

In addition to protected areas, AWC conducts biodiversity monitoring and targeted species recovery programs, alongside land management practices such as fire management, feral animal control, and habitat restoration.

== AWC sanctuaries ==
As of 2024 AWC sanctuaries exist at the following locations, among others:

- Bowra, Queensland
- Brooklyn, Queensland
- Buckaringa, South Australia
- Bullo River Station, Northern Territory
- Charnley River–Artesian Range Wildlife Sanctuary, Western Australia
- Curramore, Queensland
- Dakalanta, South Australia
- Dambimangari Country, Western Australia
- Faure Island, Western Australia
- Kalamurina, South Australia
- Karakamia, Western Australia
- Mallee Cliffs National Park, New South Wales
- Marion Downs, Western Australia
- Mornington, Western Australia
- Mount Gibson, Western Australia
- Mount Zero-Taravale, Queensland
- Newhaven, Northern Territory
- Paruna, Western Australia
- Piccaninny Plains, Queensland
- Pungalina-Seven Emu, Northern Territory
- Richard Underwood Nature Refuge (RUNR), near St George, Queensland
- Scotia, New South Wales
- Tableland, Western Australia
- The Pilliga, New South Wales
- The Western River Refuge, Kangaroo Island, South Australia
- Wilinggin, Western Australia
- Wongalara, Northern Territory
- Yampi Sound Training Area, Western Australia
- Yookamurra, South Australia
