= Brooklyn Sanctuary =

Nature reserve in Queensland, Australia

- IUCN category II (national park)
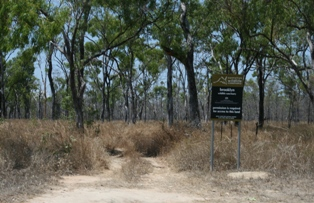
- Brooklyn Sanctuary near Mt Carbine

- Location within Queensland
- Location: Queensland
- Coordinates: 16°35′42″S 145°00′10″E
- Governing body: Australian Wildlife Conservancy

Brooklyn Sanctuary is a 600 km^{2} (232 sq mi) nature reserve in north-east Queensland, Australia, less than 100 km (62 mi) north-west of Cairns. It is owned and managed by the Australian Wildlife Conservancy by which it was acquired in 2004. It is located on the boundary of the Wet Tropics bioregion and Einasleigh Uplands bioregion on the Mount Carbine Tableland. The landscape varies widely from rugged, rainforested peaks of up to 1,200 m altitude, with an annual rainfall of 4,000 mm, to drier lowland plains in the upper reaches of the Mitchell River with less than 900 mm. It is important for the conservation of upland endemic species. Part of the property is inscribed on the World Heritage List.

== Fauna ==
Threatened birds found on Brooklyn include the southern cassowary, buff-breasted button-quail and red goshawk. Notable mammals include northern bettong, yellow-bellied glider, spotted-tailed quoll and spectacled flying-fox.

== Ecosystems ==
Ecosystems include a variety of rainforest types, wet sclerophyll forests, mixed eucalypt woodlands, melaleuca gallery forest, and lakes on alluvial plains. Brooklyn also contains a relict population of bunya pine.
