= Paruna Wildlife Sanctuary =

Protected area in Western Australia

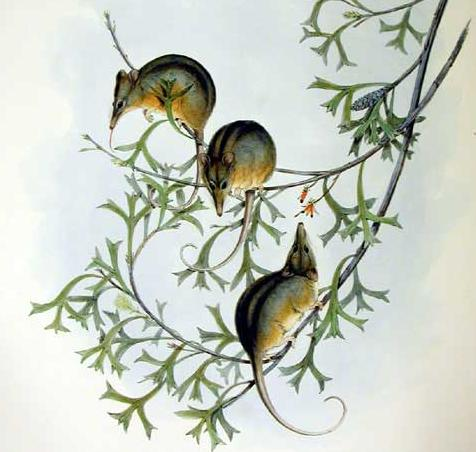
- Noolbengers, or Honey Possums, live in the reserve

- Location within Western Australia
- Location: Western Australia
- Nearest city: Midland
- Coordinates: 31.676°S 116.152°E
- Area: 20 km^{2} (7.7 sq mi)
- Established: 1998
- Governing body: Australian Wildlife Conservancy
- Website: Official website

Paruna Wildlife Sanctuary is a 20-square-kilometre (7.7 mi^{2}) nature reserve in the Avon Valley, 50 kilometres (31 mi) north-east of Perth in south-west Western Australia. It is in the Avon-Wheatbelt Bioregion and is owned and managed by the Australian Wildlife Conservancy (AWC).

== History ==
Paruna Wildlife Sanctuary consists of several properties consolidated to form a 14 kilometres (8.7 mi) corridor between the Walyunga and Avon Valley National Parks. Negotiations during the 1990s culminated in its formal opening in 1998. Since then areas previously cleared have been subject to a rehabilitation program, and walking tracks constructed for public use.

== Landscape and climate ==
Paruna is in the Darling Range, a landscape of hills along a rocky escarpment, with river valleys. The climate is Mediterranean with winter rainfall and dry summers. Average annual rainfall is 700 millimetres (28 in).

== Ecosystems ==
Most of the reserve is dominated by wandoo and powderbark woodlands, with extensive areas of heathland and some patches of jarrah and marri forest. Flooded gum and paperbark occur along the Avon River.

== Fauna ==
Significant mammal species present are chuditch and honey possum, while an important bird is Carnaby's black-cockatoo. In collaboration with CALM, and with an ongoing program to control exotic predators such as foxes, various native mammals that would have occurred on Paruna in the past are being successfully reintroduced. These include the woylie, quenda, black-flanked rock-wallaby and the tammar wallaby.
