= Warrawong Wildlife Sanctuary =

Zoo in Australia

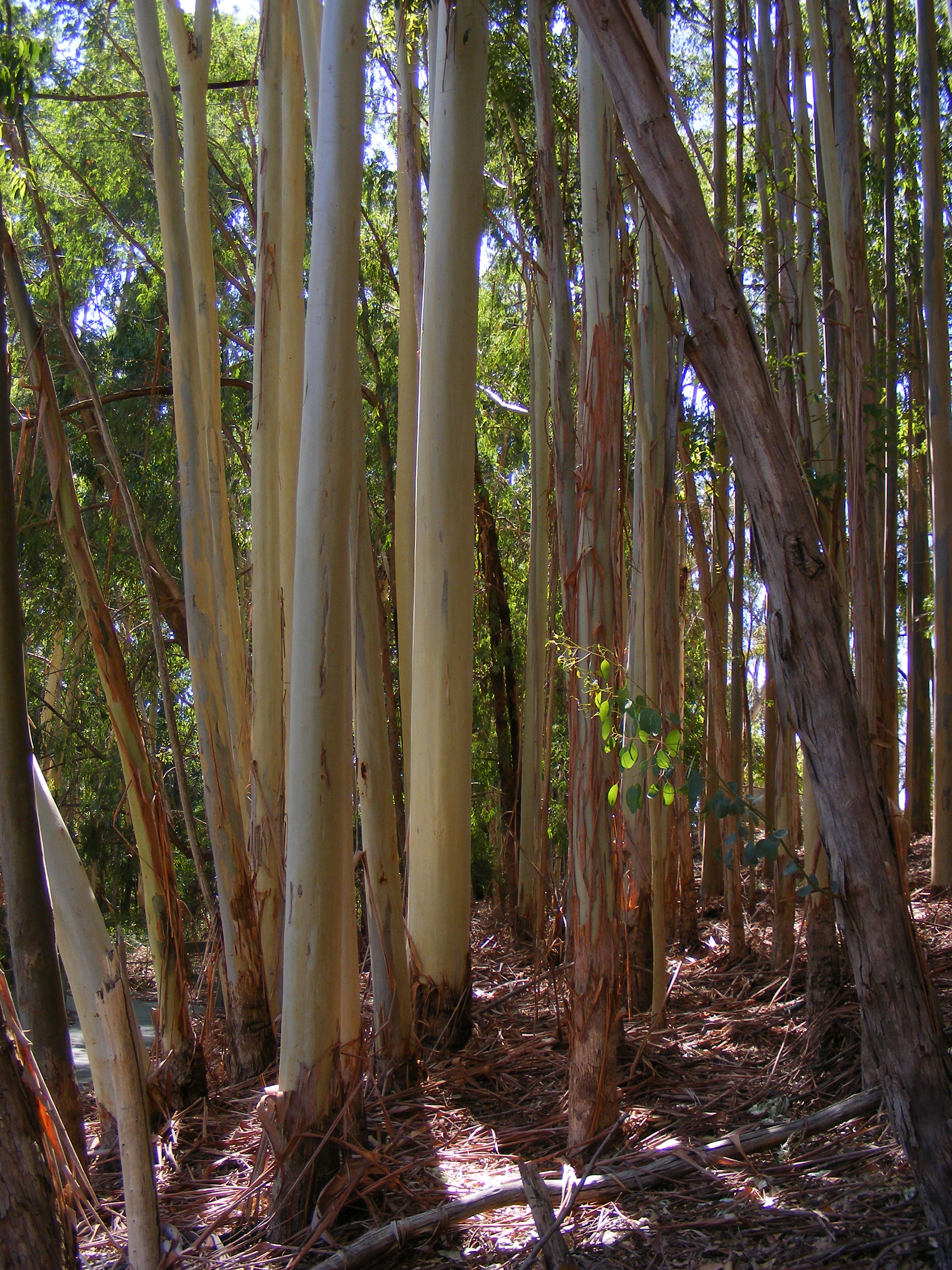
- Forest habitat in Warrawong Sanctuary
- Interactive map of Warrawong Wildlife Sanctuary
- 35°02′15″S 138°44′06″E
- Location: Mylor, South Australia, Australia
- Land area: 35 hectares (86 acres)
- Website: www.warrawongws.com.au

Warrawong Wildlife Sanctuary, formerly Warrawong Sanctuary, is a wildlife reserve in the Australian state of South Australia located in the suburb of Mylor about 17 kilometres (11 mi) south-east of the centre of the state capital of Adelaide.

== History ==
The land was established as Warrawong Sanctuary by John Wamsley to conserve endangered Australian wildlife. He purchased the first 35 acres (14 ha), a degraded dairy farm, in 1969, with 50 acres (20 ha) later added.

Wamsley eradicated all feral plants and animals (including foxes, which are predators of platypus) from the sanctuary and erected a surrounding fence to preserve the sanctuary's feral-free state, completed in 1982. Warrawong was opened to the general public in 1985 with the goal of generating enough money to set up more sanctuaries. A company, Earth Sanctuaries Limited, was started in 1988 with a forty-year strategy to create a network of eighty sanctuaries, spanning all of Australia's habitats. The company was listed on the Australian Stock Exchange on 8 April 2000. The float was under-subscribed leaving the company A$10 million short of funds and unable to complete its network of sanctuaries in the eastern states of Australia. In 2003, part of the site was subdivided by property developers During the mid-2000s, Earth Sanctuaries Limited was delisted from the Australian stock exchange.

Due to the company's poor commercial performance, Warrawong was closed for five months of 2005. In 2006 the sanctuary was bought by Anthony Miller, owner of the Gumeracha Toy Factory and Big Rocking Horse, with a commitment to continue operations.

In May 2010 Warrawong was bought by Zoos South Australia and the Ngarrindjeri People. However, in February 2013 Zoos South Australia announced that they had withdrawn their support for the Sanctuary due to it being an unsustainable return on their investment.

In 2017, the abandoned Sanctuary was purchased by Narelle MacPherson and David Cobbold, a couple from Peel Zoo in Pinjarra, Western Australia.

In 2017, there were unconfirmed sightings of platypus in the Sturt Gorge Recreation Park, on the Sturt River, and another further east at Coromandel Valley, suspected to be former escapees from Warrawong. The last confirmed record on mainland South Australia had been in 1975, near Renmark, nearly 300 kilometres (190 mi) away in the Riverland region. Cameras were set up in Sturt Gorge to try to photograph the shy creatures, but did not manage to do so.

Initially purchasing just 11 hectares (27 acres) in 2017, McPherson and Cobold were able to source another A$45,000 by crowdfunding in 2018, which covered most of the purchase price of the adjacent 5.6 ha (14-acre) Lake Cumbungi. Wamsley had created this lake as the main source of water for the ecosystem, but this had been cut off from the sanctuary in when it had been subdivided in 2003, and also lacked an electricity source after purchase. After lack of success with a solar pump, a volunteer with experience in the automotive industry had thought of using the V6 engine of a Holden Commodore to power a pump to bring water uphill from Lake Cumbungi so it could flow back down and create a "swamp". Walmsley had provided advice and assistance in adjusting the pH level to that preferred by the platypus.

== Today ==
In September 2020, a female platypus was seen nesting in the swamp. Further down the hill, there had been two breeding pairs in the previous season, and it is thought that this female was one of the offspring. Warrawong is thought to be the only remaining location of platypus on mainland South Australia. (There is an introduced population in Flinders Chase on Kangaroo Island.)

The sanctuary had to close during the COVID-19 pandemic in Australia, but was planning to reopen for the summer of 2020–2021.
