= Mount Zero-Taravale Sanctuary =

Nature reserve in Queensland, Australia

Coordinates: 19°02′57.55″S 146°06′53.44″E

Mount Zero-Taravale Sanctuary is a 600 km^{2} nature reserve in north-east Queensland, Australia, 60 km north-west of Townsville. It is owned and managed by the Australian Wildlife Conservancy (AWC). It is located on the boundary of the Wet Tropics bioregion and Einasleigh Uplands bioregion, adjacent to the Wet Tropics World Heritage Site. The property varies in altitude from 350 m in the south-west to 1,050 m in the north-east, and in landform from rugged mountains to a broad alluvial valley. The vegetation includes rainforest, grassy eucalypt woodlands and open hoop pine woodlands. Annual rainfall varies from 900 mm in the southern section to 1300 mm in the north-east.

== History ==
Mount Zero and Taravale were separate pastoral leases primarily managed for cattle grazing for over 50 years. Mount Zero was acquired by AWC in 2002, and Taravale in 2003, with assistance from the Natural Heritage Trust. As well as cattle grazing, some small-scale tin-mining and selective logging has taken place on the property before acquisition by AWC.

== Fauna ==
Threatened fauna found on Mount Zero-Taravale include the southern cassowary, masked owl, northern bettong and northern quoll.
