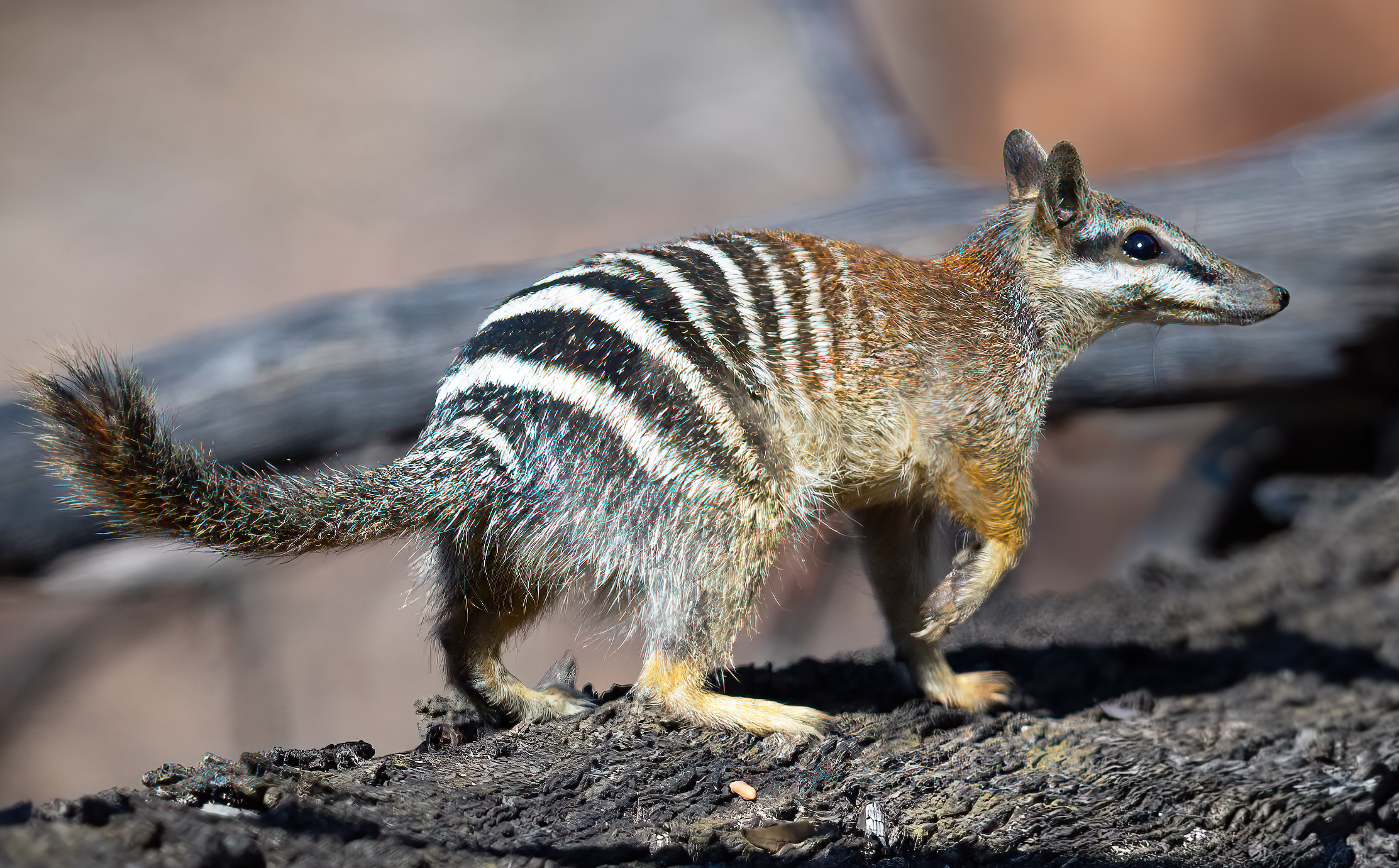

Conservation status
- Near Threatened (IUCN 3.1)

- Endangered (EPBC Act)

Scientific classification
- Kingdom: Animalia
- Phylum: Chordata
- Class: Mammalia
- Infraclass: Marsupialia
- Order: Dasyuromorphia
- Family: Myrmecobiidae; Waterhouse, 1841
- Genus: Myrmecobius; Waterhouse, 1836
- Species: M. fasciatus

Binomial name
- Myrmecobius fasciatus Waterhouse, 1836

Subspecies
- M. fasciatus fasciatus; †M. fasciatus rufus
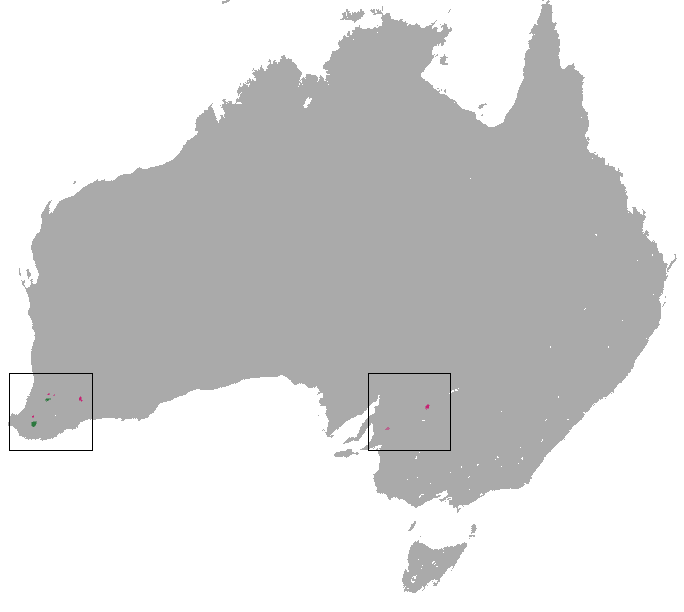
- Numbat range (green – native, pink – reintroduced)

= Numbat =

Numbat Temporal range: Oligocene-present

Species of Australian marsupial

The numbat (/ˈnʌmbæt/; binomen: Myrmecobius fasciatus), also known as the noombat or walpurti, is an insectivorous marsupial. It is diurnal and its diet consists almost exclusively of termites.

The species was once widespread across southern Australia, but is now restricted to several small colonies in Western Australia. It is therefore considered an endangered species and protected by conservation programs. Numbats were recently re-introduced to fenced reserves in South Australia and New South Wales. The numbat is the faunal emblem of Western Australia. World Numbat Day is celebrated each year on the first Saturday in November.

== Taxonomy ==
The numbat genus Myrmecobius is the sole member of the family Myrmecobiidae, one of four families that make up the order Dasyuromorphia, the Australian marsupial carnivores.

The species is not closely related to other extant marsupials; the current arrangement in the order Dasyuromorphia places its monotypic family with the diverse and carnivorous species of Dasyuridae. Genetic studies have shown that the ancestors of the numbat diverged from other marsupials between 32 and 42 million years ago, during the late Eocene.

Two subspecies have been described, but one of these—the rusty coloured Myrmecobius fasciatus rufus Finlayson, 1933,—has been extinct since at least the 1960s, and only the nominate subspecies (M. fasciatus fasciatus) is extant. The population described by Finlayson occurred in the arid central regions of South Australia, and he thought they had once extended to the coast. The separation into subspecies was not recognised in the national census of Australian mammals, following W. D. L. Ride and others. (Note: Australian Faunal Directory citing Mahoney, J.A. & Ride, W.D.L. 1988. Myrmecobiidae. pp. 34-35 in Walton, D.W. (ed.). Zoological Catalogue of Australia Volume 5. Mammalia. Canberra : Australian Government Publishing Service 274 pp.; Ride, W.D.L. 1970. A Guide to the Native Mammals of Australia. Melbourne : Oxford University Press xiv 249 pp. 62 pls.) As its name implies, M. fasciatus rufus had a more reddish coat than the surviving population. Only a very small number of fossil specimens are known, the oldest dating back to the Pleistocene, and no other species from the same family have been identified.

The following is a phylogenetic tree based on mitochondrial genome sequences:

- Dasyuromorphia
  - †Thylacinus (thylacine)
  - - Myrmecobius (numbat)
    - - Sminthopsis (dunnarts)
      - - Phascogale (wambengers)
        - Dasyurus (quolls)

Placement of the family within the order of dasyuromorphs may be summarised as

- Order Dasyuromorphia
  - Family Thylacinidae
  - Family Dasyuridae (72 species in 20 genera)
  - Family Myrmecobiidae
    - Genus Myrmecobius
      - Species Myrmecobius fasciatus
  - Family †Malleodectidae

The common names are adopted from the extant names at the time of English colonisation, numbat, from the Nyungar language of southwest Australia, and walpurti, the name in the Pitjantjatjara dialect. The orthography and pronunciation of the Nyungar name is regularised, following a survey of published sources and contemporary consultation that resulted in the name noombat', pronounced noom'bat.

Other names include banded anteater and marsupial anteater.

== Description ==
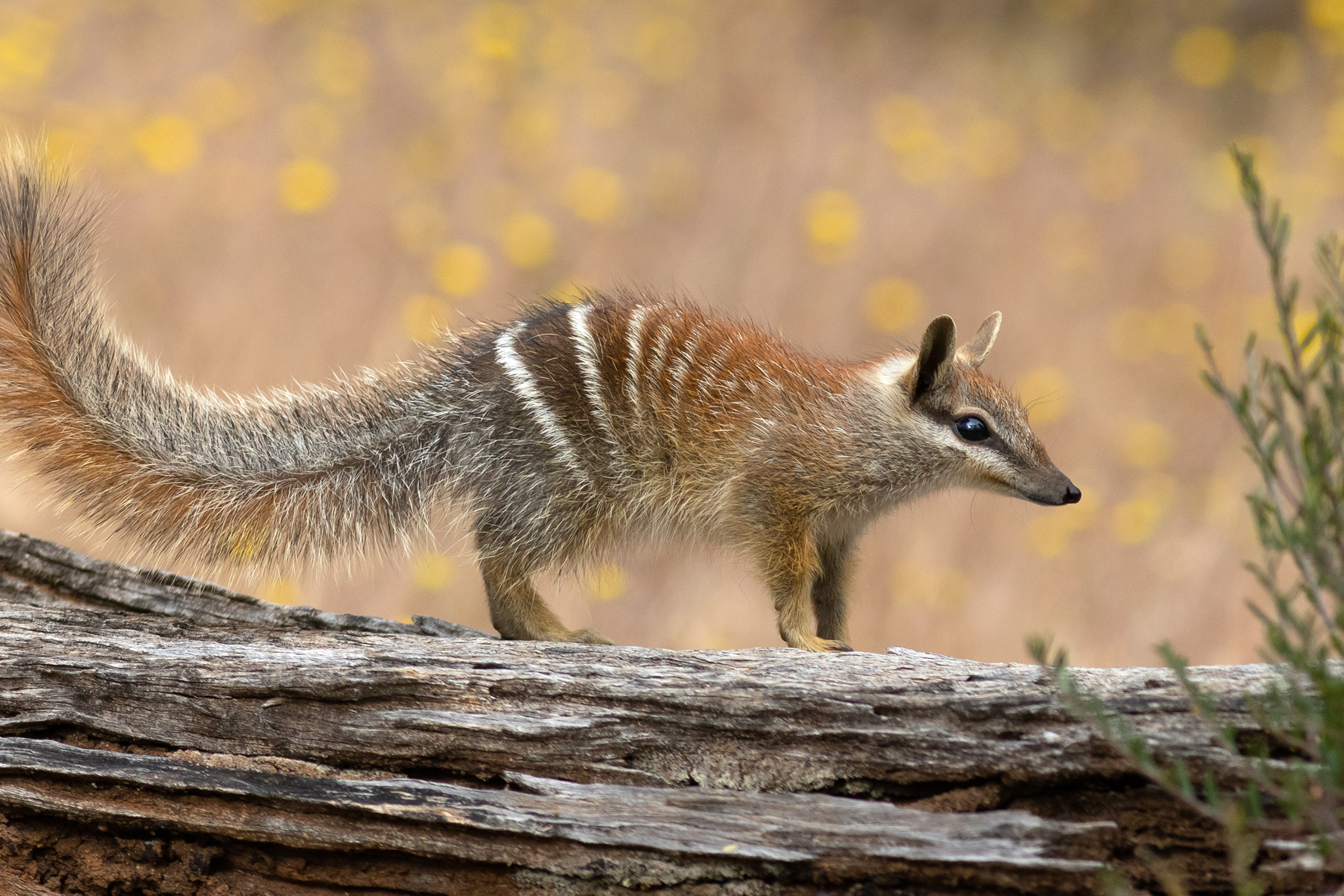
Wild numbat in Western Australia

The numbat is a small, distinctively-striped animal between 35 and 45 centimetres (14 and 18 in) long, including the tail, with a finely pointed muzzle and a prominent, bushy tail about the same length as its body. They have five toes on the fore feet, and four on the hind feet. Colour varies considerably, from soft grey to reddish-brown, often with an area of brick red on the upper back, and always with a conspicuous black stripe running from the tip of the muzzle through the eye to the base of the small, round-tipped ear. Between four and eleven white stripes cross the animal's hindquarters, which gradually become fainter towards the midback. The underside is cream or light grey, while the tail is covered with long, grey hair flecked with white. Weight varies between 280 and 700 g (10 and 24 1/2 oz). Numbats also possess a sternal scent gland, which may be used for marking their territories.

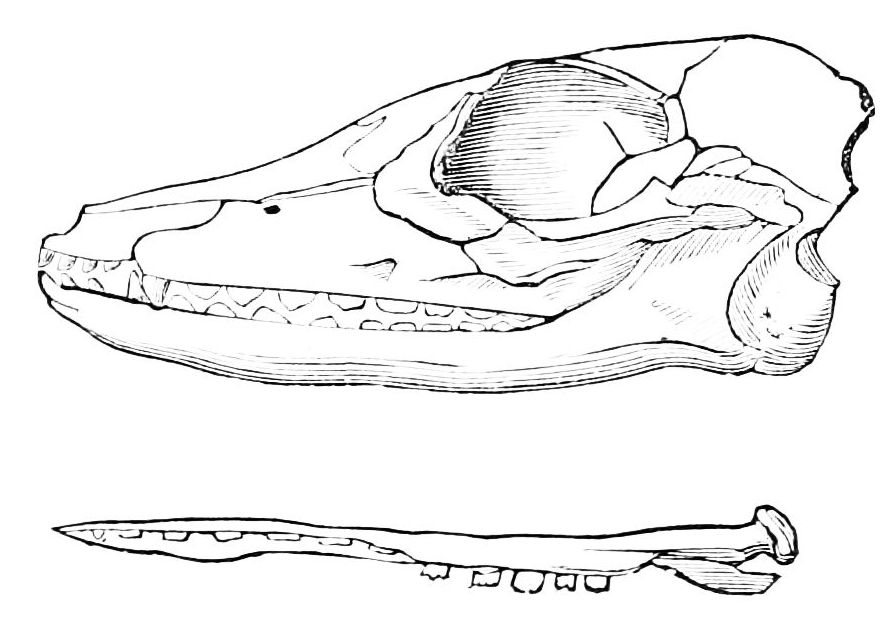
Skull of a numbat; illustration

Unlike most other small marsupials, the numbat is diurnal, largely because of the constraints of having a specialised diet without having the usual physical equipment for it; most ecosystems with a generous supply of termites have a fairly large creature with powerful forelimbs bearing heavy claws, such as anteaters, aardvarks, and pangolins. Like other mammals that eat termites or ants (myrmecophages), the numbat has a "degenerate" jaw with up to 50 tiny, nonfunctional teeth, and although it is able to chew, rarely does so because of the soft nature of its diet. Uniquely among terrestrial mammals, an additional cheek tooth is located between the premolars and molars; whether this represents a supernumerary molar tooth or a deciduous tooth retained into adult life is unclear. As a result, although not all individuals have the same dental formula, in general, it follows the unique pattern: 4.1.3.1.43.1.4.1.4

Akin to other myrmecophages, the numbat has a long and narrow tongue coated with sticky saliva produced by large submandibular glands. A further adaptation to the diet is the presence of numerous ridges along the soft palate, which apparently help to scrape termites off the tongue so they can be swallowed. The digestive system is relatively simple and lacks many of the adaptations found in other insectivorous animals, presumably because termites are easier to digest than ants, having a softer exoskeleton. Numbats are apparently able to gain a considerable amount of water from their diets, since their kidneys lack the usual specialisations for retaining water found in other animals living in their arid environment. Although the numbat finds termite mounds primarily using scent, it has the highest visual acuity of any marsupial, and, unusually for marsupials, has a high proportion of cone cells in the retina. These are both likely adaptations for its diurnal habits, and vision does appear to be the primary sense used to detect potential predators.

== Distribution and habitat ==
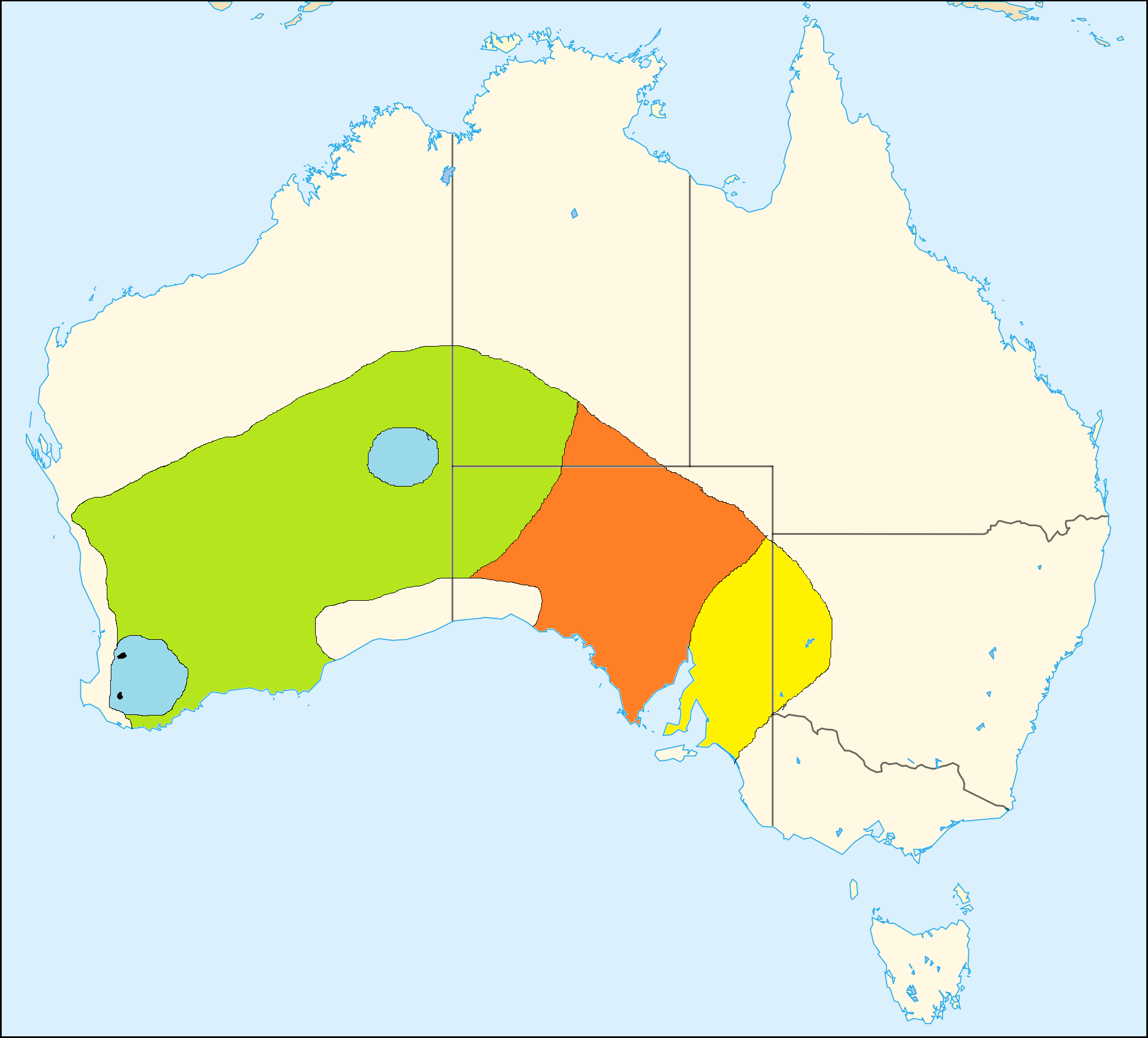
Historical range map of the numbat with extinctions shown in yellow (1800–1910), orange (1910–1930), green (1930–1960), and blue (1960–1980), and with its remaining range shown in black

Numbats were formerly widely distributed across southern Australia, from Western Australia to north-western New South Wales. However, their range has significantly decreased since the arrival of Europeans, and the species has survived only in two small patches of land in the Dryandra Woodland and the Tone-Perup Nature Reserve, both in Western Australia.

Today, numbats are naturally found only in areas of eucalypt forest, but they were once more widespread in other types of semiarid woodland, spinifex grassland, and in terrain dominated by sand dune. There are estimated to be fewer than 1,000 left in the wild.

After measures aimed at excluding feral cats, the number of numbats trapped during annual population surveys in the Dryandra Woodland had increased to 35 by November 2020, after recording just 10 in 2019 and 5 in 2018. There had not been so many numbats recorded since 36 were recorded in the 1990s.

The species has been successfully reintroduced into three fenced, feral predator-proof reserves in more varied environments; Yookamurra Sanctuary in the mallee of South Australia, Scotia Sanctuary in semi-arid NSW, and Western Australia's Mount Gibson Sanctuary. Reintroduction began at large fenced reserves in Mallee Cliffs National Park in NSW in December 2020, and on South Australia's Eyre Peninsula in 2022.

Attempted reintroductions of the species to fenced reserves in two other areas – one in the South Australian arid zone, near Roxby Downs, and the other in the northernmost part of its former range, at Newhaven Sanctuary in the Northern Territory – both failed.

There are plans to reintroduce the species to a managed and semi-fenced area of the southern Yorke Peninsula in South Australia, as part of the Marna Banggara (formerly Great Southern Ark) project.

== Ecology and habits ==
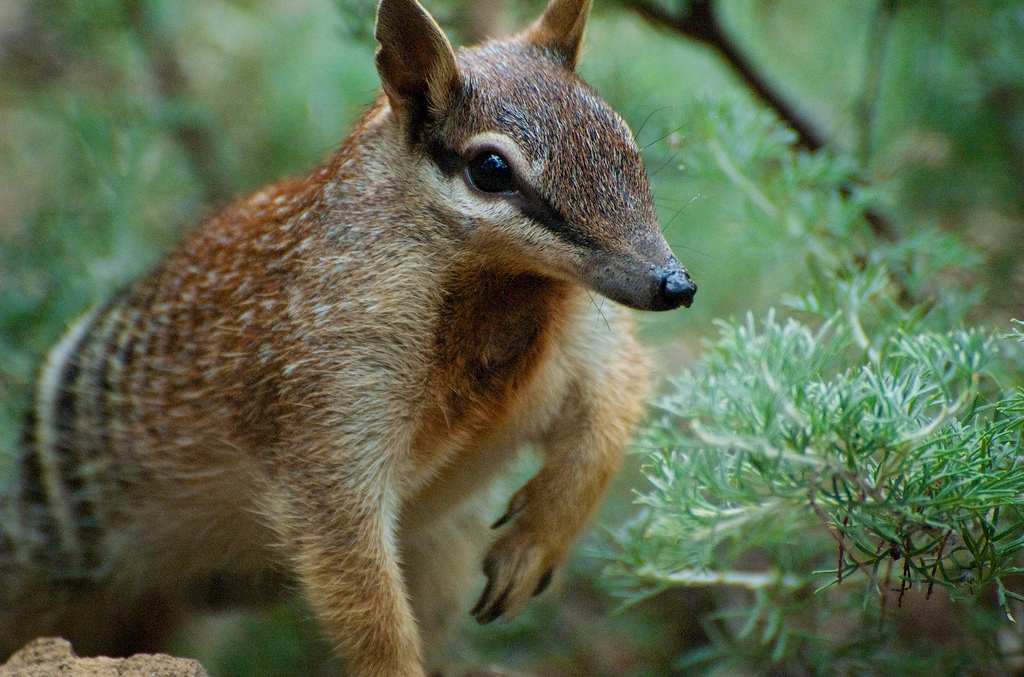
Adult numbat at Perth Zoo

Numbats are insectivores and subsist on a diet of termites (of the genera Heterotermes, Coptotermes, Amitermes, Microcerotermes, Termes, Paracapritermes, Nasutitermes, Tumulitermes, and Occasitermes). An adult numbat requires up to 20,000 termites each day. The only marsupial fully active by day, the numbat spends most of its time searching for termites. It digs them up from loose earth with its front claws and captures them with its long, sticky tongue. Because termites have a high water content Numbats obtain most of their water needs directly from their food, allowing them to survive in dry Australian habitats. Despite its banded anteater name, it apparently does not intentionally eat ants; although the remains of ants have occasionally been found in numbat excreta, these belong to species that themselves prey on termites, so were presumably eaten accidentally, along with the main food. Known native predators include various reptiles and raptors, such as the carpet python, sand goanna, wedge-tailed eagle, collared sparrowhawk, brown goshawk, and the little eagle. They are also preyed upon by invasive red foxes and feral cats.

Adult numbats are solitary and territorial; an individual male or female establishes a territory of up to 1.5 square km (370 acres) early in life, and defends it from others of the same sex. The animal generally remains within that territory from then on; male and female territories overlap, and in the breeding season, males will venture outside their normal home ranges to find mates.

While the numbat has relatively powerful claws for its size, it is not strong enough to get at termites inside their concrete-like mounds, and so must wait until the termites are active. It uses a well-developed sense of smell to locate the shallow and unfortified underground galleries that termites construct between the nest and their feeding sites; these are usually only a short distance below the surface of the soil, and vulnerable to the numbat's digging claws.

The numbat synchronises its day with termite activity, which is temperature dependent: in winter, it feeds from midmorning to midafternoon; in summer, it rises earlier, takes shelter during the heat of the day, and feeds again in the late afternoon. Numbats can enter a state of torpor, which may last up to fifteen hours a day during the winter months.

At night, the numbat retreats to a nest, which can be in a log or tree hollow, or in a burrow, typically a narrow shaft 1–2 m (3 ft 3 in – 6 ft 7 in) long which terminates in a spherical chamber lined with soft plant material: grass, leaves, flowers, and shredded bark. The numbat is able to block the opening of its nest, with the thick hide of its rump to prevent a predator being able to accessing the burrow.

Numbats have relatively few vocalisations, but have been reported to hiss, growl, or make a repetitive 'tut' sound when disturbed.

=== Reproduction ===
Numbats breed in February and March (late austral summer), normally producing one litter a year. They can produce a second if the first is lost. Gestation lasts 15 days, and results in the birth of four young. Unusual for marsupials, female numbats have no pouch, although the four teats are protected by a patch of crimped, golden hair and by the swelling of the surrounding abdomen and thighs during lactation.

The young are 2 cm (0.79 in) long at birth. They crawl immediately to the teats and remain attached until late July or early August, by which time they have grown to 7.5 cm (3.0 in). They are 3 cm (1.2 in) long when they first develop fur, and the patterning of the adult begins to appear once they reach 5.5 cm (2.2 in). The young are left in a nest or carried on the mother's back after weaning, becoming fully independent by November. Females are sexually mature by the following summer, but males do not reach maturity for another year.

== Relation to humans ==
=== Early records ===
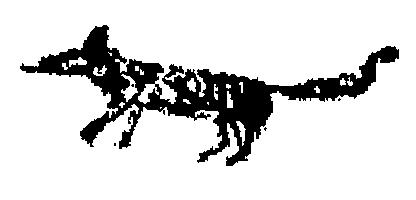
A reproduction of Moore's 1831 drawing of a numbat

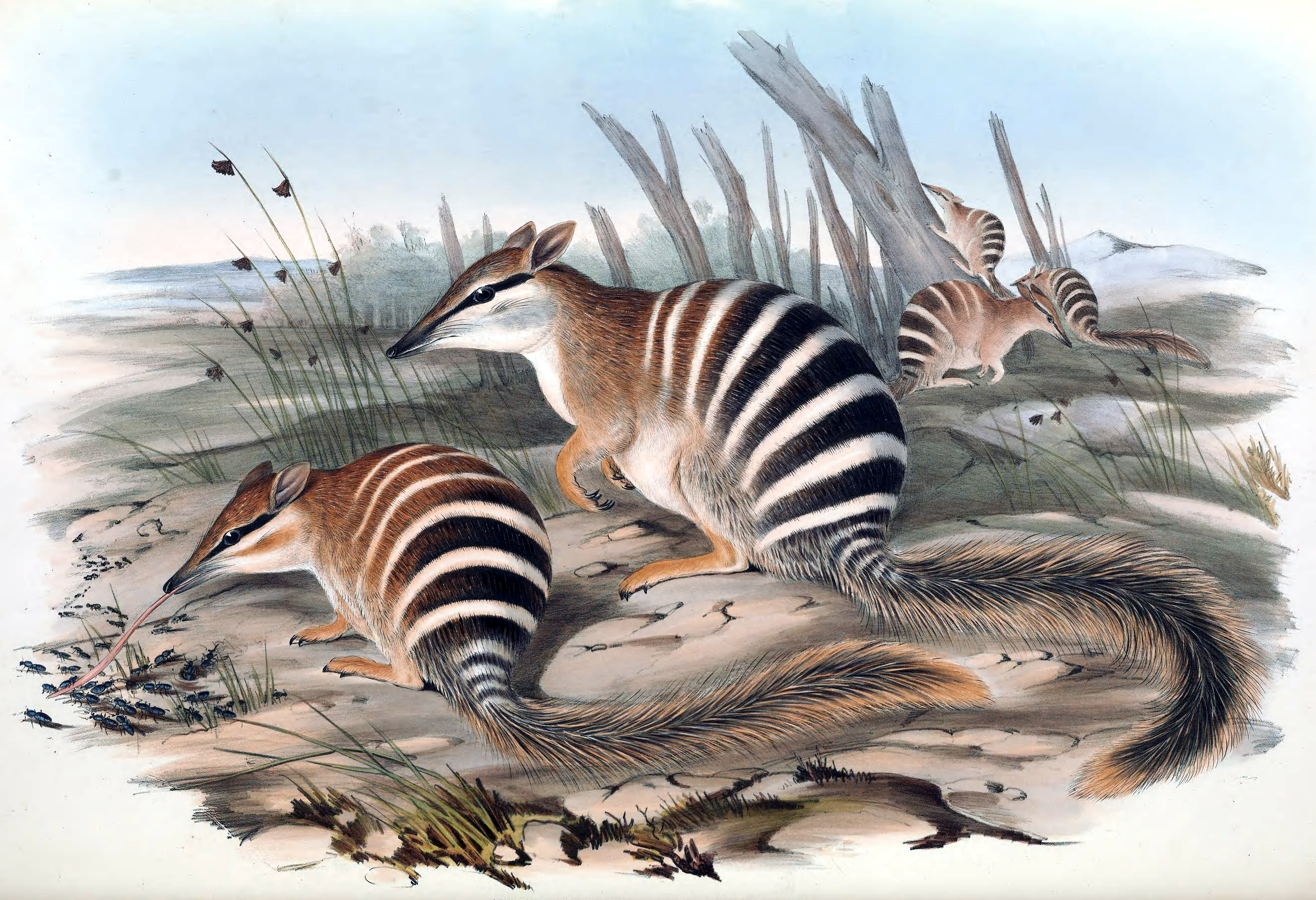
Myrmecobius fasciatus; Richter, 1845

The numbat first became known to Europeans in 1831. It was discovered by an exploration party exploring the Avon Valley under the leadership of Robert Dale. George Fletcher Moore, who was a member of the expedition, drew a picture in his diary on 22 September 1831, and recounted the discovery:

Saw a beautiful animal; but, as it escaped into the hollow of a tree, could not ascertain whether it was a species of squirrel, weasel, or wild cat...

and the following day:

chased another little animal, such as had escaped from us yesterday, into a hollow tree, where we captured it; from the length of its tongue, and other circumstances, we conjecture that it is an ant-eater—its colour yellowish, barred with black and white streaks across the hinder part of the back; its length about twelve inches.

The first classification of specimens was published by George Robert Waterhouse, describing the species in 1836 and the family in 1841.

Myrmecobius fasciatus was included in the first part of John Gould's The Mammals of Australia, issued in 1845, with a plate by H. C. Richter illustrating the species.

== Conservation status ==
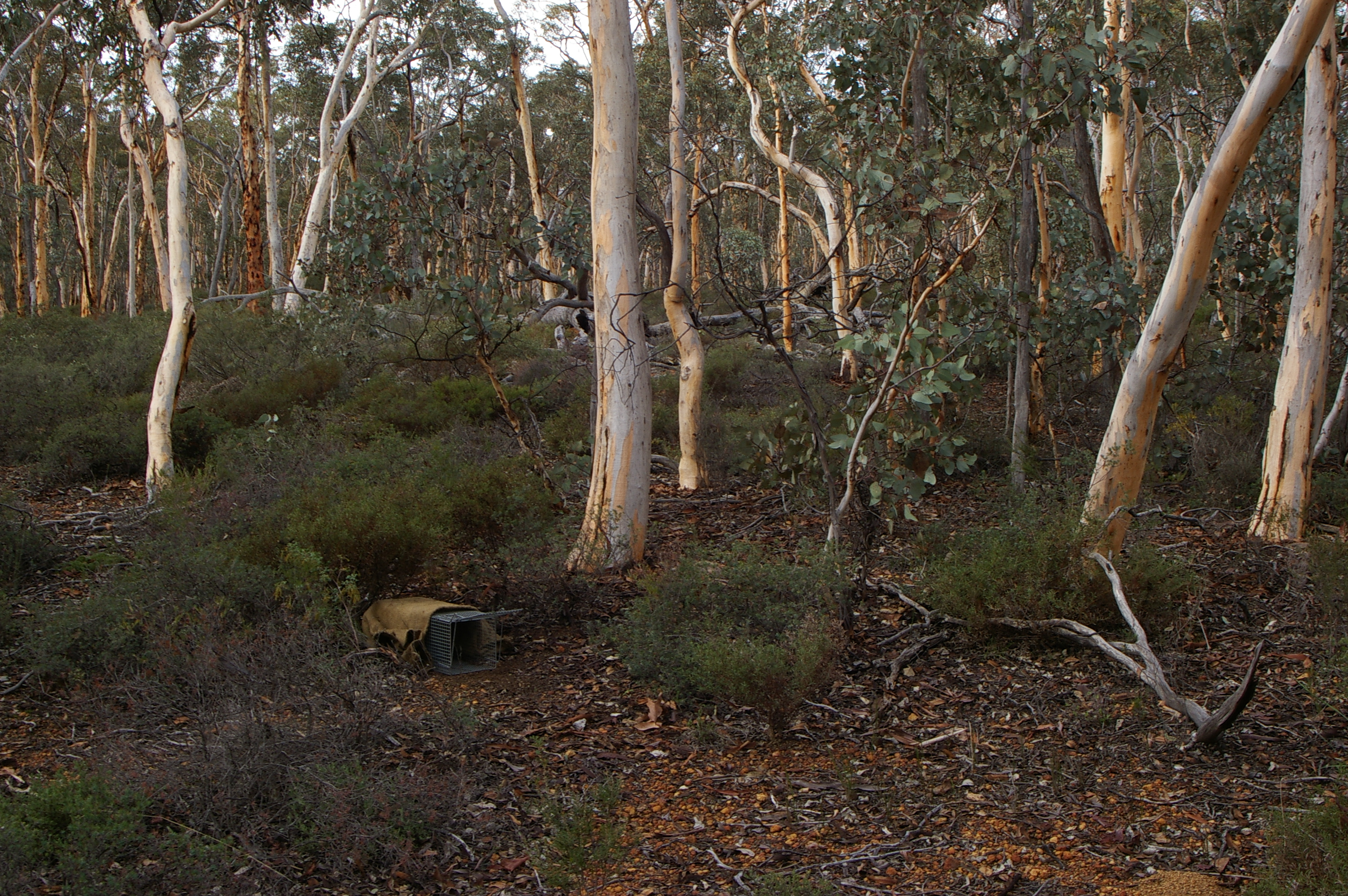
Trap set to monitor the wild population in the Dryandra Woodland

At the time of European colonisation, the numbat was found across western, central, and southern regions of Australia, extending as far east as New South Wales and Victorian state borders and as far north as the southwest corner of the Northern Territory. It was at home in a wide range of woodland and semiarid habitats. The deliberate release of the European red fox in the 19th century, however, is presumed to have wiped out the entire numbat population in Victoria, NSW, South Australia and the Northern Territory, and almost all numbats in Western Australia. By the late 1970s, the population was well under 1,000 individuals, concentrated in two small areas not far from Perth, at protected areas of the Dryandra forest and at Perup.

The population recognised and described as a subspecies by Finlayson, M. fasciatus rufus, is presumed to be extinct.

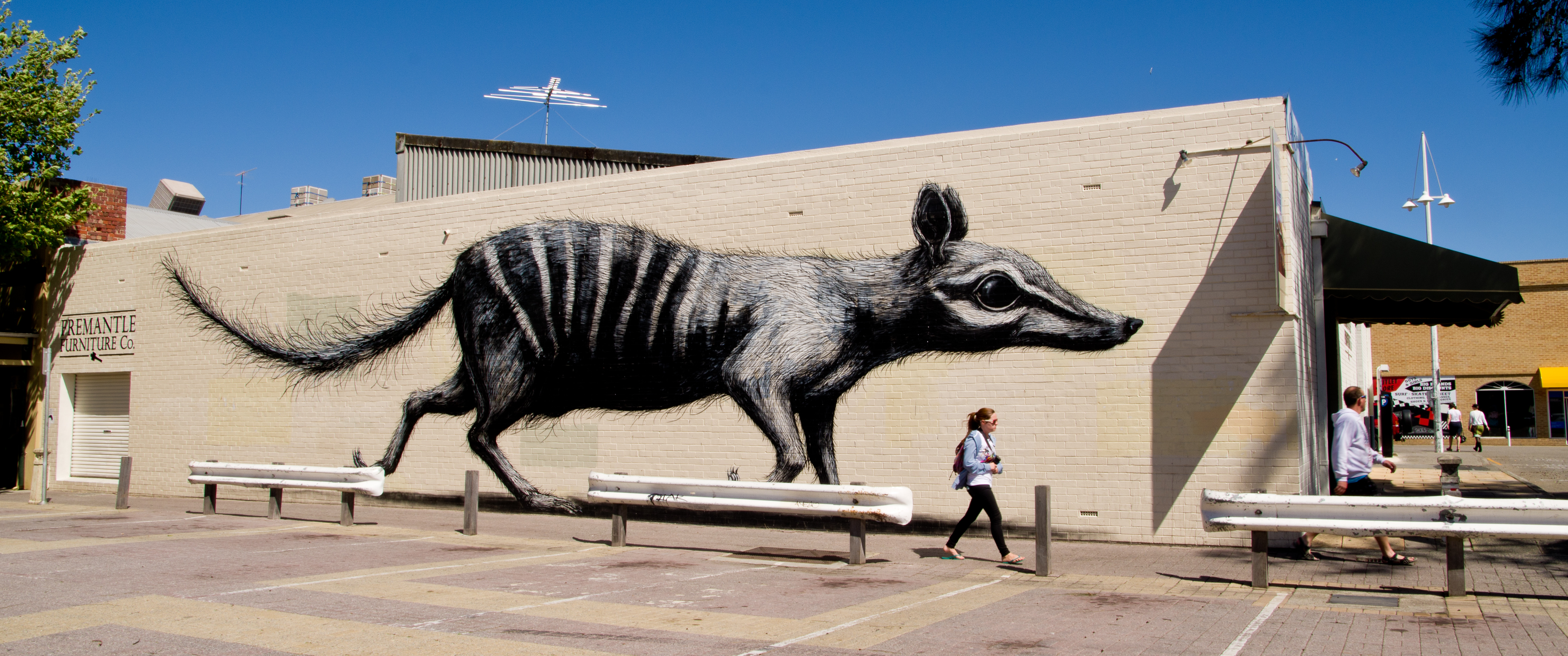
Mural of a numbat by Belgian street artist ROA in Fremantle, Western Australia

The first record of the species described it as beautiful, and its popular appeal led to its selection as the faunal emblem of the state of Western Australia and initiated efforts to conserve it from extinction.

The two small Western Australia populations apparently were able to survive because both areas have many hollow logs that may serve as refuge from predators. Being diurnal, the numbat is much more vulnerable to predation than most other marsupials of a similar size: its natural predators include the little eagle, brown goshawk, collared sparrowhawk, and carpet python. When the Western Australia government instituted an experimental program of fox baiting at Dryandra (one of the two remaining sites), numbat sightings increased by a factor of 40.

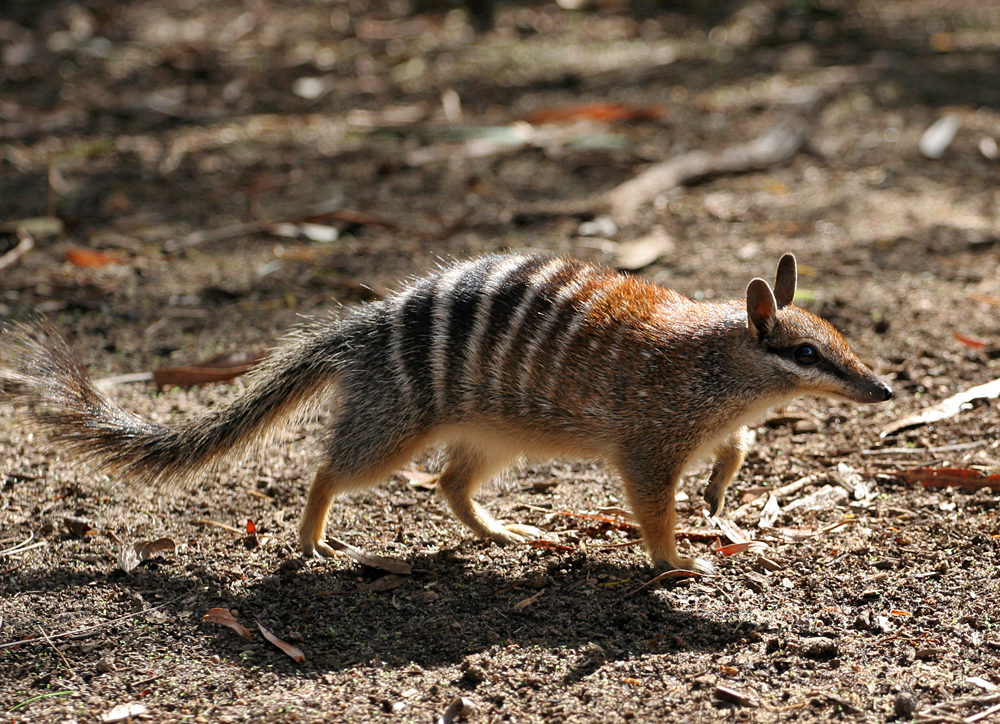
A numbat at the Perth Zoo

An intensive research and conservation program since 1980 has succeeded in increasing the numbat population substantially, and reintroductions to fox-free areas have begun. Perth Zoo is very closely involved in breeding this native species in captivity for release into the wild. Despite the encouraging degree of success so far, the numbat remains at considerable risk of extinction and is classified as an endangered species within Australia. In 2026, the IUCN Red List status was moved to "near threatened" after populations have risen and stabilized.

Since 2006, Project Numbat volunteers have helped to save the numbat from extinction. One of Project Numbat's main objectives is to raise funds that go towards conservation projects, and to raise awareness through presentations held by volunteers at schools, community groups and events.

Numbats can be successfully re-introduced into areas of their former range if protected from introduced predators.
