= Mornington Sanctuary =

Nature reserve in the Kimberley region

Coordinates: 17°31′44″S 126°06′12″E

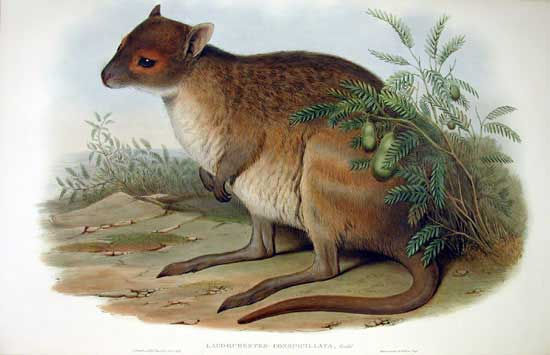
Spectacled hare-wallabies are likely to occur in the sanctuary

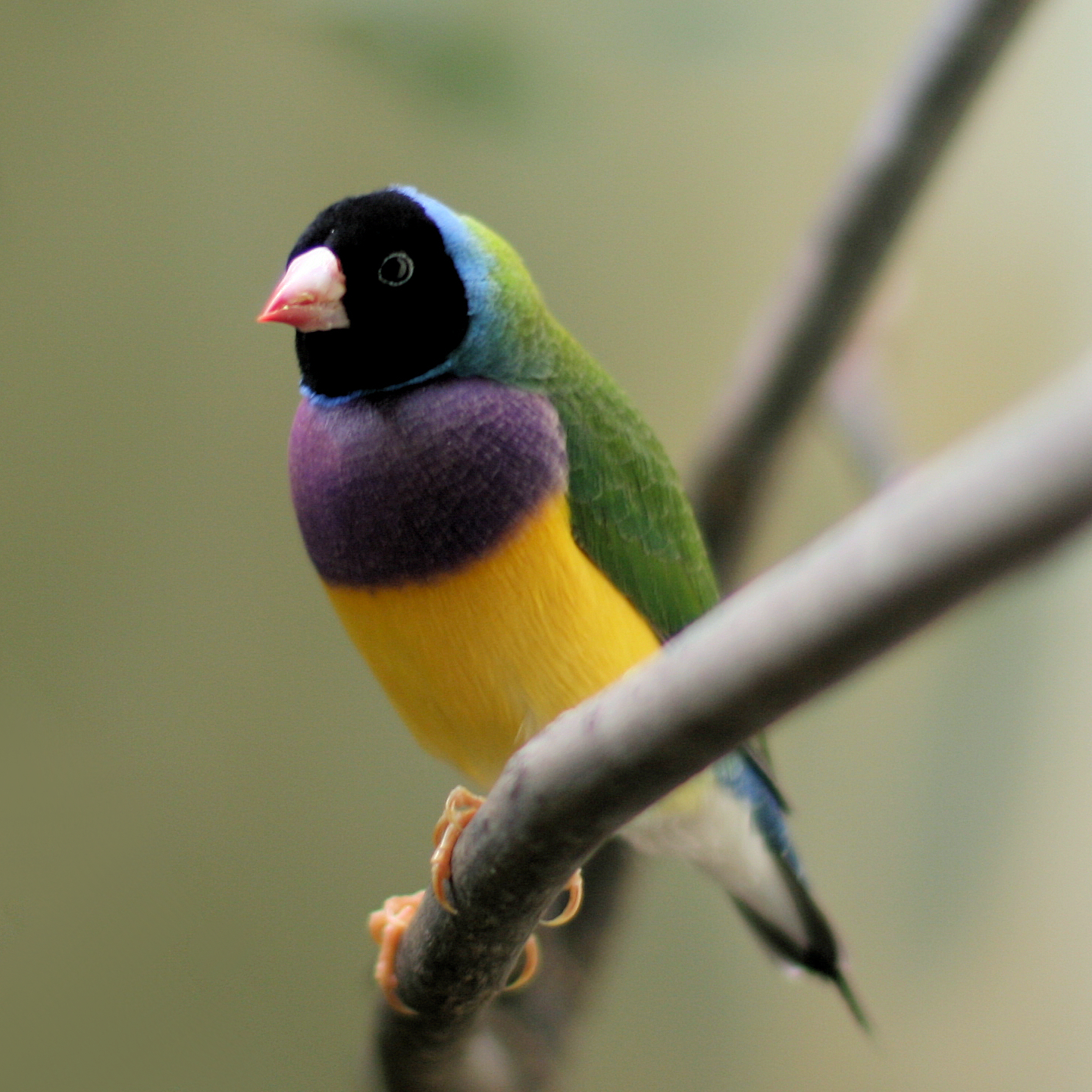
The sanctuary is an important area for Gouldian finches

Mornington Sanctuary, formerly Mornington Station, is a 3,582 km^{2} (1,383 sq mi) nature reserve in the Kimberley region of Western Australia. It contains the Mornington Wilderness Camp and is owned and managed by the Australian Wildlife Conservancy (AWC). It lies in the Pentecost subregion of the Central Kimberley Bioregion.

== History ==
Mornington is a pastoral lease that was run mainly as a beef cattle station for most of the 20th century. It was named after Victoria's Mornington Peninsula by Bob Maxted. It was acquired by AWC in 2001 for biodiversity conservation.

== Landscape and climate ==
Much of the landscape of the reserve is rugged; it contains a section of the Wunaamin-Miliwundi Ranges and the upper catchment of the Fitzroy River, as well as the mesas of the Baulk Face Range and Fitzroy Bluff. Tributaries of the Fitzroy River flow through vertically walled gorges, such as Dimond Gorge. Lake Gladstone, the largest wetland in the Kimberley, lies in the north-west part of the reserve. Vegetation is predominantly various forms of tropical savanna woodland and grassland regulated by frequent wildfires. Fragments of rainforest communities such as Livistona palm forests may be found in gullies and other areas protected from fires.

The climate is tropical and monsoonal with distinct wet (November–April) and dry (May–October) seasons. Average annual rainfall is about 700 mm.

== Wildlife ==
The reserve has been identified by BirdLife International as an Important Bird Area (IBA) because it supports significant populations of threatened red goshawks and Gouldian finches, as well as globally important populations of grey falcons, Australian bustards, chestnut-backed buttonquails, bush stone-curlews, white-quilled rock-pigeons, varied lorikeets, northern rosellas, purple-crowned fairywrens, silver-crowned friarbirds, white-gaped, yellow-tinted, bar-breasted and banded honeyeaters, sandstone shrike-thrushes, white-browed robins, spinifexbirds, painted firetails, masked and long-tailed finches.

Other threatened animals recorded from Mornington include freshwater crocodiles and northern quolls. Spectacled hare-wallabies, ghost bats and orange leaf-nosed bats are likely to occur.

== Access ==
Mornington Sanctuary is remote. Road access to the Wilderness Camp is by 4WD vehicles only, via the Gibb River Road and the 90 km no-through Mornington Road, and may be closed during the wet season. Driving distances and estimated times are:

- Broome - 550 kilometres (7 hours)
- Derby - 330 kilometres (5 hours)
- Fitzroy Crossing - 385 kilometres (6 hours)
- Kununurra - 565 kilometres (8 hours)

The Wilderness Camp has a 1,000 m (3,300 ft) airstrip; charter flights can be arranged.
