= Bowra Sanctuary =

- IUCN category VI (protected area with sustainable use of natural resources)
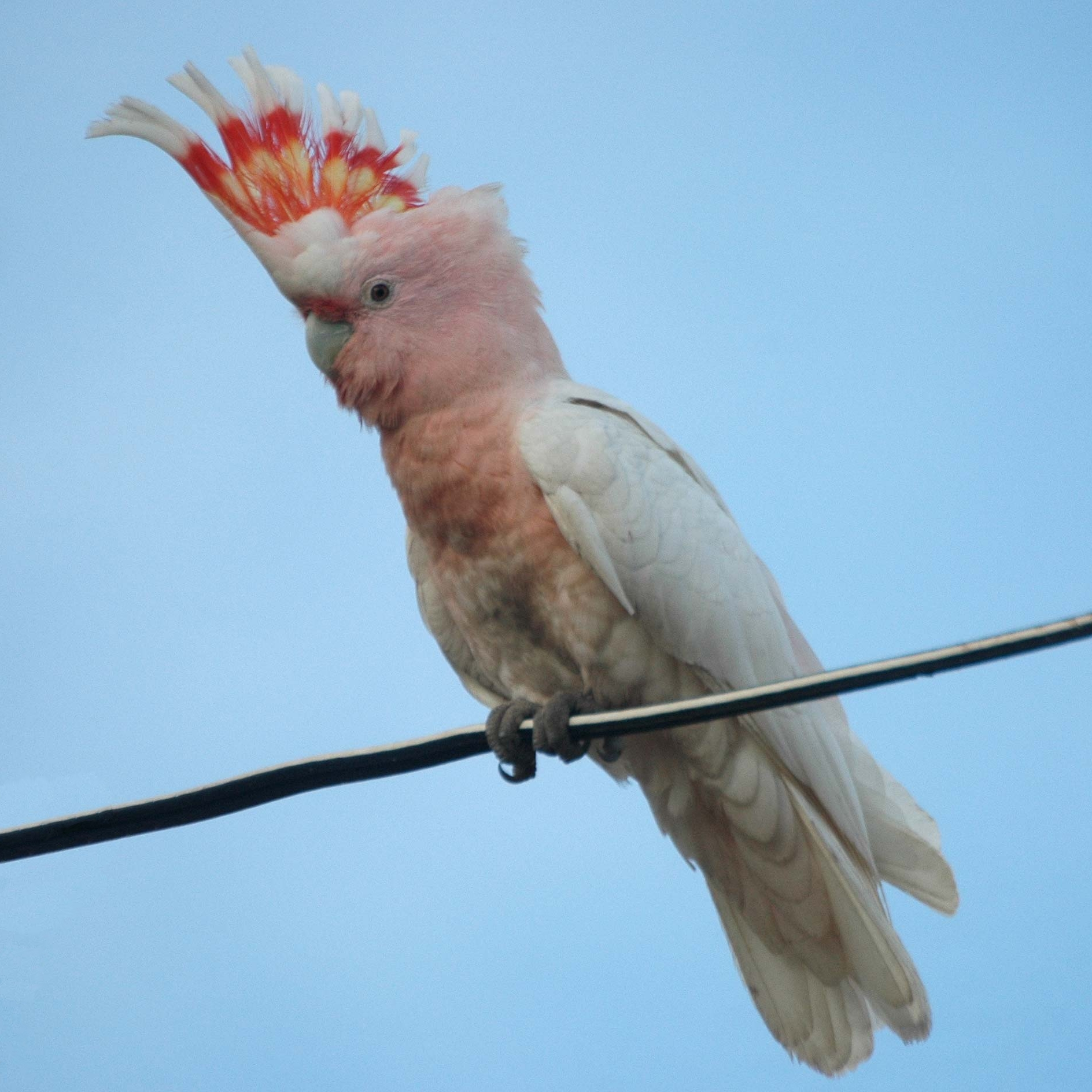
- Major Mitchell's cockatoo at Bowra Sanctuary

- Location within Queensland
- Location: Queensland
- Coordinates: 28°01′07″S 145°35′14″E
- Governing body: Australian Wildlife Conservancy

Bowra Sanctuary is a 140 km^{2} nature reserve near Cunnamulla in South West Queensland, Australia. It lies in the Mulga Lands bioregion on the Warrego River plains, in the catchment of the Warrego and Paroo Rivers. It is owned and managed by the Australian Wildlife Conservancy (AWC).

== History ==
A former cattle station held by the McLaren family for five generations, Bowra was purchased by the AWC in 2010 with assistance from the Federal Government's National Reserve System, from Birds Australia, Bird Observation & Conservation Australia and Birds Queensland, and from private donors.

== Ecosystems ==
Bowra is characterised by mulga communities, mixed with poplar box and bloodwoods, on the scarp and ridges in the north of the property. It also has alluvial plains covered by gidgee and coolabah open woodlands. river red gums line Gumholes Creek, the reserve's main watercourse; other wetlands include swamps and gilgais.

== Fauna ==
=== Birds ===
Over 200 species of birds have been recorded on Bowra, a popular destination for birdwatchers. They include 14 species of parrot and 18 diurnal raptors. Well-known residents are Hall's babbler, chestnut-breasted quail-thrush, Bourke's parrot and, while grey falcons breed there. Some threatened and declining species are Major Mitchell's cockatoo, painted honeyeater, squatter pigeon, crested bellbird and diamond firetail. Among 50 species of waterbirds, the rare and elusive Australian painted snipe has been recorded.

=== Other vertebrates ===
A wide variety of mammals, reptiles and frogs are present on the reserve. Small mammals include the fat-tailed and stripe-faced dunnarts as well as the rare kultarr. The threatened Yakka skink has been recorded on the reserve, which also contains habitat suitable for the woma python.
