= Mount Gibson Sanctuary =

Protected area in Western Australia

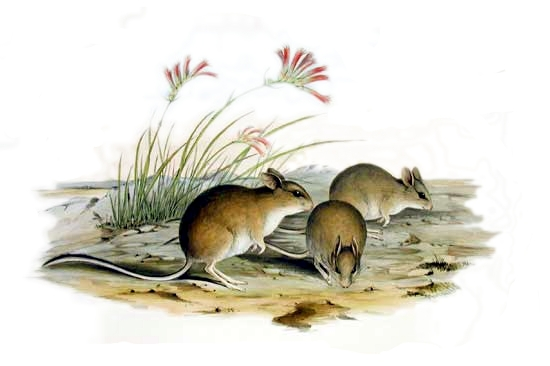
- The reserve is home to a population of Mitchell's Hopping Mouse

- Location within Western Australia
- Location: Western Australia
- Nearest city: Dalwallinu
- Coordinates: 29.724°S 117.1705°E
- Area: 1,305 km^{2} (504 sq mi)
- Established: 2001
- Governing body: Australian Wildlife Conservancy
- Website: Official website

Mount Gibson Sanctuary is a 1,305-square-kilometre (504 mi^{2}) nature reserve on the northern edge of the Wheatbelt and the southern margin of uncleared rangeland country, 350 kilometres (220 mi) north-east of Perth in mid-west Western Australia. The nearest large town is Dalwallinu. It is in the Avon-Wheatbelt Bioregion and is owned and managed by the Australian Wildlife Conservancy (AWC).

== History ==
Mount Gibson is a former pastoral lease, first granted in 1915 and used mainly for sheep grazing. More recently it was managed for its environmental values. It was acquired by AWC in 2001. Current programs include removal and control of feral animals, rehabilitation of degraded areas, and wildfire management.

== Landscape and climate ==
Mount Gibson contains rocky ranges, floodplains, claypans, salt-lakes and sand-plains. The climate is semi-arid with winter rainfall and hot, dry summers. Average annual rainfall is 250–300 millimetres (9.8–11.8 in).

== Ecosystems ==
Floristically, Mount Gibson contains elements of both the south-west region and the arid zone, due to its transitional location on the mulga-eucalypt line. Much of the reserve is dominated by Wheatbelt flora, largely cleared elsewhere, including extensive eucalypt woodlands, with stands of salmon gum, York gum and gimlet.

== Fauna ==
Both red and western grey kangaroos are found on the reserve, emphasizing the transitional nature of its location. Other mammals are Mitchell's hopping mouse and the little long-tailed dunnart. Significant bird species include malleefowl, Major Mitchell's cockatoo and regent parrot. Western quolls were reintroduced to the sanctuary in 2023 and 2024, outside the sanctuary's feral predator free area.

An indicator of floristic richness is a collection of over 100 species of native bees on the property.

=== Important Bird Area ===
The sanctuary, along with the neighbouring Charles Darwin Reserve, forms part of the 2,335-square-kilometre (902 mi^{2}) Mount Gibson and Charles Darwin Important Bird Area (IBA), so identified by BirdLife International principally because it supports populations of malleefowl and western corellas, as well as several other species restricted to either the arid or mallee biomes.

== See also ==
- Mount Gibson, Western Australia
