= Mallee Cliffs National Park =

National park in New South Wales, Australia

- IUCN category II (national park)
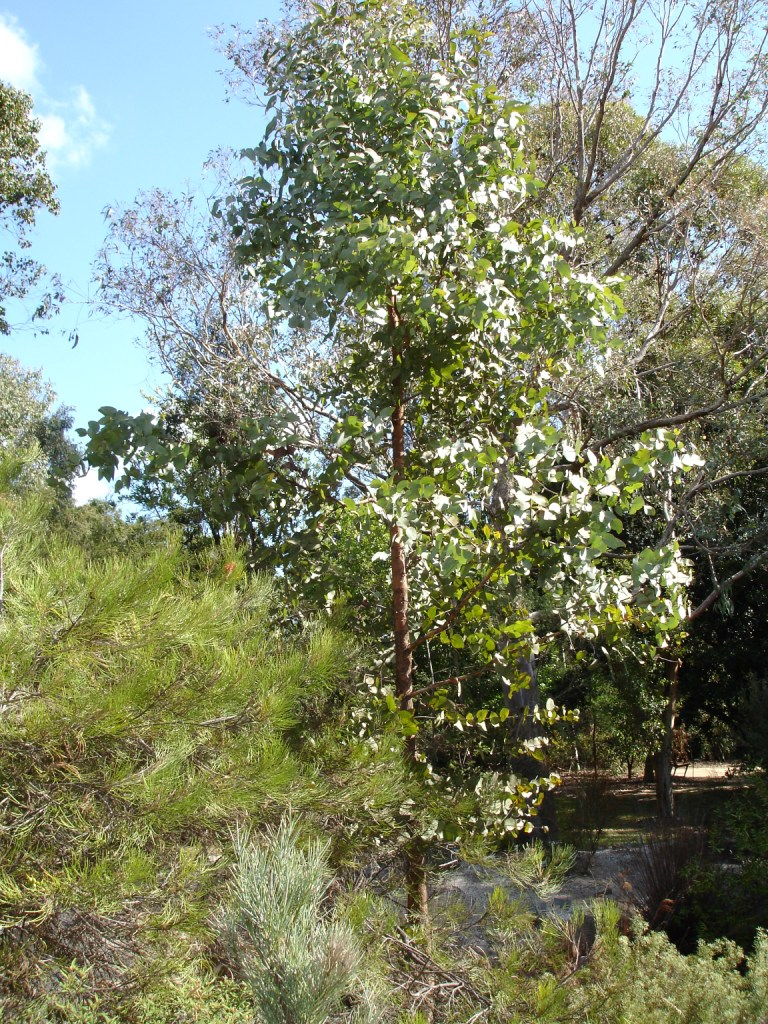
- White mallee

- Location within New South Wales
- Location: New South Wales
- Nearest city: Mildura, Victoria
- Coordinates: 34°10′31″S 142°34′39″E
- Area: 57,969 ha (223.82 sq mi)
- Established: April 1977
- Visitors: Restricted public access for education purposes
- Governing body: NSW National Parks & Wildlife Service
- Website: Official website

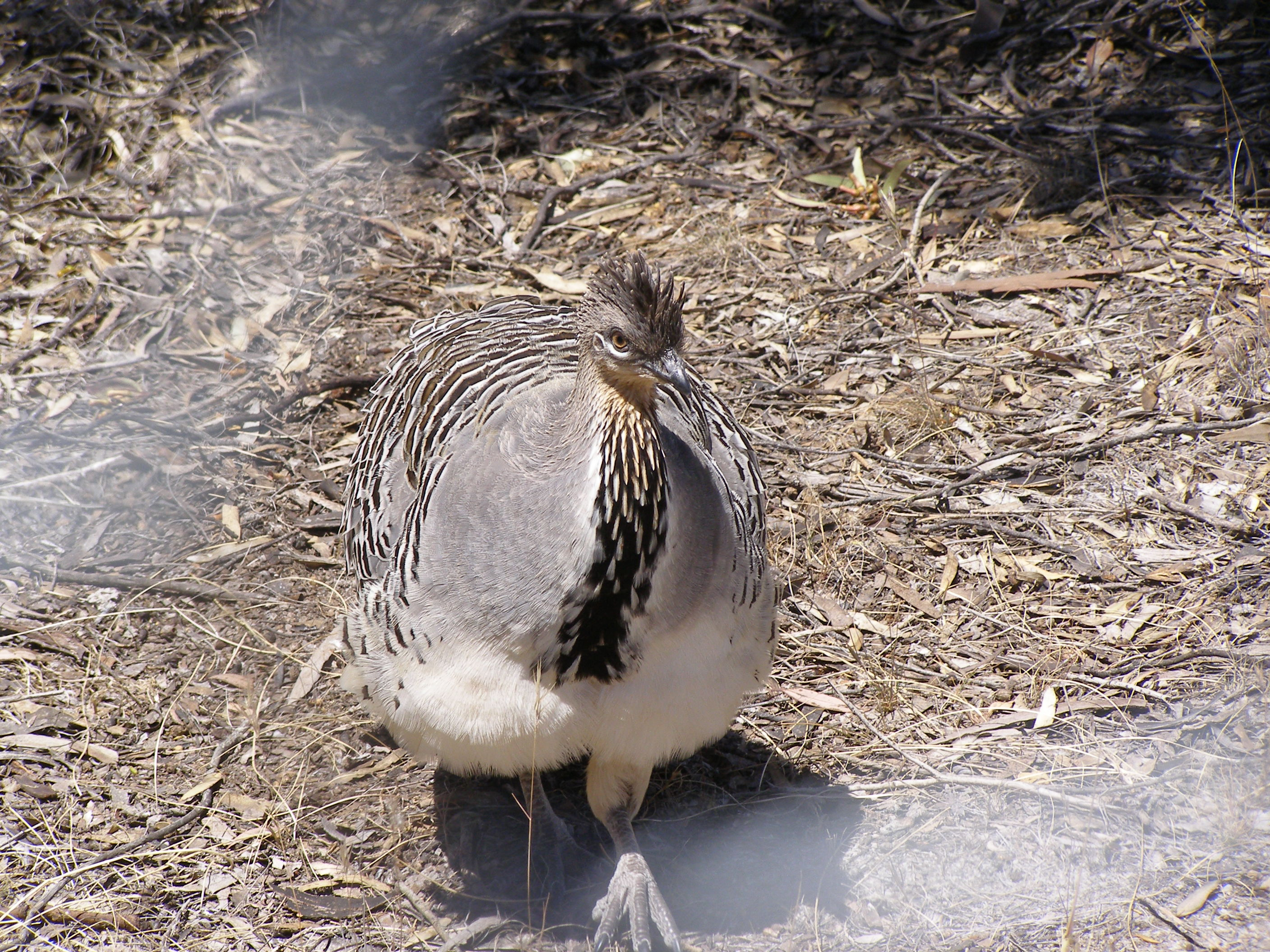
Malleefowl

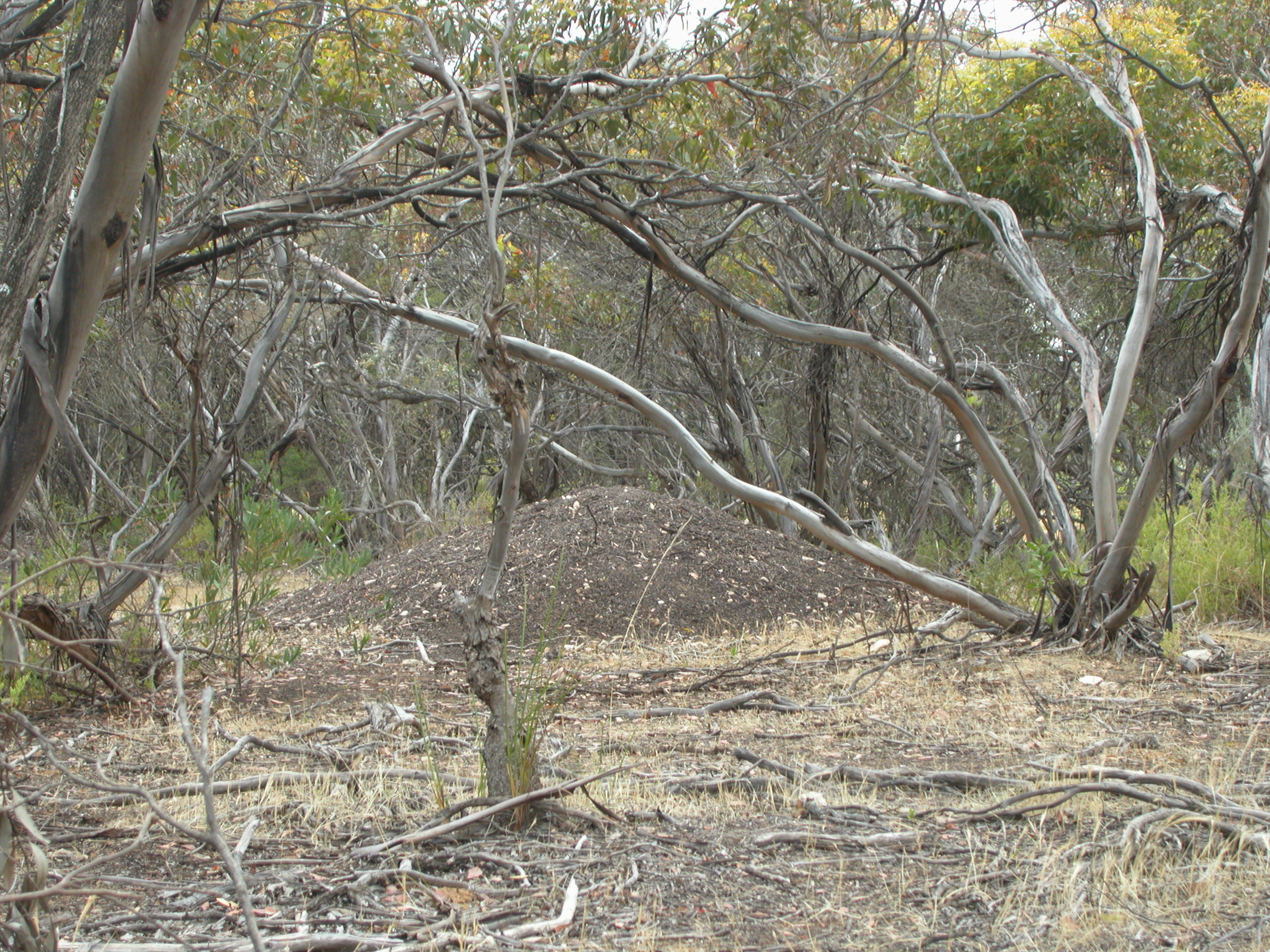
Malleefowl mound

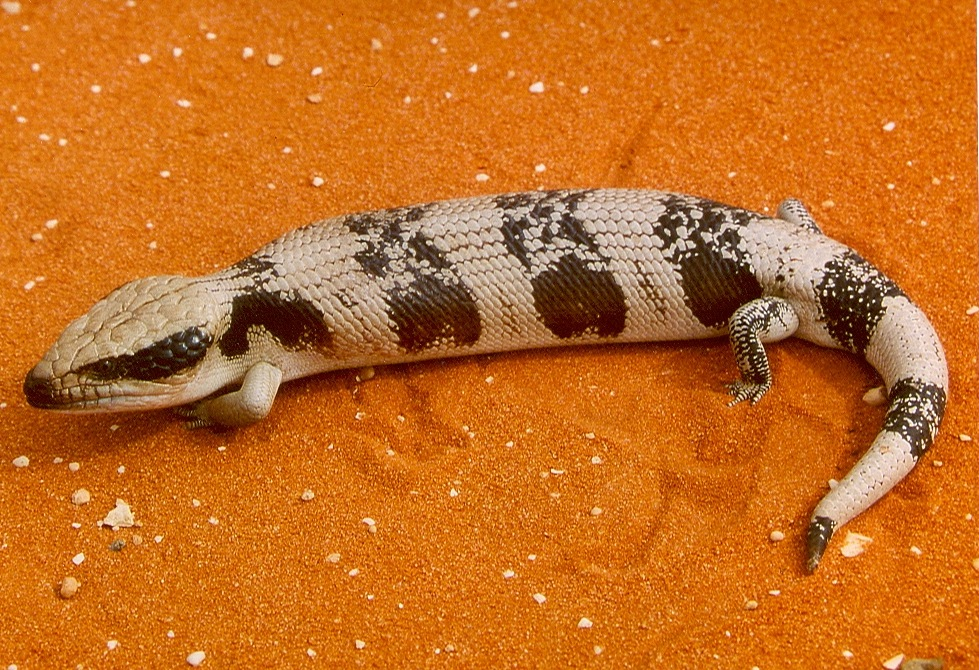
Western blue-tongue lizard

The Mallee Cliffs National Park is a protected national park in the Sunraysia region, in the south-west of New South Wales, Australia. The 57,969-hectare (143,240-acre) national park is situated approximately 790 kilometres (490 mi) west of Sydney and 30 kilometres (19 mi) east of the Murray River city of Mildura, Victoria.

The Mallee Cliffs National Park is managed to protect the sand plain and sand dune land systems and ecological communities known colloquially as Mallee Country. Emphasis is placed on its value as a wildlife conservation area and it was established primarily to protect the habitat of the malleefowl.

== History ==
The park was established in 1977, when the entire property was purchased by the Foundation for National Parks & Wildlife.

== Access ==
The park is closed to the public as part of an ongoing policy to protect malleefowl and other threatened animals, and to assist in meeting other conservation objectives. Access is limited to educational activities by schools and colleges, and research activities which are relevant to the management of the park and compatible with conservation policies.

== Environment ==
=== Geography ===
The Mallee Cliffs National Park preserves the original clay red plains of south west New South Wales, protecting extensive areas of flat to undulating sandy red plains and linear sand dunes formed during arid periods from 350,000 to 500,000 years ago.

=== Flora ===
The park preserves undisturbed tracts of mallee vegetation, and rosewood-belah woodland. Mallee are small eucalyptus trees and shrubs with many small stems and thick underground roots that retain water. Before irrigation farming began, dense thickets of mallee characterized most of northwestern Victoria, and areas of south-western New South Wales. The park contains an important representation of mallee communities, including both bull mallee and whipstick mallee. These flora types are continuing to be extensively cleared on private property for grazing both immediately outside the park and throughout the country. The park contains a number of isolated, relict plant communities that demonstrate shifts in the pattern of vegetation arising from long-term environmental change.

In January 1975 a bushfire ravaged the region which later became national park, making the average age of the vegetation considerably younger than similar protected areas. This makes the park a less attractive option for release of certain animals such as the black-eared miner, which use older trees and mallee bushes as habitat.

=== Fauna ===
The park lies within the Southern NSW Mallee Important Bird Area, identified by BirdLife International as supporting a significant population of the vulnerable malleefowl. The park is the only reserve in New South Wales with malleefowl habitat. The malleefowl is found in arid areas only where the mallee grows. The males build a nest for the eggs by digging a large pit in winter and filling it with leaves and grass over the next four months. The female lays one egg per day for several days in the spring. The male then covers the resulting mound with sand. As the compost heap rots it generates heat. The male keeps watch over the mound, and tests the temperature of the mound with his tongue, adding or removing sand. When the chick hatches, it digs its way out, and once they emerge at the top of the mound are renowned for standing stationary at the top for up to twenty minutes before racing/staggering off into the bush. The chicks hatch with feathers and are immediately independent, never needing any parental care. Malleefowl grow to a length of around 60 centimetres (24 in).

Several species of small birds are found in the area, as well as emus. Mammals include a significant population of western grey kangaroos as well as pygmy possums and the little pied bat and greater long-eared bat which use older trees as nesting hollows. The mallee spinifex of the park is the main habitat for the western blue-tongue and southern spinifex slender blue-tongue lizards.

In 2020, the endangered numbat was re-introduced to the Mallee Cliffs. Future releases will help bring the population to an expected maximum of 270 numbats within the national park.

Map of Mallee Cliffs National Park

== See also ==
- Protected areas of New South Wales
