= John Wamsley =

Australian environmentalist

John Wamsley (born 1938) is an Australian environmentalist. He was the Prime Minister's Environmentalist of the Year for 2003. Wamsley is known for his attempt to set up a network of wildlife sanctuaries across Australia.

Wamsley was born in Ourimbah, New South Wales in 1938. His passion for Australian wildlife was born when the seven-year-old Wamsley's family moved to a 67 hectare bushland block at Niagara Park. At age sixteen Wamsley became a trainee metallurgist with BHP. Dissatisfied with the job he became a labourer at BHP's Newcastle Steelworks and worked a second job renovating run down houses. By age 23 Wamsley was a millionaire. Approximately two years later Wamsley enrolled at the University of Newcastle. The thirty-year-old Wamsley graduated with a PhD in Mathematics and moved to Flinders University to lecture. His doctoral thesis from the University of Queensland, at only 70 pages, is among the shortest theses in the library.

June 1969 saw the purchase of a dairy farm at Mylor, South Australia, that was to become Wamsley's first sanctuary, Warrawong. Wamsley eradicated all feral plants and animals from the sanctuary and erected a surrounding fence to preserve the sanctuary's feral free state. Wamsley entered the public eye when he attended a tourism awards ceremony wearing a hat made from the pelt of a dead feral cat. The ensuing controversy led to a change in the law, allowing feral cats to be legally killed.

With the view to duplicating the success of the Warrawong wildlife sanctuary in South Australia, Earth Sanctuaries Limited (ESL) was floated on the Australian Securities Exchange in 2000. At its peak, ESL had 11 prospective sanctuaries in three states accounting for 100,000 hectares. ESL was successful in some rewilding and ecosystem restoration projects. By pioneering feral-proof fencing, native Australian animals were successfully re-introduced where they were locally extinct. However, the company was not financially successful. ESL was wound up and delisted in 2005. The sanctuaries were sold, and some remain in operation, including Mount Rothwell Biodiversity Interpretation Centre and several managed by the Australian Wildlife Conservancy. ESL was the world's first publicly listed company whose business was conservation.
