= List of World Heritage Sites in Australia =

Location of World Heritage Sites in Australia. Red dots are cultural sites, blue dots are natural, and orange dots are mixed sites. Four convict sites are in the Sydney area and five are in Tasmania. The convict site at Norfolk Island, as well as the Lord Howe Island, Macquarie Island, and Heard and McDonald Islands are not shown on the map. The Gondwana Rainforests comprise 41 sites in eastern Australia and are also not shown individually.

The United Nations Educational, Scientific and Cultural Organization (UNESCO) World Heritage Sites are places of importance to cultural or natural heritage as described in the UNESCO World Heritage Convention, established in 1972. Cultural heritage consists of monuments (such as architectural works, monumental sculptures, or inscriptions), groups of buildings, and sites (including archaeological sites). Natural features (consisting of physical and biological formations), geological and physiographical formations (including habitats of threatened species of animals and plants), and natural sites which are important from the point of view of science, conservation, or natural beauty, are defined as natural heritage. Australia accepted the convention on 22 August 1974. There are 21 World Heritage Sites in Australia, with a further 8 on the tentative list.

The first sites in Australia added to the list were the Great Barrier Reef, Kakadu National Park, and Willandra Lakes Region, at the fifth session of the World Heritage Committee, held in Sydney, in 1981. The most recent site listed was the Murujuga Cultural Landscape, in July 2025. Of these 21 sites, 5 are cultural, 12 are natural, and 4 are mixed, listed for both cultural and natural properties. Australia has served as a member of the World Heritage Committee five times, in 1976–1983, 1983–1989, 1995–2001, 2007–2011, and 2017–2021.

== World Heritage Sites ==
UNESCO lists sites under ten criteria; each entry must meet at least one of the criteria. Criteria i through vi are cultural, and vii through x are natural.

World Heritage Sites
| Site | Image | Location (state or territory) | Year listed | UNESCO data | Description |
|---|---|---|---|---|---|
| Kakadu National Park | Waterfall falling over rocky escarpment | Northern Territory | 1981 | 147quater; i, vi, vii, ix, x (mixed) | Aboriginal Australians have lived in Kakadu for more than 50,000 years. The rock carvings and cave paintings dating back thousands of years provide insight into the life of prehistoric hunter-gatherer societies, with traditions having survived until the present day. Rock art depicts humans and animals, including some species that have long been extinct. From the natural perspective, the park comprises a wide variety of ecosystems, including savanna woodlands, open forest, floodplains, mangroves, tidal mudflats, coasts, and monsoon forests. The wetland areas are protected as Ramsar sites. The park is home to numerous bird, reptile, and fish species. Boundary modifications of the site took place in 1987, 1992, and 2011. Jim Jim Falls is pictured. |
| Great Barrier Reef | Different types of corals, underwater photo | Queensland | 1981 | 154; vii, viii, ix, x (natural) | The Great Barrier Reef, extending 2,000 km (1,200 mi) along the Queensland coast, is the world's most extensive coral reef system, consisting of about 2,500 individual reefs and hundreds of islands and sandy cays. The reef is rich in marine life, with 400 types of coral, 1,500 species of fish, and 4,000 types of molluscs. It is also home to the endangered dugong and green sea turtle. The reef has been changing through millennia. The changes of the sea level during the Quaternary glaciation can be seen in old corals. Today, the reef is being shaped by erosion and climate change. |
| Willandra Lakes Region | Sandy dunes with rocky outcrops | New South Wales | 1981 | 167; iii, viii (mixed) | The lakes existed during the Pleistocene epoch and dried out about 18,500 years ago; since then, the area has been relatively undisturbed. Archaeologists evidence of human occupation, including a cremation dating to around 40,000 years BP, early stone tools, as well as fossils of giant marsupials. The sediments of the lakes provide insight into the changing climate and environment during the last 100,000 years, with cycles of glacial and interglacial periods. The dried up lake bed of Lake Mungo is pictured. |
| Tasmanian Wilderness | Landscape with mountains and shrubs | Tasmania | 1982 | 181quin; iii, iv, vi, vii, viii, ix, x (mixed) | Originally listed as the Western Tasmanian Wilderness National Parks and having seen four boundary modifications, the latest in 2013, the site covers a sizeable part of the island of Tasmania. The landscape has been shaped by the Quaternary glaciation and the land is now covered with temperate rainforest. There are numerous karst landforms. High rainfall results in wild river systems carving through the land, creating gorges and waterfalls. Aboriginal Australians already lived in the area at least 40,000 years ago and they formed the southernmost group of people during the Pleistocene. |
| Lord Howe Island Group | A pyramidal-shaped islet | New South Wales | 1982 | 186; vii, x (natural) | The group of volcanic islands and islets about 570 km (350 mi) off the mainland is rich in biodiversity and home to several endemic species, such as the Lord Howe woodhen. The Lord Howe Island phasmid, the largest stick insect, was thought to be extinct but was recently rediscovered in 2001 on the islet of Ball's Pyramid (pictured). The islands are important nesting sites for sea birds, including the providence petrel and red-tailed tropicbird. The waters around the island support the southernmost true coral reefs and represent a meeting point between tropical and temperate species. |
| Gondwana Rainforests of Australia | A waterfall in a rainforest | New South Wales, Queensland | 1986 | 368bis; viii, ix, x (natural) | The site comprises 41 protected areas (the Lamington National Park is pictured), mainly along the Great Escarpment. From the geological perspective, the area illustrates processes such as the creation of new continental margins following the breakup of the Gondwana supercontinent. Its subtropical rainforests are home to plant species, such as ferns that were prominent in the Carboniferous, or Araucarias, which originated in the Jurassic. As the rainforests are fragmented, the distance between them is contributing to ongoing speciation of animal and plant species. A significant boundary modification took place in 1994. |
| Uluṟu-Kata Tjuṯa National Park | Aerial photo of Uluru and Kata Tjuta rock formations | Northern Territory | 1987 | 447rev; v, vi, vii, viii (mixed) | The cultural landscape is dominated by the sandstone monolith Uluru (pictured in front) and the rock formation Kata Tjuta (pictured in the background) that are spiritually significant to the Aṉangu people, and form part of the tjukurpa belief system. Both formations are also known for their scenic beauty. From the geological perspective, both formations illustrate slow processes, such as the honeycomb weathering. Originally listed as Uluru National Park, the site was modified in 1994 to account for cultural criteria. |
| Wet Tropics of Queensland | Dense rainforest scene, with a small pool surrounded by ferns and moss-laden rocks | Queensland | 1987 | 486; vii, viii, ix, x (natural) | The site covers about 450 km (280 mi) of tropical rainforest that spread along the Great Dividing Range. The forests, that have persisted since the Gondwana times, host an exceptional level of biodiversity, with over 500 endemic species and the highest concentration of primitive plant taxa in the world, such as ferns and cycads. Even if the area covers a tiny part of Australia, it contains 30% of marsupial, 60% of bat, and 40% of bird species. Through mangrove forests, they from a terrestrial continuum with the Great Barrier Reef. The Daintree National Park is pictured. |
| Shark Bay, Western Australia | Scattered small black mounds growing in an area of shallows by the sea | Western Australia | 1991 | 578; vii, viii, ix, x (natural) | The seabed of Shark Bay features the largest and richest area of seagrass meadows in the world, home to the endangered dugongs. The hypersaline Hamelin Pool (pictured) contains the world's most diverse and abundant colony of living stromatolites. They provide insight into how some of the earliest microbial communities must have looked like. On land, the area represents the meeting point between the arid Eremaean vegetation, dominated by Acacia species, and the temperature South West, dominated by Eucalyptus. The area is home to threatened species such as the boodie, rufous hare-wallaby, banded hare-wallaby, Gould's mouse, and the Western barred bandicoot. |
| K'gari | A grassy hilltop overlooking a shallow sand beach, with thick forests in the background | Queensland | 1992 | 630; vii, viii, ix (natural) | At a length of 122 km (76 mi), K'gari is the world's largest sand island. It contains numerous freshwater lakes and dunes reaching up to 240 m (790 ft) above sea level. It is the only place in the world where tall rainforest grows on sand. The process of formation of the podzol soils, in places forming layers 25 m (82 ft) thick, is also unique. |
| Australian Fossil Mammal Sites (Riversleigh / Naracoorte) | Upright reconstruction of a Thylacoleo skeleton inside Naracoorte Caves, its shadow cast against the cave wall | South Australia, Queensland | 1994 | 698; viii, ix (natural) | The two sites provide some of the best fossil assemblages illustrating the unique evolution of mammals in Australia, resulting from almost complete isolation for 35 million years. The older site, at Riversleigh, has fossils from 30 to 10 million years ago (middle Cenozoic), documenting changes from humid tropical forests to dry forests and woodlands. The site at Naracoorte has fossils of Pleistocene megafauna, including Thylacoleo (pictured) and thylacine, declared extinct in the 20th century. The fossil record overlaps with the arrival of humans to Australia. |
| Heard and McDonald Islands | Satellite image of a snow-covered volcanic peak, with a glacier running straight into the ocean | Heard Island and McDonald Islands | 1997 | 577rev; viii, ix (natural) | These two islands are the only two active volcanoes in the subantarctic, and were inscribed for their value to research in glaciology and geomorphic processes, in particular plume volcanism and formation of oceanic and continental crust. Heard Island is mainly covered by glaciers (satellite image pictured). Because of their remoteness, the ecosystem is undisturbed, with no history of significant human impact or any introduced species. |
| Macquarie Island | Large rookery of king penguins, both adult and young, on a pebbled beach, with grassy hills in background | Tasmania | 1997 | 629rev; vii, viii (natural) | Located roughly halfway between Australia and Antarctica on the Macquarie Fault Zone, the island is the only place on earth where rocks from the Earth's mantle are being actively exposed above sea level in an ongoing tectonic process. This allows researchers to study the sequence of crustal levels that otherwise go all the way down to about 6 km (3.7 mi) below the ocean floor. The island is an important breeding ground for king penguins, royal penguins (pictured), four species of albatross, and elephant seals. |
| Greater Blue Mountains Area | Rugged sandstone cliff face with three large pinnacles, surrounded by a forested valley | New South Wales | 2000 | 917; ix, x (natural) | The sandstone plateau is covered by Eucalyptus forests and demonstrates the evolutionary adaptation of the genus to different habitats, with wet and dry sclerophyll forests, swamps, wetlands, grasslands, and mallee growths. The area is home to a substantial part of Australian biodiversity, both in animal and plant species. It also includes the only growing sites of the ancient relict species Pherosphaera fitzgeraldii and Wollemia nobilis. The Three Sisters rock formation is pictured. |
| Purnululu National Park | Large red sandstone rock formation surrounded by shrubbery and open plains | Western Australia | 2003 | 1094; viii, ix (natural) | The remote national park, managed as wilderness, includes the Bungle Bungle Range (pictured), a Devonian plateau that has been heavily eroded into a dramatic landscape of conical sandstone towers. It is one of the largest network of sandstone karst formations in the world. It is important for understanding the weathering processes and the formation of cone karst. The plateau is reaching 250 m (820 ft) above the surrounding savanna grassland. |
| Royal Exhibition Building and Carlton Gardens | Large cream-coloured building with central dome and grand arched entrance, fronted by flowered gardens and a tiered fountain | Victoria | 2004 | 1131bis; ii (cultural) | Constructed to host a world's fair, the Melbourne International Exhibition in 1880, the Royal Exhibition Building (pictured) and the surrounding gardens represent the international exhibition movement of the 19th and early 20th centuries, showcasing technological innovations and development of all nations. The complex was designed by Joseph Reed and also hosted the 1888 Melbourne Centennial Exhibition. These were the two largest international events held in colonial Australia. A minor boundary modification took place in 2010. |
| Sydney Opera House | Beige and white building with seven peaked roofs, sitting on a promontory surrounded by water | New South Wales | 2007 | 166rev; i (cultural) | The Opera House, located at the tip of a peninsula projecting into Sydney Harbour, is a masterpiece of 20th century architecture. Designed by the Danish architect Jørn Utzon and inaugurated in 1973, the building is significant both because of its unparalleled design and technological innovation during construction. The complex comprises three groups of interlocking shell structures, covering two performance halls and a restaurant. |
| Australian Convict Sites | A large white prison building with many windows | New South Wales, Norfolk Island, Tasmania, Western Australia | 2010 | 1306; iv, vi (cultural) | In the 18th and 19th centuries, the British Empire transported around 166,000 men, women, and children to penal colonies in Australia. In addition to punishment and rehabilitation, the convicts were subjected to forced labour to build colonial infrastructure. They also represented a significant source of population of European origin. Simultaneously, this led to the Aboriginal population being pushed into the hinterland. Eleven convict sites across Australia are listed, the Fremantle Prison in Perth is pictured. |
| Ningaloo Coast | Side-on view of a spotted whale shark in cloudy blue water | Western Australia | 2011 | 1369; vii, x (natural) | The coastal waters are home to one of the longest coral reefs that are near the shore. In addition to more than 300 species of corals, there are numerous fish, mollusc, and crustacean species. Every year, hundreds of whale sharks (a specimen pictured) congregate in the area to feed during the periods of increased productivity. The terrestrial component of the site is marked by limestone karst features, in particular caves that support diverse subterranean animal species. |
| Budj Bim Cultural Landscape | Lake with trees growing on the shore | Victoria | 2019 | 1577; iii, v (cultural) | The cultural landscape at the Budj Bim volcano has been shaped by the Gunditjmara over more than six millennia. The lava flows, produced by an eruption, formed basis for one of the oldest examples of aquaculture in the world. People constructed a series of weirs, dams, and channels, to direct the water from the lakes to trap and harvest the short-finned eels (or kooyang) that migrate through the river system annually. |
| Murujuga Cultural Landscape | Landscape with a stream and piles of rocks | Western Australia | 2025 | 1709; i, iii, v (cultural) | The cultural landscape in the Pilbara has been inhabited for around 50,000 years. Through millennia, Aboriginal communities have created one of the densest concentrations of petroglyphs in the world, with more than one million images. They represent human figures, either static or in moving poses, as well as terrestrial and marine fauna, including some of the species now long extinct, such as a fat-tailed kangaroo species. |

== Tentative list ==
In addition to sites inscribed on the World Heritage List, member states can maintain a list of tentative sites that they may consider for nomination. Nominations for the World Heritage List are only accepted if the site was previously listed on the tentative list. Australia maintains nine properties on its tentative list.

* Transnational site

Tentative sites
| Site | Image | Location (state or territory) | Year listed | UNESCO criteria | Description |
|---|---|---|---|---|---|
| Great Sandy World Heritage Area | Coast with a sandy beech and trees | Queensland | 2010 | vii, viii, ix (natural) | This is a proposed extension to the K'gari or Fraser Island (pictured) World Heritage Site, to include sites on the mainland, including the Wide Bay Military Reserve, Great Sandy Strait, Platypus Bay, and the Breaksea Spit. The area features a succession of sandy dunes, with a history spanning over 700,000 years, and is rich in biodiversity. The vegetation includes tropical rainforests, mangroves, and dry shrublands, and there are more than 350 species of birds. |
| The Gondwana Rainforests of Australia World Heritage Area | A path through a rainforest with a bench | New South Wales, Queensland | 2010 | viii, ix, x (natural) | This is a proposed extension to the Gondwana Rainforest World Heritage Site, comprising numerous protected areas with temperate rainforests. The proposed additions include parts of the Dorrigo National Park (pictured), sites along the Manning River and sites in the Tweed Range. |
| Flinders Ranges | Rocks with a bronze marker for the Ediacaran period | South Australia | 2021 | viii (natural) | This site comprises seven properties that illustrate the geological succession of major early stages in the development of animal life. Fossil and geological record spans 350 million years, from the Neoproterozoic (850 Mya) to the Cambrian (500 Mya). The events documented in the rocks include the episodes of the worldwide glaciations (the Snowball Earth), the emergence of barrier reefs created by microorganisms (650 Mya), the Ediacaran period (635-542 Mya, the golden spike pictured) with the Ediacaran biota, the earliest known complex multicellular organisms present in the last 20 million years of this period. The last period documented is the Cambrian with the rapid diversification of animal life, known as the Cambrian explosion. The seven sites are: Arkaroola Protection Area, Vulkathunha-Gammon Ranges National Park, Ikara-Flinders Ranges National Park, Nilpena Ediacara National Park, Maynards Well, Angorichina, and the Ajax Mine Fossil Reef (on Puttapa station) |
| Parramatta Female Factory and Institutions Precinct | A brick building in a park | New South Wales | 2023 | iv, v (cultural) | This nomination highlights the evolution of ideas related to the forced institutionalisation of women. The Parramatta Female Factory was founded in 1821 as possibly the first female prison in the world, to house the convicts sent to Australia. It housed at the time the only female hospital in the country. Following the cessation of the convict transport in 1840, the institution closed in 1848 and was repurposed as a mental hospital (asylum). Other buildings on site are the Female Orphan School (pictured) and the Norma Parker Centre, the first low security women's prison in New South Wales. |
| Workers' Assembly Halls (Australia)* | A large building with words TRADES HALL above entrance | New South Wales, Victoria | 2023 | iii, iv, vi (cultural) | This transnational nomination comprises buildings in Australia, Argentina, and Denmark related to the international democratic labour movement and mass organisation of workers from 1850 onward. They were purpose-built to serve as meeting places and contained several meeting rooms for assemblies, political, and communal events, offices, often kitchens, printing presses, and businesses. Two buildings are nominated in Australia. The Victorian Trades Hall (pictured) in Melbourne was first erected in 1859 and then rebuilt, expanded, and renovated several times. The Broken Hill Trades Hall was completed in 1905. |
| Cultural Landscapes of Cape York Peninsula | Aboriginal paintings on a rocky wall, depicting human figures | Queensland | 2024 | i, v, vi, vii, viii, ix, x (mixed) | This nomination comprises several properties on the Cape York Peninsula. The area is geologically old, with highly weathered soils and exposed layers from the Precambrian to Cenozoic eras. The landscape types include a tropical monsoon savanna, rainforests, grasslands, sandy beaches, mangroves, and offshore coral reefs. The area is exceptionally rich in biodiversity, containing 18.5% of Australia's plants on three percent of land surface. This high biodiversity was influenced by the proximity to New Guinea, with which Australia was connected during the periods of low sea level. The area has been inhabited and shaped by the Aboriginal Australians for tens of thousands of years. There are numerous sites with rock art, an example from Quinkan rock art is pictured. |
| Australian Cornish Mining Sites: Burra and Moonta | Two stone buildings, one partially ruined, with an open-pit mine in the background | South Australia | 2024 | ii, iii, iv (cultural) | This nomination comprises two mining landscapes from the 19th century around the towns of Burra (pictured) and Moonta. Mining technology was based on those from Cornwall and West Devon (see the British World Heritage Site Cornwall and West Devon Mining Landscape) and cultural traditions were brought to Australia as well. Metal mining focused mostly on copper ore and made Australia world's third largest copper producer by the 1850s. On the other hand, mining industries had a negative effect on the Indigenous peoples (traditional owners) of the region. |
| Victorian Goldfields | Panorama of a lake in a forest with a few buildings in the background | Victoria | 2025 | iv, vi (cultural) | The nomination comprises six sites associated with the Victorian gold rush in the second half of the 19th century (Creswick pictured). Discovery of gold triggered mass migrations to the area and transformed the landscape with the construction of mines and supporting infrastructure, as well as growth of the cities. On the other hand, it also resulted in displacements and discrimination against the Indigenous peoples of the area. |

== See also ==
- Tourism in Australia
