= Lake Mackay hare-wallaby =

Conservation status
- Extinct (IUCN 3.1)

Scientific classification
- Kingdom: Animalia
- Phylum: Chordata
- Class: Mammalia
- Infraclass: Marsupialia
- Order: Diprotodontia
- Family: Macropodidae
- Genus: Lagorchestes
- Species: †L. asomatus

Binomial name
- †Lagorchestes asomatus Finlayson, 1943

Extinct species of marsupial

The Lake Mackay hare-wallaby (Lagorchestes asomatus), also known as the central hare-wallaby or kuluwarri, is an extinct species of macropod formerly found in central Australia. Very little is known about it.

== Family ==
The Lake Mackay hare-wallaby belongs to the family Macropodidae, the largest in the order Diprodontia. Along with possums, gliders, potoroos, and kangaroos, the Lake Mackay hare-wallaby belongs to the suborder Phalangerida. The suborder Vombatiformes consist of koalas and wombats. The Lake Mackay hare-wallaby's subfamily, Macropodinae, comprises 61 species from 10 genera. Macropodidae's other suborder, Sthenurinae, may have included about 20 species during the Pleistocene period according to fossil record.

== History ==
The Lake Mackay hare-wallaby is known only from a single animal collected by explorer/geologist Michael Terry in 1932 between Mount Farewell and the northern end of Lake Mackay in the Northern Territory. Only the skull was kept, and this is the only physical evidence scientists have today for the Lake Mackay hare-wallaby's existence; however, there are records of anecdotal evidence given by Aboriginal Australians.

== General description ==
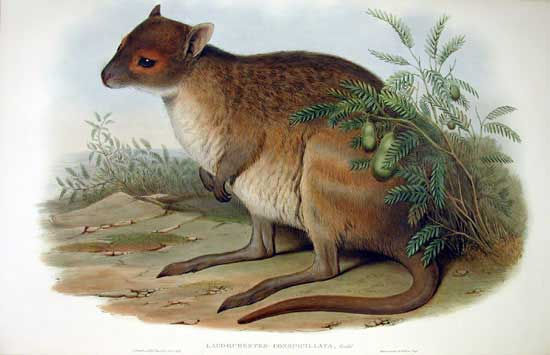
Rendering of the related spectacled hare-wallaby

According to Aboriginal knowledge, the Lake Mackay hare-wallaby was covered in soft, long, grey fur and had especially long fur covering the tops of its feet. It had a short, thick tail and hopped like a kangaroo. The Lake Mackay hare-wallaby was comparable in size to a boodie or rabbit. They were mostly said to only produce one offspring at a time, but a few people reported two.

== Behavior ==
The Lake Mackay hare-wallaby created shelter using Triodia, known commonly as spinifex. They allegedly sheltered in shallow depressions below clumps of spinifex, created grass-lined nests, and sometimes dug short burrows similar to those of the Rufous hare-wallaby. They were referred to as "stupid" and "deaf" by the Aborigines, because when hunted they would not leave their shelter, therefore making them easy prey.

== Diet ==
The Lake Mackay hare-wallaby was said to have eaten grass leaves and seeds and desert quandong fruit.

== Factors leading to extinction ==
Important factors in the decline of hare-wallabies were likely predation by foreign cats and foxes introduced to their habitat. The feral cat is suspected to have been one of the main predatory contributors to the decline of the species. In addition to predators, the introduction of rabbits to central Australia also strained the populations of Lake Mackay hare-wallaby by creating competition over resources such as food and shelter.

The droughts that affected Central Australia in the 1900s were responsible for a surge of forest fires which can also be attributed to the decline of the Lagorchestes asomatus. Human industrial efforts also contributed to the extinction of the Lake Mackay hare-wallaby. Large grass tussocks, which were used by the Lake Mackay hare-wallabies for shelter, were removed for Australia's pastoral industry. As a result, the wallabies became easy prey for eagles, foxes, and cats.

== Location and climate ==
The Lake Mackay hare-wallaby was found in the central and western deserts of Australia up until sometime between the 1940s and 1960s. Oral history states that it was present in the Tanami Desert of the Northern Territory of Australia until the late 1940s and in the Gibson Desert until the early 1960s. Within these deserts, the Lake-Mackay hare-wallaby inhabited sand plains and dunes that contained spinifex. The land in these regions is primarily sandy clay soils filled with salt and halophytic grasses and shrubs. These grasses and shrubs are commonly known as spinifex and mulga. The Lake Mackay hare-wallaby would use the leafy shrubs as coverage for their burrows, especially in hot weather. Not only did the plants help with sheltering them, but they were also a primary food source.

The climate within the Australian desert is mostly dry and arid. Despite this fact, the summer months are dominated by rainfall but the reliability of rainfall is often minimal. The Tanami Desert specifically is described as "a warm dry monsoonal climate and is mostly semi-desert." The average rainfall is roughly 479mm and tends to increase from September to February while decreasing to a minimum in July. Maximum temperatures often occur in December while minimums occur around June and July. Due to the lack of water drought is very common. Increased introduction of exotic herbivores has led to vegetation changes in the area as well.

== Conservation efforts ==
In 2001 there was an effort to reintroduce two species of hare-wallaby, the mala (Lagorchestes hirsutus) and the mernine (Lagostrophus fasciatus). The pressures to their habitats over the past 200 years had caused the two species to become extinct on the mainland. At the time of reintroduction there were only about 250 L. hirsutus in captivity. The project group decided to translocate 34 wallabies into an area, which would give useful information about future reintroductions, in the Shark Bay area of the Peron Peninsula. The wallabies were tracked throughout their exposure in their new habitat, which had the pastoral sheep and cattle removed that would have ruined the studies measurement of habitat selection. The results of the study demonstrated that the variation and flexibility of habitat selections were such that future re-introductions wouldn't have to adhere to very strict areas that have vegetation at a high density. This is positive for future attempts because Australia has experienced a thinning of vegetation due to introduced species
