= Wadderin Sanctuary =

Nature conservation project in Western Australia

Coordinates: 31°58′57″S 118°24′49″E

Wadderin Sanctuary is a nature conservation project within the Shire of Narembeen in the eastern wheatbelt of Western Australia. It is about 290 kilometres (180 mi) east of Perth and 8 kilometres (5.0 mi) north of the town of Narembeen. Wadderin is surrounded by a fox- and cat-proof fence that was completed in early 2008. This has allowed the reintroduction of fauna that is uncommon or locally extinct in the wheatbelt, and includes species that are considered threatened at the national level.

Wadderin is one of very few sanctuary projects within Australia managed by a local community. The community group includes current and retired farmers and townsfolk. Another within Western Australia was the Heirisson Prong project at Useless Loop at Shark Bay. These projects were set up to exclude foxes and feral cats and so allow reconstruction of the past native fauna.

== Description ==
Wadderin is 427 hectares (1,060 acres) in area and consists of a series of large granite outcrops surrounded by woodland, shrubland and mallee. It is largely isolated by surrounding farmland. It is poorly connected to bushland to the east (Wadderin Siding Railway Reserve, 175 hectares (430 acres) and c. 1.4 kilometres (0.87 mi) away) and to the west (Roach Nature Reserve and adjoining bushland, 515 hectares (1,270 acres) and 6 kilometres (3.7 mi) away).

Wadderin is formally a water reserve (#20022) vested for water catchment and supply under the control of the Water Corporation of Western Australia. All granite outcrops have low walls that direct water into channels and eventually into a large holding dam within the Sanctuary. Much of this infrastructure was constructed in the 1920s, yet is still functioning today.

In 2004 a licence agreement was established between the Water Corporation and the Shire of Narembeen (on behalf of a local community group) to manage for nature conservation and potential future eco-tourism. Construction of the barrier fence commenced in 2006 and was completed in early 2008.

Narembeen has an annual average rainfall of 332 millimetres (13.1 in), with the bulk falling from May to September.

== National conservation significance ==
Wadderin Sanctuary is one of seventeen fenced sanctuaries Australia-wide that have been constructed and maintained to preserve wild, self-sustaining populations of threatened mammals. These sanctuaries exclude foxes and feral cats, which are seen as the key factors threatening the ongoing persistence of many Australian species of mammals and ground-nesting birds. Collectively, these sanctuaries preserve some 49 populations of 27 taxa of mammals – with Wadderin making a contribution to the preservation of three species (red-tailed phascogale, woylie, and banded hare-wallaby). These sanctuaries vary in size from 0.5 to 123 square kilometres (0.19 to 47.49 sq mi) in area - with Wadderin slightly larger than the median area of 4.0 square kilometres (1.5 sq mi).

== Fauna ==
The mammal fauna of the reserve prior to the fencing of the Sanctuary and the reintroductions detailed below included only the echidna, western grey kangaroo, and euro and introduced species such as the fox, feral cat, rabbit, house mouse and black rat.

Bruce Leake, a farmer from nearby Kellerberrin, documented the rich past fauna of the eastern wheatbelt in the late 1800s. These included possum, phascogale, tammar wallaby, brush wallaby, rock-wallaby, nailtail wallaby, banded hare-wallaby, rufous hare-wallaby, woylie, boodie, pig-footed bandicoot, dalgite, numbat and chuditch. Many of these species would have occurred in the Narembeen district also. Unfortunately, very little of this fauna remains. It has only been comparatively recently that this loss of fauna has been attributed largely to predation by introduced foxes and feral cats.

Listed in the table below are the eight species that have been reintroduced to Wadderin Sanctuary since 2009. The category gives the status under the Commonwealth EPBC Act 1999.

Common name	Scientific name	Category
Brushtail possum	Trichosurus vulpecula	
Red-tailed phascogale	Phascogale calura	Endangered
Brush-tailed bettong (woylie)	Bettongia penicillata	Endangered
Banded hare-wallaby	Lagostrophus fasciatus	Vulnerable
Western brush wallaby	Macropus irma	
Southern brown bandicoot (quenda)	Isoodon obesulus	
Malleefowl	Leipoa ocellata	Vulnerable
Bush stone-curlew	Burhinus grallarius	

One other reintroduction is planned – that of the black-footed rock-wallaby. This species status is "vulnerable".

The process and outcome of reintroductions of red-tailed phascogale and brushtail possum to Wadderin Sanctuary have been detailed in scientific publications. The red-tailed phascogale now only occurs in the Western Australian wheatbelt and has been subject to concerted conservation effort by farmers to improve its status. Regular monitoring of reintroduced woylies, quenda, and other species at Wadderin Sanctuary is conducted by scientists and community volunteers. Photography of these activities by Vanessa Hunter, The Australian

Fifty three bird species are known from the Sanctuary. Reptiles include rock dragons Ctenophorus ornatus (a fast running diurnal lizard abundant on the granite outcrops), bobtails Tiliqua rugosa, western bearded dragon Pogona minor, and Grey's skink Menetia greyii.

The chocolate spotted frog Heleioporous albopunctatus has been observed in the Sanctuary as have tadpoles of an unidentified species of Neobatrachus.

== Flora ==
At least 241 native plant species have been recorded for the sanctuary. The reserve includes areas of salmon gum, York gum, jam and rock she-oak woodland as well as areas of mallee and shrubland.

Twelve species of orchids were recorded from the reserve in a brief visit by the WA Naturalist Club in September 2003. Students from Narembeen District High School have been involved in projects to do with plant identification and revegetation within the Sanctuary and in adjoining bushland.

== History ==
There are the remains of at least four water wells which pre-date the establishment of the water catchment scheme in the 1920s. Davis (1977, cited in Laing and Hauck 1997) reported that hundreds of small excavated tanks were constructed in the cereal/sheep area as agriculture developed, at least some adjacent to granite outcrops to take advantage of the regular run-off. Farming began in the Narembeen area c. 1900. Another possibility is that they were established and used by the early sandalwood cutters.

Wadderin is the site also for Wadderin Hill School that operated from 1919 to 1936. The school site is marked by a plaque within the Wadderin Sanctuary.
