= 23rd parallel =

23rd parallel may refer to:

- 23rd parallel north, a circle of latitude in the Northern Hemisphere
- 23rd parallel south, a circle of latitude in the Southern Hemisphere
