= 22nd parallel =

22nd parallel may refer to:

- 22nd parallel north, a circle of latitude in the Northern Hemisphere
- 22nd parallel south, a circle of latitude in the Southern Hemisphere
