= Mousesack =

- Mousesack (Polish: Myszowór), a character in The Witcher books by Andrzej Sapkowski
- phascogale, a genus of Australian marsupials
