= 21st parallel =

21st parallel may refer to:

- 21st parallel north, a circle of latitude in the Northern Hemisphere
- 21st parallel south, a circle of latitude in the Southern Hemisphere
