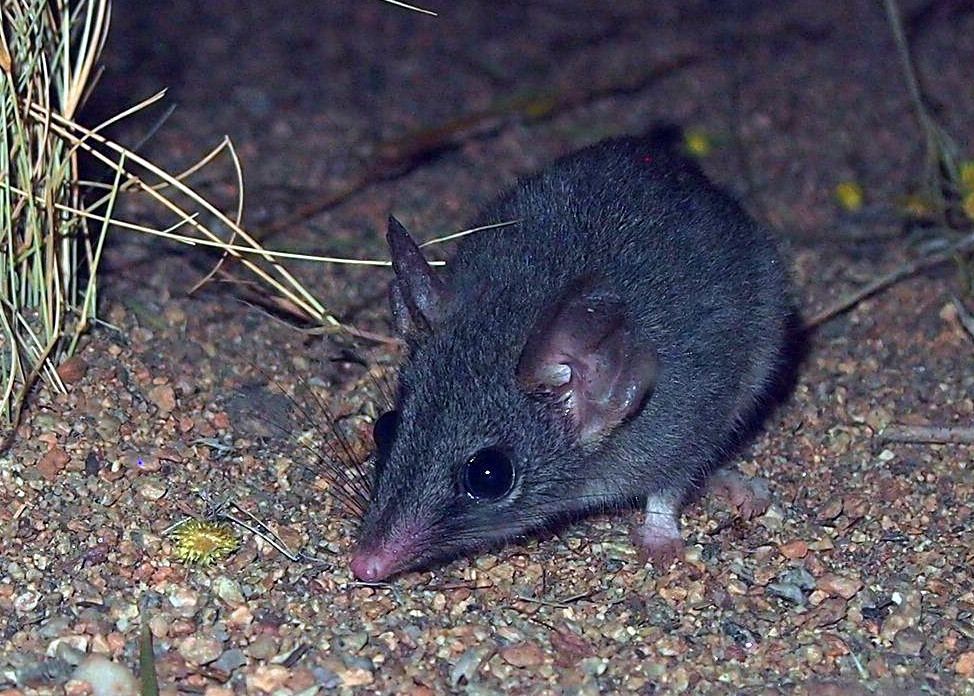

Conservation status
- Near Threatened (IUCN 3.1)

Scientific classification
- Kingdom: Animalia
- Phylum: Chordata
- Class: Mammalia
- Infraclass: Marsupialia
- Order: Dasyuromorphia
- Family: Dasyuridae
- Genus: Phascogale
- Species: P. calura

Binomial name
- Phascogale calura Gould, 1844
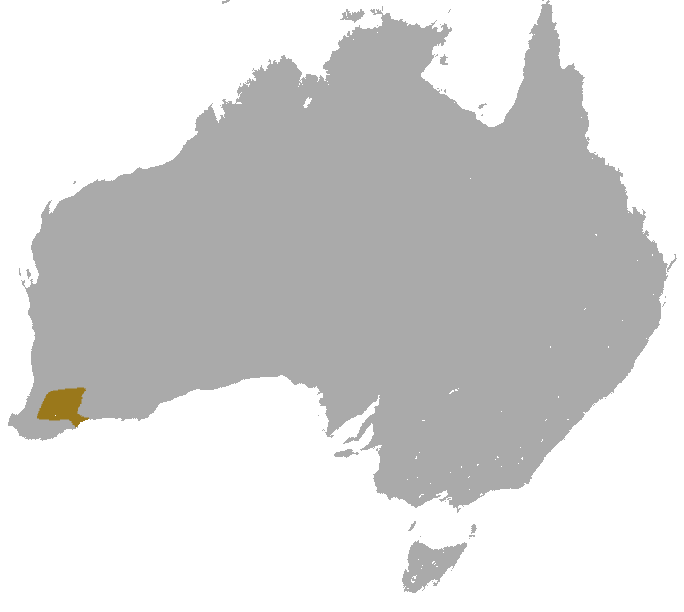
- Red-tailed phascogale range

= Red-tailed phascogale =

Species of mammal

The red-tailed phascogale (Phascogale calura), also known as the red-tailed wambenger, red-tailed mousesack, or kenngoor, is a small, carnivorous marsupial found in inland areas of south-western Western Australia, and has been reintroduced in sanctuaries in WA and the Northern Territory. It is listed as near threatened by the IUCN Red List and vulnerable under the federal EPBC Act, and its status varies between extinct and conservation-dependent under respective legislation in other states and territories of Australia.

It is closely related to the brush-tailed phascogale (Phascogale tapoatafa), but is smaller and browner.

== Taxonomy ==
The red-tailed phascogale or Phascogale calura is one of three members of the Phascogale genus, the others being the brush-tailed phascogale (P. tapoatafa) and the northern brush-tailed phascogale (P. pirata). The species was described in 1844 by ornithologist John Gould. Its scientific name means "beautiful-tailed pouched-weasel".

Alternative names for the species include red-tailed wambenger, kenngoor (in the Nyoongar language), and red-tailed mousesack.

== Description ==
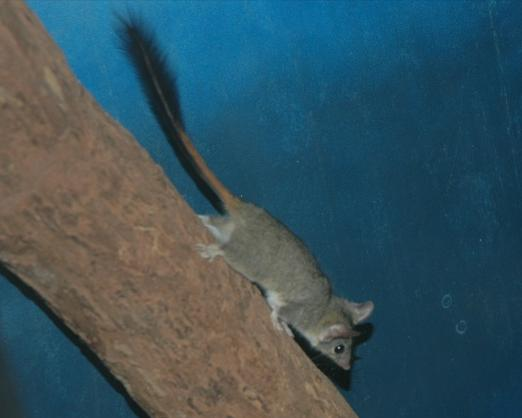
Red-tailed phascogale showing characteristic tail

The red-tailed phascogale is smaller and browner than its close relative, the brush-tailed phascogale. It is around 10 cm (3.9 in) long and weighs about 60 g (2.1 oz).

As in the brush-tailed phascogale, male red-tailed phascogales die following their first mating as a result of stress-related diseases. Males rarely live past 11.5 months, although females can live to three years old. In captivity, males and females can survive up to five years.

The animal can leap up to 2 m (6 ft 7 in).

An arboreal and carnivorous species, the red-tailed phascogale has a varied diet; it can feed on insects and spiders, but also small birds and small mammals, notably the house mouse (Mus musculus), which has become ubiquitous in the landscape since its introduction by Europeans.

The red-tailed phascogale does not drink, as its water is supplied through metabolizing its food.

== Distribution and habitat ==
The red-tailed phascogale was once found across the whole of mainland Australia, and formerly widespread throughout central and western Australia, but it is now restricted to the southern Western Australian wheatbelt.

It is found in dense and tall climax vegetation and appears to prefer those containing the wandoo (Eucalyptus wandoo) and the rock sheoak (Allocasuarina huegeliana), as it has developed a resistance to the fluoroacetate the plants produce that is lethal to livestock. Most native animals have a resistance to this fluoracetate, but introduced species, such as the red fox (Vulpes vulpes), do not, so the red-tailed phascogale's survival in these areas has been suggested to be attributed to this chemical.

== Conservation status ==
The animal is classified as near threatened by the IUCN Red List and vulnerable under the Australian EPBC Act.

As of August 2022, the species' status under the various state and territory legislation is:

- NSW: Listed as extinct (Biodiversity Conservation Act 2016 (NSW): February 2022 list)
- NT: Listed as extinct (Territory Parks and Wildlife Conservation Act 2000: 2012 list)
- SA: Listed as endangered (National Parks and Wildlife Act 1972: January 2020 list)
- VIC: Listed as extinct (Flora and Fauna Guarantee Act 1988: October 2021 list)
- WA: Listed as conservation dependent (Biodiversity Conservation Act 2016 (WA): September 2018 list)

=== Conservation measures ===
The species was reintroduced to the Wadderin Sanctuary in the central wheatbelt of Western Australia in 2009.

Recent conservation efforts in Central Australia have paid off, and 30 were released at the remote Newhaven Wildlife Sanctuary, near Lake Mackay, Northern Territory, in June 2020 after a captive-breeding program at the Alice Springs Desert Park. They were bred from a small group taken from the wild in Western Australia, after their delicate breeding cycle was carefully managed. The animals were microchipped before release and will be tracked for their whole lives.

In a surprise to scientists, a red-tailed phascogale was observed in August 2022 at the Paruna Wildlife Sanctuary run by the Australian Wildlife Conservancy 50 km (31 mi) north-east of Perth, in the Avon Valley. The species had not been seen near this location for several decades, with the closest known population around 100 km (62 mi) away to the south-east.

== Model species ==
The species is used as a model species in research. Studies have been conducted on behavioural thermoregulation and have indicated they bask to reduce their energy demands. Captive nutrition trials found red-tailed phascogales consume up to 39% of their body mass in food per day and their daily maintenance energy requirements are approximately 954 kJ kg^{0.75}day^{−1}. Like many other mammals their food intake during lactation changes to meet the increasing demands of the young.

Most notably, the red-tailed phascogale has been used to study the marsupial immune system, development of their immune tissues, and expression of and localisation of key immune cells. They have an active complement system, like other marsupials, and the expression levels of complement components vary in developing young. The serum of red-tailed phascogales has been shown to have antimicrobial properties against some bacterial species. Reference genes have been evaluated in pouch young and adults.

Red-tailed phascogales also express T-cell receptors and co-receptors, major histocompatibility complex, and interleukin-6 and its receptor.

Given their semelparous reproductive strategy, they have been investigated in terms of their immunosenescense in captivity and immune response.
