= Geographe Channel =

Strait in Australia

Coordinates: 25°00′S 113°25′E

The Geographe Channel is an arm of the Indian Ocean between Bernier Island and Dorre Island (to the west) and the mainland of Western Australia (to the east). It is the northern part of Shark Bay.
