= 24th parallel =

24th parallel may refer to:

- 24th parallel north, a circle of latitude in the Northern Hemisphere
- 24th parallel south, a circle of latitude in the Southern Hemisphere
