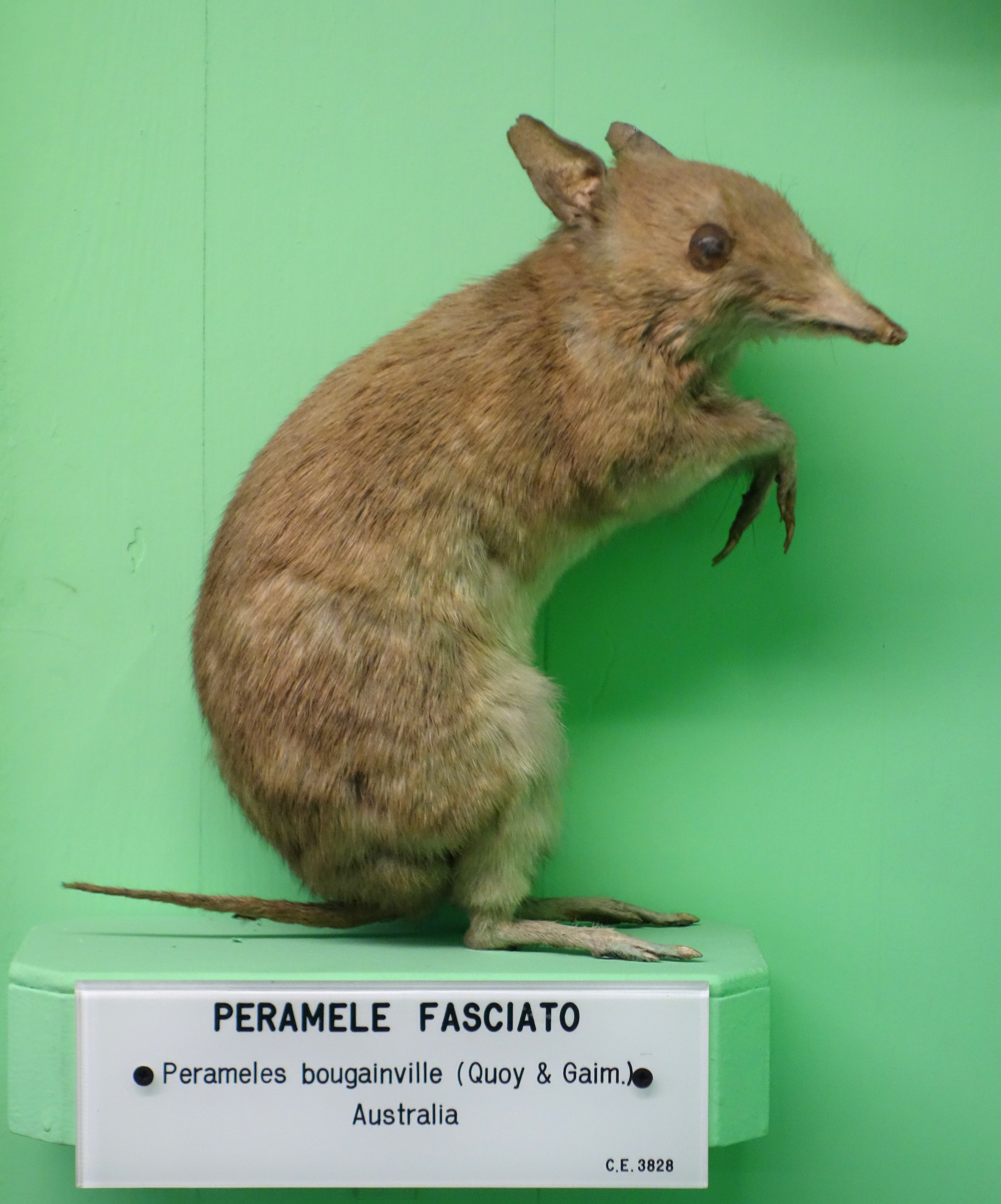

Conservation status
- Vulnerable (IUCN 3.1)
- CITES Appendix I

Scientific classification
- Kingdom: Animalia
- Phylum: Chordata
- Class: Mammalia
- Infraclass: Marsupialia
- Order: Peramelemorphia
- Family: Peramelidae
- Genus: Perameles
- Species: P. bougainville

Binomial name
- Perameles bougainville Quoy & Gaimard, 1824
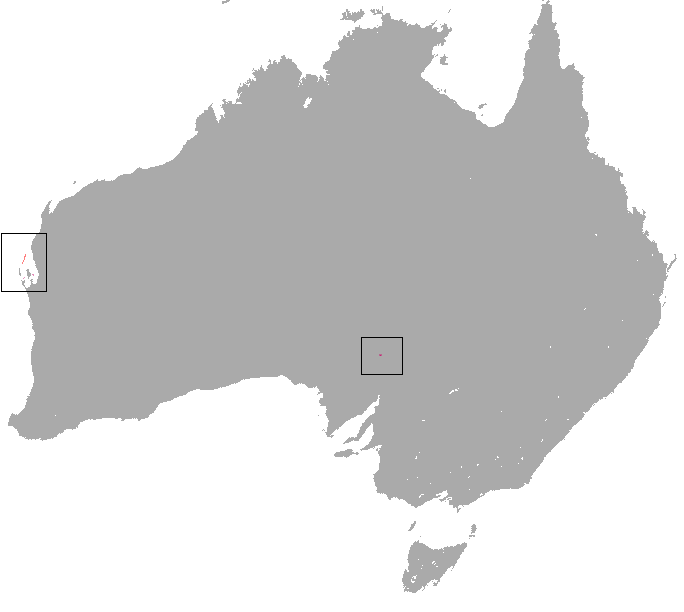
Western barred bandicoot range in 2010
Remnant native range
Reintroduced
(since reintroduced to Dirk Hartog Island and five additional fenced reserves in NSW, SA and WA)

= Western barred bandicoot =

Species of marsupial

The western barred bandicoot (Perameles bougainville), also known as the Shark Bay bandicoot or the marl, is a small species of bandicoot which was once widespread in arid and semi-arid areas of southern Australia. Now extinct across most of its former range, the western barred bandicoot became restricted to Bernier and Dorre islands in the early 20th century. Successful reintroduction programs have taken place since the beginning of the 21st century, and as of 2025, it is resident on four islands in Shark Bay and six fenced reserves on the mainland: one in Western Australia, two in South Australia, and three in New South Wales.

== Description ==
The Western barred bandicoot Is much smaller than its relative the eastern barred bandicoot (Perameles gunnii), and is darker in its colouring, which is a grizzled brown. It measures about 1.5 feet (46 cm) in length. It has two "bars" across its rump and has a short, tapered tail. It was a solitary and crepuscular hunter, eating insects, spiders, and worms and occasionally tubers and roots. When the bandicoot feels threatened, it typically leaps into the air and then burrows to safety.

== Taxonomy ==
The first description of the Western barred bandicoot was from a specimen taken at Peron Peninsula in 1817 by naturalists on the Uranie. Populations of the Perameles species have been referred to by various names, in different regions of Australia;

- P. myosurus myosurus – King George Sound, Western Australia
- P. fasciata – Liverpool Plains, New South Wales
- P. myosuros notina – St Vincent Gulf, South Australia
- P. bougainville – Shark Bay, Western Australia

Since all mainland species are naturally extinct it is believed early taxonomists described the same species based in local populations on pelage colour, however this remains unresolved due to the lack of mainland specimens. In the year 2000 the Environmental Protection and Biodiversity Conservation Act 1999 identified two different taxa, P. bougainville fasciata as extinct, and P. bougainville bougainville as endangered. Today they are all identified under the one species Perameles bougainville.

== Ecology ==
The distribution history shows that the species used a variety of vegetation types as habitats, dependent of its locality on mainland Australia; from Allocasuarina seedlings, open salt bush, blue bush plains, stony ridges bordering scrub and along the Murray-Darling river system. The last natural species habitats are in vegetated beach dune scrub, low heath and hummock grasslands.

Breeding season has been recorded to be triggered from the first considerable rainfall after the summer drought in Autumn. Females reach sexual maturity at 3–5 months and weigh an average of 244 grams (8.6 oz). The female carries between 1–3 young in her pouch, averaging 2 young, with the litter size increasing with a larger mother. Four young have been recorded in pouches in South Australia. The female carries her young between the months of March to November. The male Western barred bandicoot matures at 4–6 months and weighs an average of 195 grams (6.9 oz). The female Western barred bandicoot is larger than the male, being the only recorded species of bandicoot with a larger female.

The Western barred bandicoot is known as a solitary, omnivorous animal, foraging on their own, eating plant matter, invertebrates and skinks. They have an isolated, well-concealed nest made from the litter of their habitat, most often using the same nest each night. Females are known to be the only individuals who share their nests, and only with their young.

== Distribution ==
At the time of European settlement the Western barred bandicoot was widespread across southern mainland Australia from Western Australia to central New South Wales, Victoria and South Australia in arid and semi-arid areas of the Mainland. The last known record of the species occurring on mainland Australia, is in Ooldea, South Australia in 1922 and Rawlinna, Western Australia, in 1929. It was assessed as being extinct on the Australian mainland, Dirk Hartog and Faure islands before reintroduction projects. The only surviving natural populations are on Bernier and Dorre islands in Shark Bay, Western Australia.

The reintroduction program for threatened marsupials saw the Western barred bandicoot reintroduced back to mainland Australia in 1995 to Heirisson Prong, Shark Bay; 66 years after the last known mainland recording. The translocation was ultimately a failure, with the species recently identified as locally extinct on Heirisson Prong.

However the species was successfully reintroduced into the fenced Arid Recovery Reserve at Roxby Downs, South Australia, in 2000, and to Faure island, Shark Bay in 2005. It was reintroduced to a large fenced reserve at Western Australia's Mount Gibson Sanctuary in 2017, to Dirk Hartog Island in October 2019, to a fenced landscape within Sturt National Park in 2021, and to a fenced private reserve on South Australia's Eyre Peninsula in August 2021.

In September 2023, the species was released at two large fenced reserves within New South Wales; in the Pilliga Forest and Mallee Cliffs.

Captive, contained breeding facility populations on the mainland at Dryandra Woodland, in Western Australia were not successful, though there are captive populations within the Barna Mia Nocturnal Animal Sanctuary, allowing people to see the animals in a controlled environment within the Dryandra Woodland.

== Disease ==
In 1999 the Western barred bandicoot was found to have lesions, identified as papillomatosis and carcinomatosis syndrome. It is described as a wart-like syndrome and was first found in captive populations in 1999, wild populations were first observed as being affected in 2001. The disease has been described as an emerging disease and is unlike any skin diseases previously documented on any Australian marsupials. The disease is known to occur only in adult Western barred bandicoots, with the average onset recorded from 3 years and 2 months with lesions increasing in size until they become debilitating. Infected individuals average survival age is 4 years and 6 months, with individuals surviving an average of 1 year and 4.5 months after becoming affected, either through natural death or euthanasia. Today the disease is confined to Bernier Island, and captive populations sourced from Bernier Island. The disease has until recently restricted the translocation of species to only those from Dorre island; however, a 2019 introduction of animals to Dirk Hartog Island included animals from Bernier, which were visually screened for evidence of the disease.

== Predators ==
There are records of predation by the native Gould's monitor (Varanus gouldii) and the western quoll (Dasyurus geoffroii).

Predation from introduced species and human impact are believed to be the biggest causes of species loss since European settlement. Predominately affecting rodents and marsupials weighing between 35 and 5500 grams, up to 49% of the original species of New South Wales have been affected, including the extinction of the Western barred bandicoot from mainland Australia. Feral cats are believed to be primarily responsible for regional extinctions of native mammals before 1857. Foxes have become well established and are also identified as a contributor for the decline and extinction of many Australian mammal species.

Introduced rabbits are not a predator, however they out-compete and modify the vegetation required for food and habitat of the Western barred bandicoot. Rabbit populations also interfere with the litter size of bandicoots; a decrease in rabbit abundance will increase the litter sizes recorded for Western barred bandicoots.

A fence designed to exclude foxes and feral cats was constructed across a narrow neck of Heirisson Prong in 1990, intended to protect a 1200 ha area at the tip of the peninsula from exotic predators. The original population from Dorre Island consisted of 14 individuals. This area was a heavily monitored and managed area and provided a safe refuge area of 17 hectares (42 acres). Numbers fluctuated, with the highest number of 470 individuals recorded in 2006; fluctuations were directly linked to the invasion of foxes and cats within the controlled fenced area. Feral cats were believed primarily responsible for the local extinction of western barred bandicoots on Heirisson Prong in 2008.

== Conservation ==
Conservation efforts for the Western barred bandicoot have been ongoing since 1995, when 14 bandicoots derived from Dorre Island were reintroduced to Heirisson Prong. A fence designed to exclude foxes and feral cats was constructed across a narrow neck of Heirisson Prong in 1990, allowing a 1,200 hectares (3,000 acres) area of the tip of the peninsula to be rid of exotic predators.

Low levels of genetic diversity can indicate vulnerability for conservation of endangered species. Captive breeding recovery programs will have higher success rates with an understanding of genetic data. Diversity losses of genetic drifting due to island bottle necking are likely to counteract the fitness of the species, leaving them vulnerable to diseases, which is already evident.

The few Western barred bandicoot population locations have restricted areas of occupancy, the species is highly susceptible to human activities, climate change, disease and predators, placing pressure on the species survival. These circumstances formulate the vulnerability of becoming critically endangered or extinct in a very short period of time.

=== Conservation listings ===
- International – Vulnerable;
  - The species was previously listed as rare (1982–1990), and endangered (1994–2008). On 16 March 2014 the IUCN updated the listing to Vulnerable D2.
- National – Endangered;
  - The species P.bougainville bougainville from Shark Bay is listed as endangered under the Australian Environment Protection and Biodiversity Conservation Act 1999 from 16 July 2000.
- National – Extinct;
  - The species P.bougainville fasciata, (eastern), Liverpool Plains Striped Bandicoot is listed as extinct under the Australian Environment Protection and Biodiversity Conservation Act 1999 from 16 July 2000.
- Western Australia – Vulnerable;
  - Vulnerable under the Biodiversity Conservation Act 2016 (Wildlife Conservation (Specially Protected Fauna) Notice 2018, schedule 3)
- South Australia – Endangered;
  - National Parks and Wildlife Act 1972—1.7.2015 Schedule 7
- Victoria – Extinct;
  - - Western Barred Bandicoot (eastern subspecies) Perameles bougainville fasciata Flora and Fauna Guarantee Act 1988.
- New South Wales – Extinct;
  - Perameles bougainville fasciata Gray, 1841 Western Barred Bandicoot (mainland) NSW Biodiversity Conservation Act 2016.
