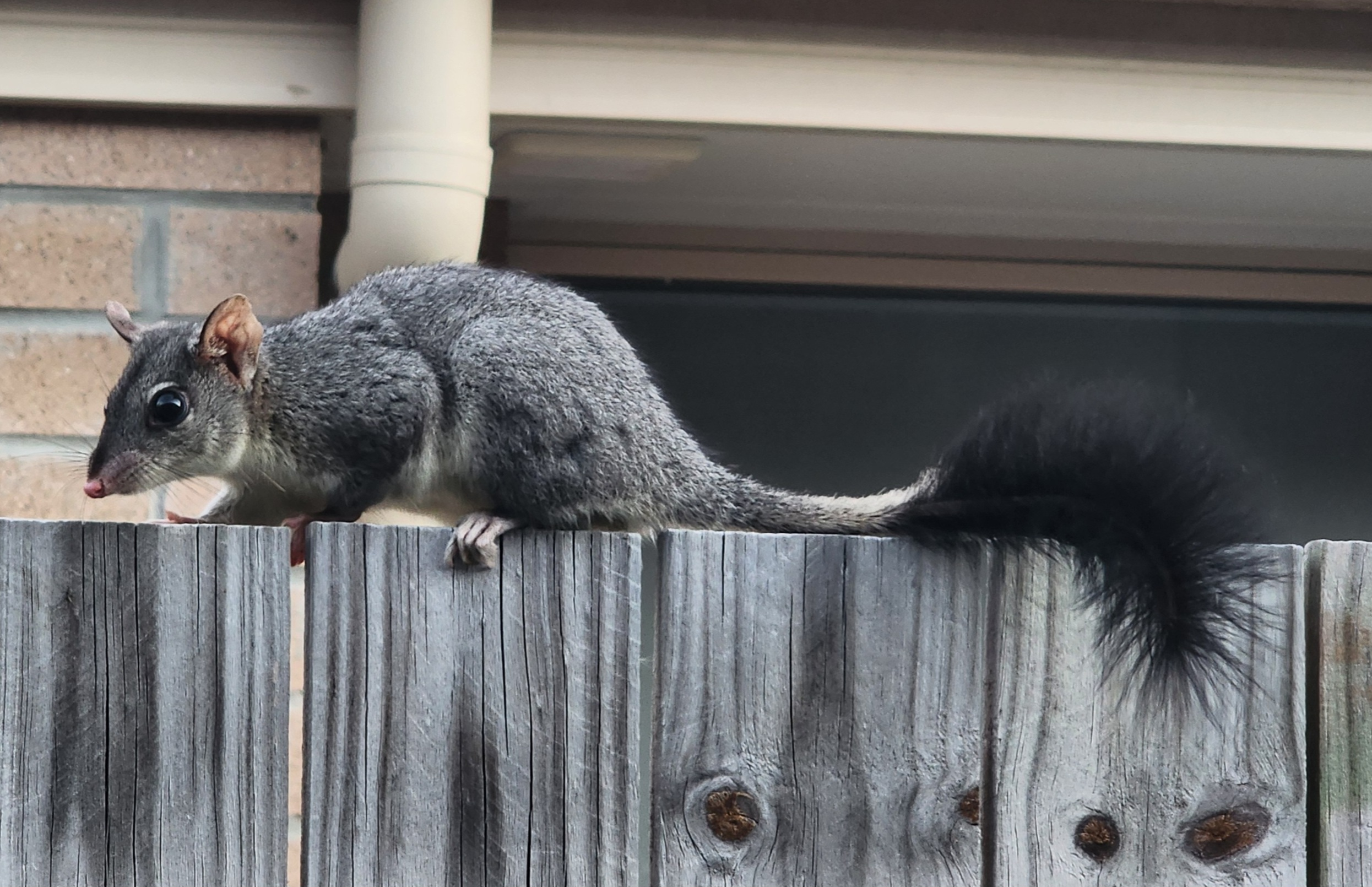

Conservation status
- Near Threatened (IUCN 3.1)

Scientific classification
- Kingdom: Animalia
- Phylum: Chordata
- Class: Mammalia
- Infraclass: Marsupialia
- Order: Dasyuromorphia
- Family: Dasyuridae
- Genus: Phascogale
- Species: P. tapoatafa

Binomial name
- Phascogale tapoatafa (Meyer, 1793)

Subspecies
- P. tapoatafa tapoatafa P. tapoatafa wambenger P. tapoatafa kimberleyensis P. pirata
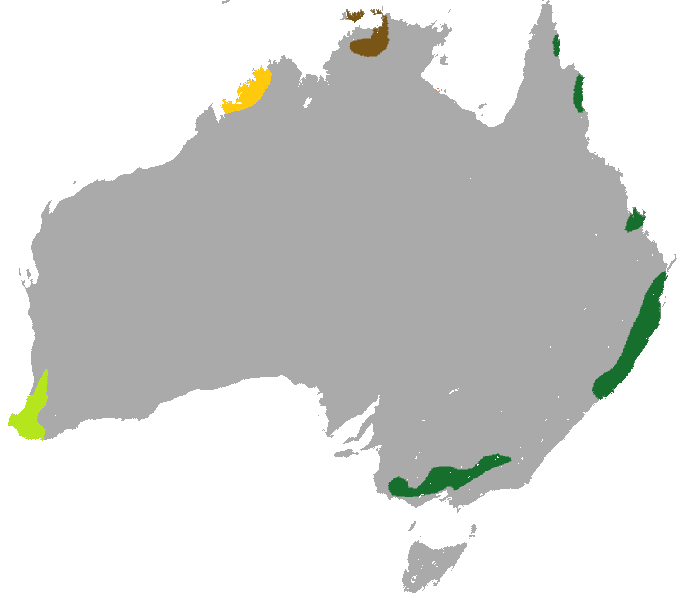

= Brush-tailed phascogale =

Species of mammal

The brush-tailed phascogale (Phascogale tapoatafa), also known by its Australian native name tuan, the common wambenger, the black-tailed mousesack or the black-tailed phascogale, is a rat-sized arboreal carnivorous marsupial of the family Dasyuridae, characterized by a tuft of black silky hairs on the terminal portion of its tail. Males of this species do not live past the age of one, as they die after reproducing.

== Taxonomy ==
The brush-tailed phascogale was first described by Friedrich Meyer in 1793; George Shaw published a revised description in 1800. For some time it was considered a member of the opossum genus Didelphis, but this ended in 1844 when Coenraad Jacob Temminck erected the genus Phascogale. The species is closely related to the red-tailed phascogale (P. calura). Its scientific name, tapoatafa, is a reference to an indigenous Australian name for the species. It has sometimes been known as Phascogale penicillata, referring to its brushed tail. In 2015 three subspecies were identified, and the previous subspecies P. t. pirata was confirmed as a separate species P. pirata:

- P. t. tapoatafa, found in southeast Australia from South Australia to mid-coastal Queensland;
- P. t. wambenger, found in southwest Western Australia;
- P. t. kimberleyensis, found in the Kimberley region of Western Australia.

The subspecies that the population in Cape York Peninsula represents has yet to be identified.

== Description ==
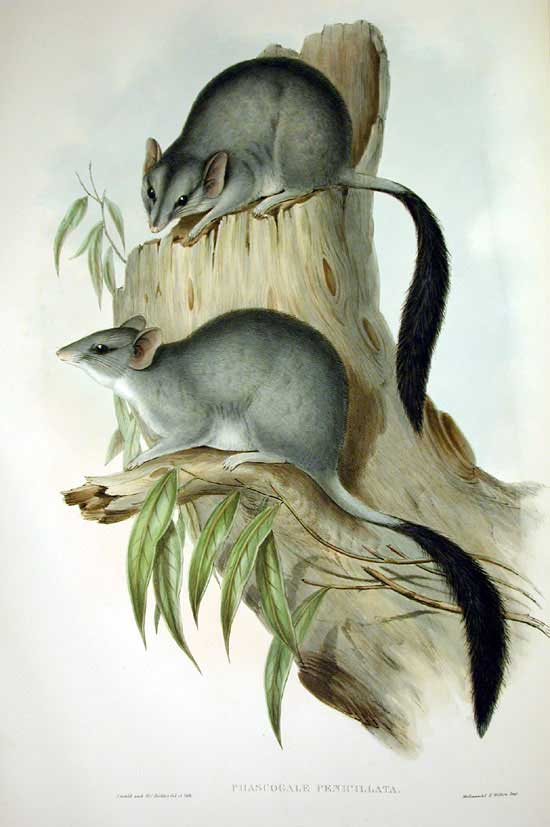
lithograph by Henry Constantine Richter, from The Mammals of Australia by John Gould

This phascogale is grey. Its tail is covered with long black hairs on the lower half that can erect, causing it to appear similar to a bottle brush. Body length is between 16 and 27 cm (6.3 and 10.6 in) with a 16 to 24 cm tail. Males, which can reach up to 310 grams (11 oz), are larger than females, normally weighing less than 210 g.

== Distribution and habitat ==
The brush-tailed phascogale has a widespread but fragmented distribution throughout all states of Australia, excluding Tasmania. As a result of habitat destruction and predation by the red fox and feral cat, they are believed to have disappeared from roughly half of their former range. The species is considered very vulnerable to localised extinction.

It is listed as a vulnerable species on Schedule 2 of the Threatened Species Conservation Act, 1995 (TSC Act, NSW). However the IUCN Red List lists it only as near threatened, and it does not have an EPBC Act status.

== Diet ==
This species is a nocturnal and arboreal hunter. It is an opportunistic generalist that predominantly eats invertebrates, though it also eats smaller mammals, birds, and lizards. It also drinks nectar from flowering trees. Consumption of bird eggs has also been recorded. The species has been reported to attack domestic poultry.

The brush-tailed phascogale is a host of the Acanthocephalan intestinal parasite Australiformis semoni.

== Reproduction ==
Breeding occurs between June and August when the females come into estrus. All male brush-tailed phascogales die before reaching one year of age, generally from stress-related diseases brought about by the energy expended in a bout of frenzied mating. However, some captive males have lived to the age of three, though they were reproductively unviable after the first year. Females nest in hollow trees, bearing litters of 7 to 8 young which stay in the nest to the age of 5 months.
