= Useless Loop, Western Australia =

Town in Shire of Shark Bay, Western Australia

Coordinates: 26°07′50″S 113°25′00″E

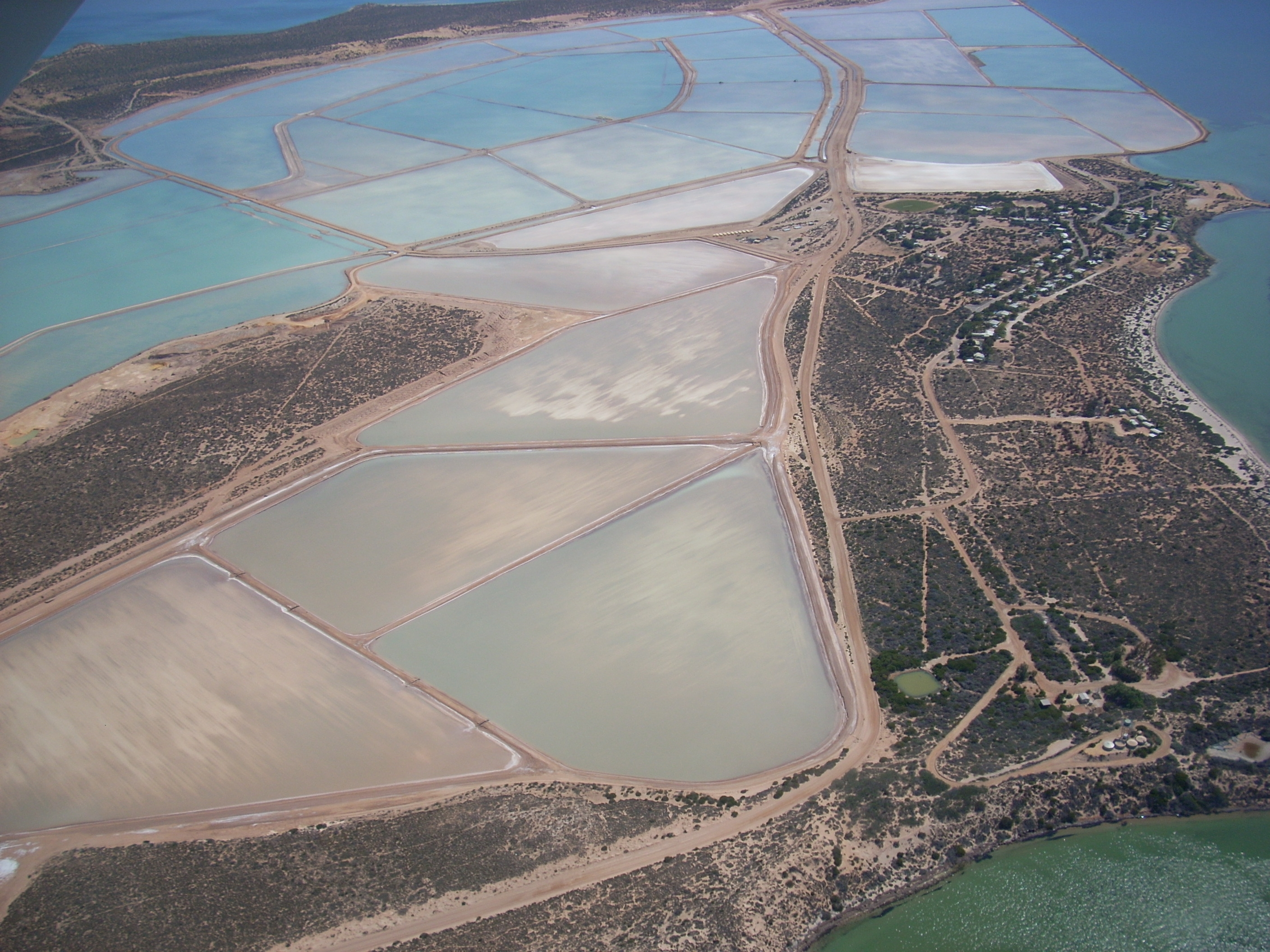
Aerial view of the town's site with salt crystallisation ponds

Useless Loop is a town located on the Heirisson Prong on Denham Sound in Western Australia, in the southern region of Shark Bay, a UNESCO World Heritage Site. The town of Denham is situated about 25 kilometres (16 mi) north-east of Useless Loop across the sound on the opposite shore, and the more famous Monkey Mia is located the same distance again east-northeast of Denham.

Useless Loop is a closed company town, with 70 employees and their families servicing the Solar Salt Operation Shark Bay, established in 1962 by Shark Bay Resources. A joint venture was formed with Mitsui in 1973, which acquired full ownership in 2005, incorporated as Shark Bay Salt. In 2015, Useless Loop exported 1.4 million tonnes (3.1 billion pounds) of salt.

Useless Loop received the 2001 Banksia Award for Community Group Achievement and the 2001 Banksia Gold Award for its initiation of the Heirisson Prong Project in 1989 to protect and relocate the burrowing bettong, western barred bandicoot, and greater stick-nest rat, all endangered Australian mammals.

The first half of Useless Loop's unusual name was bestowed upon it by French explorer Henri-Louis de Saulces de Freycinet, brother of the more famous Louis de Freycinet, during the Baudin expedition to Australia. Henri-Louis dubbed the area Havre Inutile (lit. 'useless haven'), because he believed the inviting harbour to be entirely blocked by a sandbar.
