= Bernier and Dorre Island lock hospitals =

Lock hospital in Shark Bay, Australia

- Shark bay; Bernier and Dorre island seen in the top left.

Geography
- Location: Shark Bay

Administration
- Australia
- State: Western Australia
- Region: Gascoyne

The Bernier and Dorre Island lock hospitals were two lock hospitals (British hospitals for treatment of sexually transmitted diseases) set up on the Bernier and Dorre Islands of Australia from 1908 to 1919 to incarcerate Aboriginal people suspected of having a venereal disease. The conditions inmates were put under were inhumane and deaths were common.

== History ==
From 1908 to 1919, the Western Australian government created lock hospitals on Bernier and Dorre Islands, in order to forcibly incarcerate Aboriginal people suspected of having a venereal disease.

Specifically, Aboriginal people suspected of being infected with syphilis were incarcerated. However it is known that many cases had been misdiagnoses. Aboriginal men were kept on Bernier island and women and children on Dorre.

During the 2019 centenary commemoration, Regional Development Minister Alannah MacTiernan described the Bernier and Dorre lock hospital era as "a really horrific piece of Western Australian history".

== Treatment of inmates ==
The facilities at the lock hospitals were inadequate, inmates had no contact with their families back home, and they underwent experimental medical treatments.

More than 40% would not return to their homelands. It is conservatively estimated that 200 people died on the two islands, with their remains left in unmarked areas. 70% of the deaths were unrelated to the condition for which people were incarcerated; "poor accommodation, inadequate food rations and toxic medical treatments provide [sic] to patients attribute to the death rates." as well as "...general debility, respiratory disease, heart failure and strokes." Many who were released did not return to their homeland as the practice was to release them at "...the nearest mainland port, at Carnarvon, with no provision for return to where they had been collected."

Inmates subsisted on the limited rations acquired from the hospital as well on the local environment. In 1909, rations were halved to 10 pounds (4.5 kg) of flour, 1.5 pounds (0.68 kg) of sugar and 0.25 pounds (0.11 kg) of tea per week. Rations were often delayed when weather did not permit boats from Carnarvon. Stingemore notes that "Even the insane in Australia seem to have received better provisions than the Aboriginal people incarcerated under the Lock Hospital Scheme." The government justified limited rationing under the pretense of allowing Aboriginal people to live 'traditionally'. However, many of the Aboriginal people on the islands had no experience subsisting on a coastal environment.
