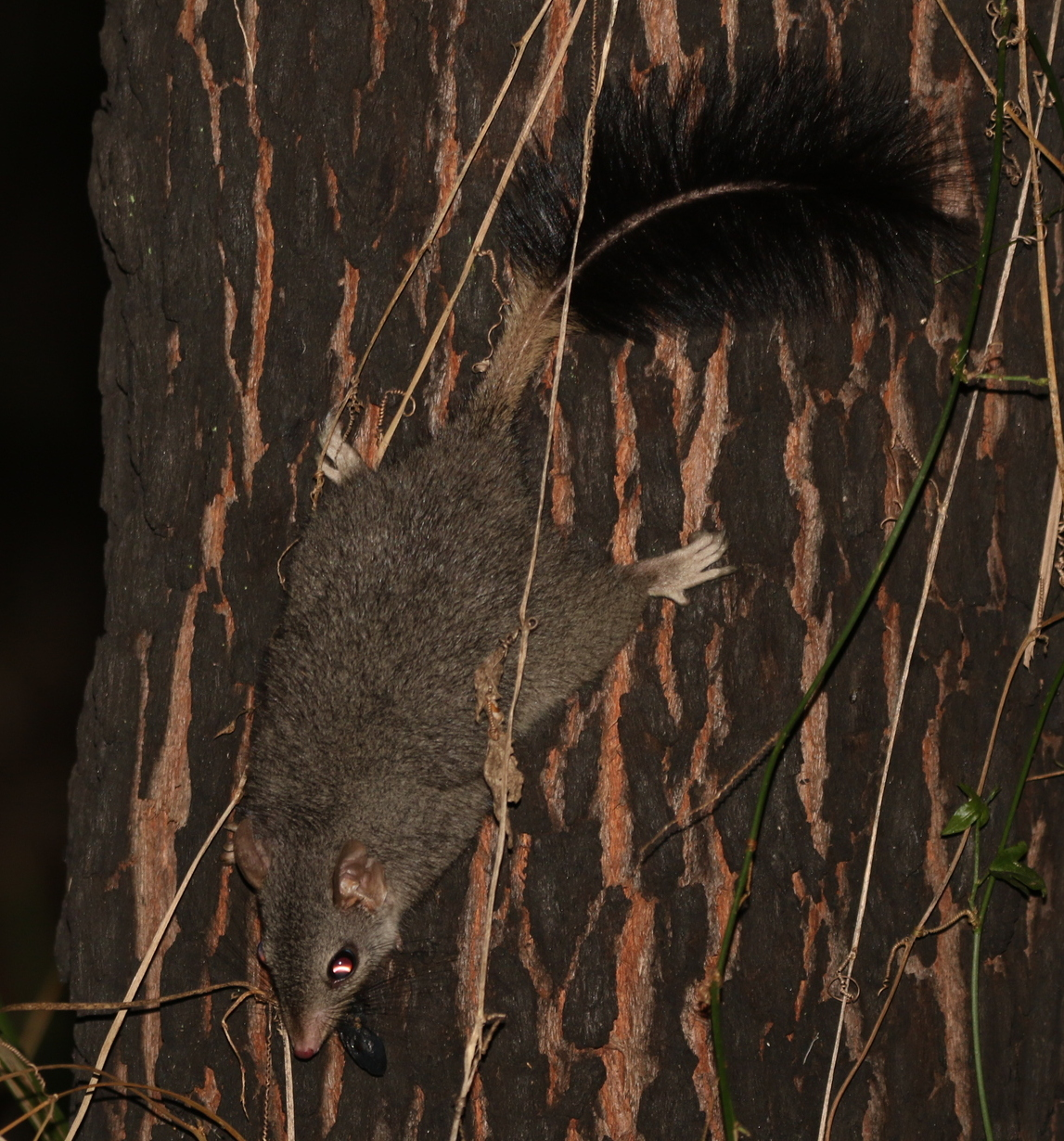
- Brush-tailed phascogale (Phascogale tapoatafa)

Scientific classification
- Domain: Eukaryota
- Kingdom: Animalia
- Phylum: Chordata
- Class: Mammalia
- Infraclass: Marsupialia
- Order: Dasyuromorphia
- Family: Dasyuridae
- Subfamily: Dasyurinae
- Tribe: Phascogalini
- Genus: Phascogale; Temminck, 1824

Type species
- Didelphis penicillata Shaw, 1800 (= Vivera tapoatafa, F. Meyer, 1793

Species
- See text

= Phascogale =

Genus of marsupials

The phascogales (members of the eponymous genus Phascogale), also known as wambengers or mousesacks, are carnivorous Australian marsupials of the family Dasyuridae. There are three species: the brush-tailed phascogale (Phascogale tapoatafa), the red-tailed phascogale (P. calura), and the northern brush-tailed phascogale (P. pirata). As with a number of dasyurid species, the males live for only one year, dying after a period of frenzied mating. The name wambenger comes from the Nyungar language. The term Phascogale was coined in 1824 by Coenraad Jacob Temminck in reference to the brush-tailed phascogale, and means "pouched weasel". All three species are listed as either Near Threatened or Vulnerable by the IUCN.

== Phylogeny ==
The following is a phylogenetic tree based on mitochondrial genome sequences:

- Dasyuromorphia
  - Thylacinus (thylacine)
  - - Myrmecobius (numbat)
    - - Sminthopsis (dunnarts)
      - - Phascogale (wambengers)
        - Dasyurus (quolls)

== Species ==
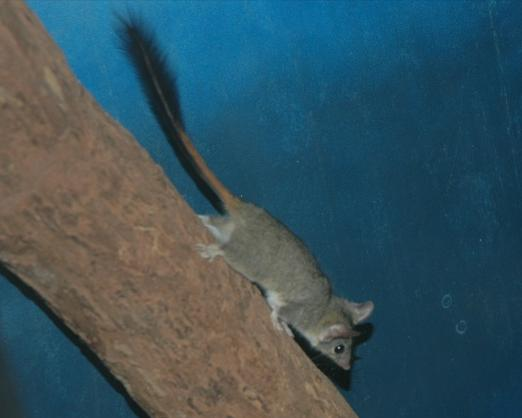
Captive P. calura

The genus consists of the following three species:

Image	Scientific name	Distribution
	Brush-tailed phascogale – Phascogale tapoatafa	southeast Australia from South Australia to mid-coastal Queensland, Western Australia
	Red-tailed phascogale – Phascogale calura	south-western Western Australia
	Northern brush-tailed phascogale – Phascogale pirata	northern Australia.

== Life cycle ==
Mating generally happens between May and July. All males die soon after mating. Females give birth to about 6 young ones about 30 days after mating. Phascogales do not have the true pouch that is found in most other marsupials . Instead, they form temporary folds of skin - sometimes called a "pseudo-pouch" around the mammary glands during pregnancy. Young stay in this pseudo-pouch area, nursing for about 7 weeks before being moved to a nest where they stay until they are weaned at about 20 weeks of age. Females live for about 3 years, and generally produce one litter.
