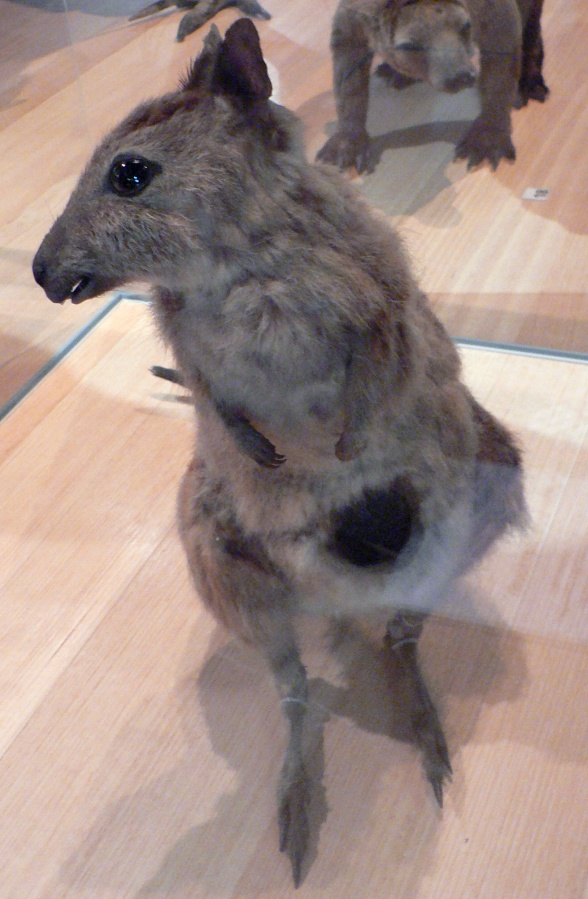
- Eastern hare-wallaby

Scientific classification
- Kingdom: Animalia
- Phylum: Chordata
- Class: Mammalia
- Infraclass: Marsupialia
- Order: Diprotodontia
- Family: Macropodidae
- Subfamily: Macropodinae
- Genus: Lagorchestes; Gould, 1841

Type species
- Macropus leporides Gould, 1841

Species
- †L. asomatus; L. conspicillatus; L. hirsutus; †L. leporides
- Lagorchestes distribution L. conspicillatus in red, L. hirsutus in blue

= Lagorchestes =

Genus of marsupials

Lagorchestes is a genus of small, rabbit-like mammals commonly known as hare-wallabies. It includes four species native to Australia and New Guinea, two of which are extinct. Hare-wallabies belong to the macropod family (Macropodidae) which includes kangaroos, wallabies, and other marsupials.

== Species ==
It has four species, two of which are extinct:

Image	Scientific name	Distribution
	Spectacled hare-wallaby, Lagorchestes conspicillatus	
	Rufous hare-wallaby, Lagorchestes hirsutus	

=== Extinct ===
Image	Scientific name	Distribution
	†Lake Mackay hare-wallaby, Lagorchestes asomatus	
	†Eastern hare-wallaby, Lagorchestes leporides	

The oldest known fossil of Lagorchestes is an 11,000-year-old one of the extant spectacled hare-wallaby.
