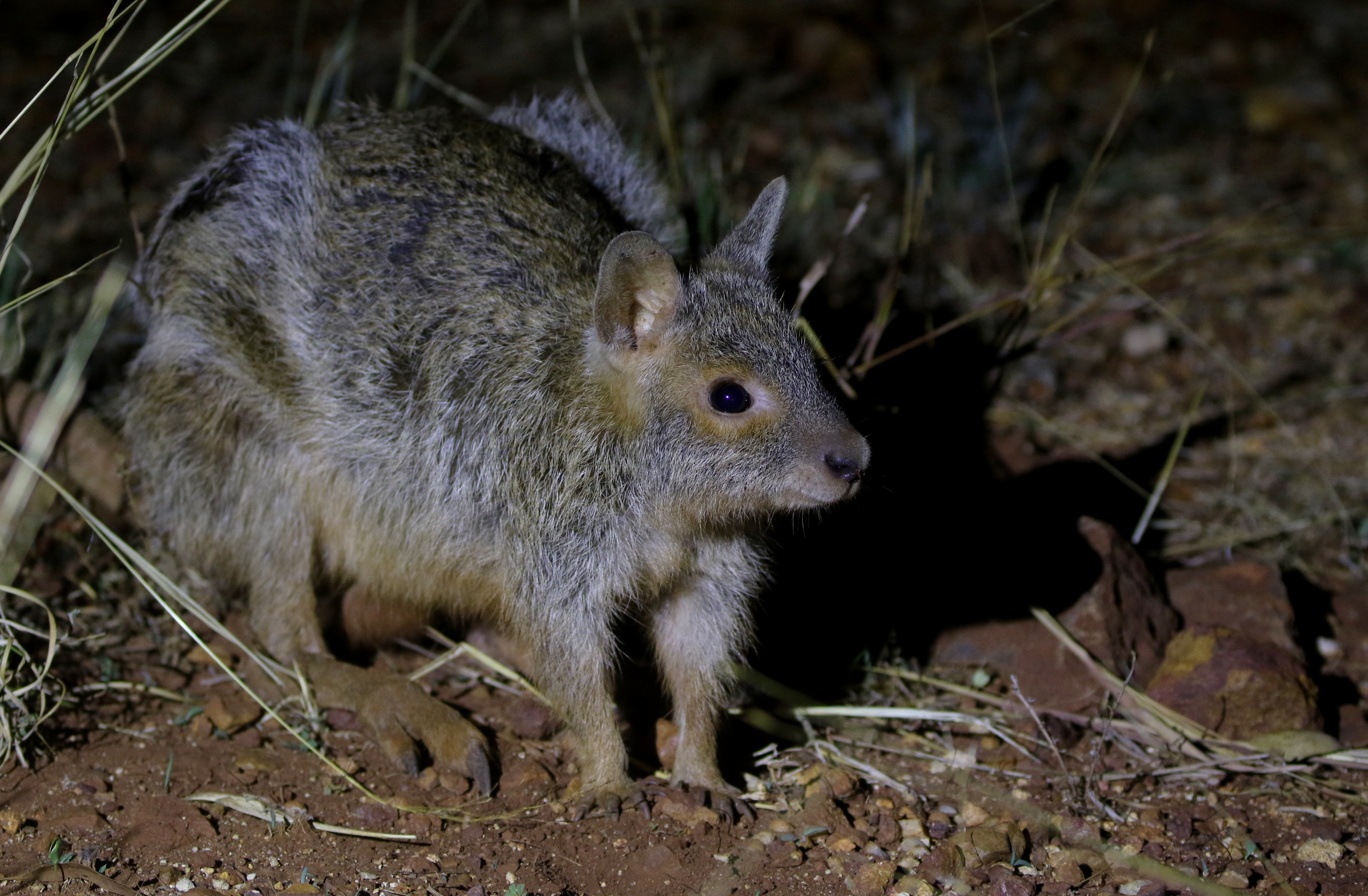

Conservation status
- Least Concern (IUCN 3.1)

Scientific classification
- Kingdom: Animalia
- Phylum: Chordata
- Class: Mammalia
- Infraclass: Marsupialia
- Order: Diprotodontia
- Family: Macropodidae
- Genus: Lagorchestes
- Species: L. conspicillatus

Binomial name
- Lagorchestes conspicillatus Gould, 1842

Subspecies
- Lagorchestes conspicillatus conspicillatus; Lagorchestes conspicillatus leichardti
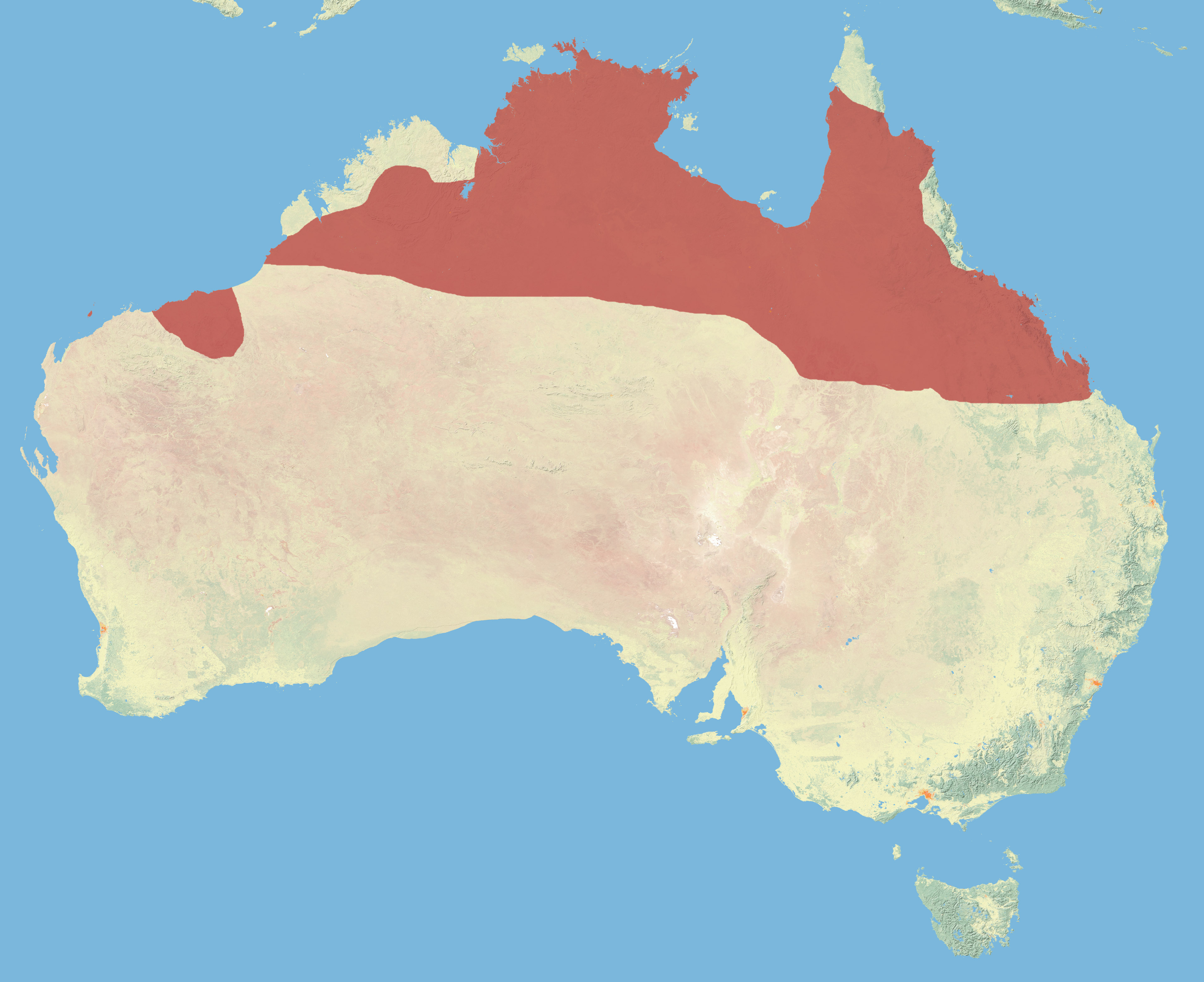
- Spectacled hare-wallaby range

= Spectacled hare-wallaby =

Species of marsupial

The spectacled hare-wallaby (Lagorchestes conspicillatus) is a species of macropod found in Australia and New Guinea. In Australia, a small sub-population is found on Barrow Island, while the mainland type is widespread, though in decline, across northern regions of the country.

== Description ==
A species of Lagorchestes, hare-wallaby are small members of the family Macropodidae. The spectacled hare-wallaby is found across northern Australia in tropical tussock or spinifex habitats. It can be found from Queensland to Western Australia. In 1997, it was discovered in the savanna country of southwest Papua New Guinea, in the upper Bensbach River area. It is a solitary, nocturnal herbivore, and is considerably larger than its relatives. It is coloured grey-brown with golden tips and an orange circle around its eye, from which it gets its name. It builds its nests among the tough vegetation. When disturbed it hops off in a zigzag manner. The young are produced singly at any time of the year and become sexually mature at about a year old.

== Naming and taxonomy ==
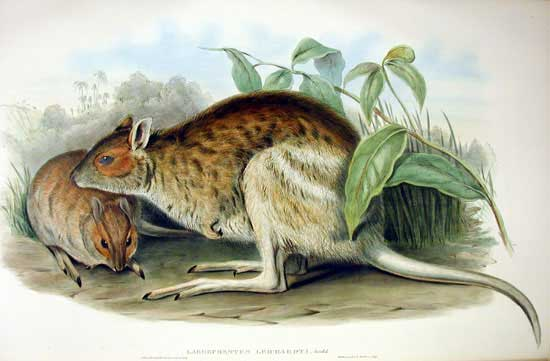
Plate 59 of Mammals of Australia Vol. II

The species was first described by John Gould, naming this hare-wallaby as Lagorchestes conspicillata, and provided an illustration that was included in The Mammals of Australia (Volume II) as plate 59. A separate description, Lagorchestes leichardti, was included in the same work as Pl. 58. This is now regarded as a subpopulation of the same species, which is sometimes described as a subspecies. Lumholtz refers to this animal as a kangaroo-rat, although that term is now the common name for species of a North American rodent genus.

== Threat and status ==
The species was reviewed on the Red List (2008) as having the conservation status least concern. The subspecies L. conspicillatus conspicillatus is restricted to Barrow Island, Western Australia, but was once found throughout the Montebello Islands. Predation by introduced species and development on the island have led to a vulnerable status. L. conspicillatus leichardti, the mainland subspecies, was once regarded as a near-threatened status. The population of the species is in decline, largely due to reduction of habitat through land clearing. Concern also exists regarding the disappearance from arid parts of its far northern range. Reintroduction to former habitats has been proposed, following the related Western Shield projects.

== Fossil record ==
A spectacled hare-wallaby fossil was discovered in Queensland dating up to 11,000 years ago from the early Holocene.

== In Aboriginal language and culture ==
The Bininj people of western Arnhem Land call this animal wularla in the Kunwinjku language.
