= Northern brush-tailed phascogale =

Conservation status
- Vulnerable (IUCN 3.1)

Scientific classification
- Kingdom: Animalia
- Phylum: Chordata
- Class: Mammalia
- Infraclass: Marsupialia
- Order: Dasyuromorphia
- Family: Dasyuridae
- Genus: Phascogale
- Species: P. pirata

Binomial name
- Phascogale pirata Thomas, 1904
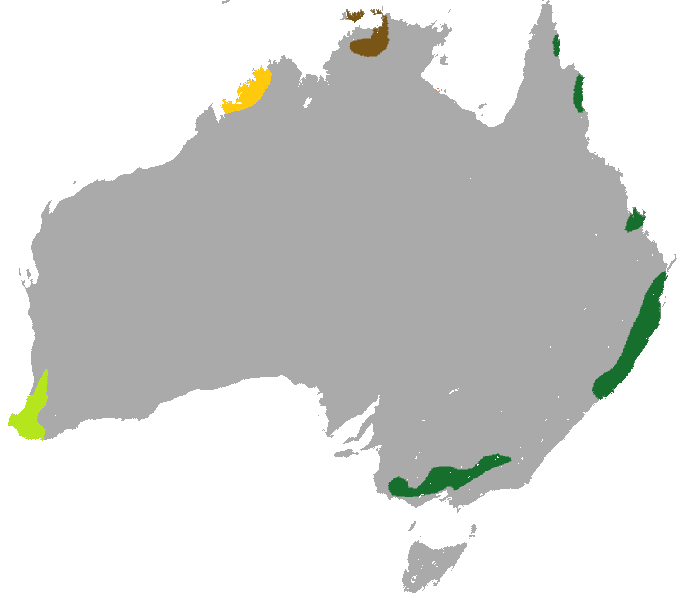
- P. pirata P. tapoatafa kimberleyensis P. tapoatafa wambenger P. tapoatafa tapoatafa

Species of marsupial

The northern brush-tailed phascogale (Phascogale pirata), also known as the northern brush-tailed wambenger or northern brush-tailed mousesack, is a species of marsupial in the family Dasyuridae. It is endemic to northern Australia.
