= Broken Hill Trades Hall =

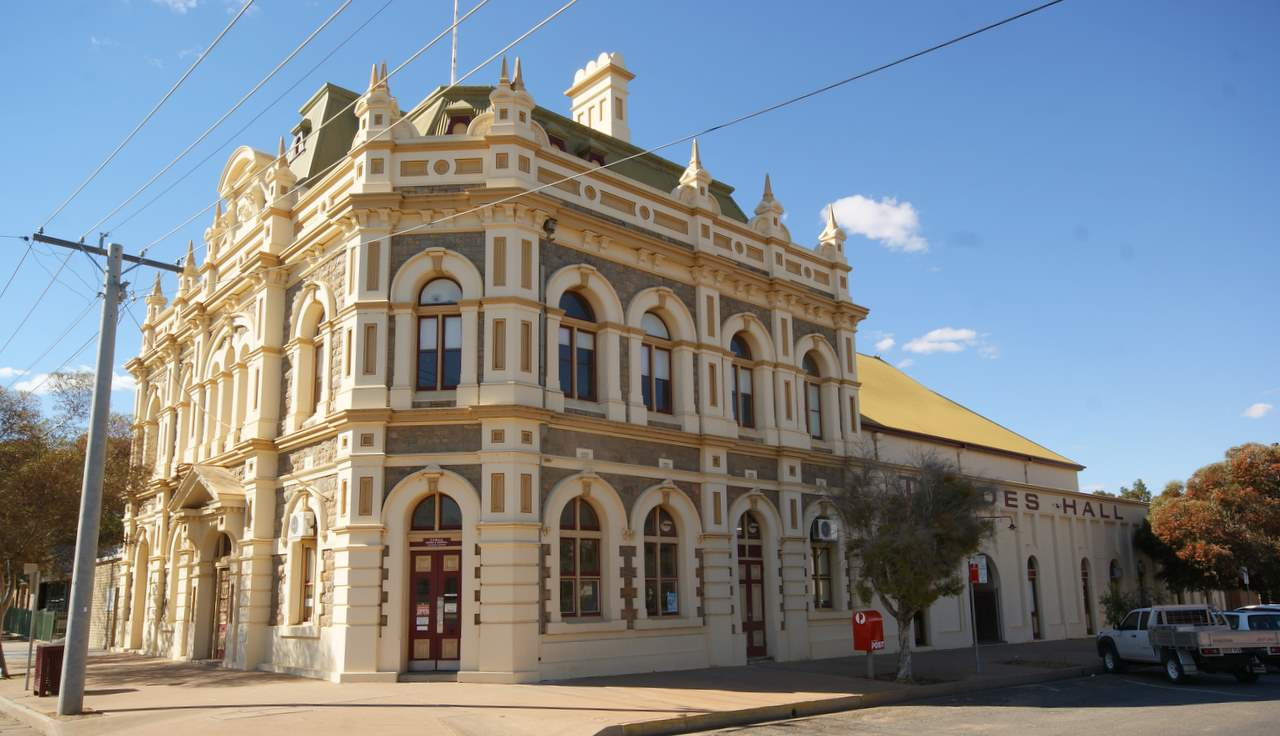

- Location within New South Wales Location within Australia
- 31.9580°S 141.4631°E
- Location: 34 Sulphide Street, Broken Hill, City of Broken Hill, New South Wales, Australia

History
- Built: 1898–1905

Site notes
- Architect: Tom Jackson
- Owner: Trades Hall Trust

New South Wales Heritage Register
- Official name: Trades Hall
- Type: state heritage (built)
- Designated: 2 April 1999
- Reference no.: 181
- Type: Hall Trades
- Category: Community Facilities

The Broken Hill Trades Hall is a heritage-listed trades hall at 34 Sulphide Street, Broken Hill in the Far West of New South Wales, Australia. It was designed by Tom Jackson and built from 1898 to 1905. The property is owned by the Trades Hall Trust. It was added to the New South Wales State Heritage Register on 2 April 1999.

== History ==
The struggle of working people for equitable pay arrangements and safe working conditions is a major theme of the story of Broken Hill. During the 19th and 20th centuries Broken Hill became synonymous with industrial action, union organisation and the cause of socialism. The great industrial disputes of 1892 (1892 Broken Hill miners' strike), 1909 and 1919-20 are well remembered in Broken Hill and beyond. Workers' heroes such as Tom Mann and Percy Brookfield are memorialised in various ways all over the town and the story of Broken Hill's mining unions is closely connected with the story of mining unionism in Australia.

The history of trade unionism in Broken Hill goes back to the early days of mining on the Line of Lode. In September 1884 a public meeting was held at the Adelaide Club Hotel at Silverton to form the Barrier Miners' Association. By 1886 the headquarters of the Association had moved to Broken Hill where it was reconstituted as the Barrier Branch of the Amalgamated Miners" Association. By 1889 the Association, whose programme of reforms included an eight-hour day and compensation for injured workers, had achieved agreement for compulsory union membership.

The economic depression of the 1890s led mining companies to consider the arbitrary imposition of contract labour rates for stoping in the mines. This brought them into direct conflict with the Amalgamated Miners' Association. The Association withdrew labour from the mines in 1892 and mining company efforts to import non-union labour were bitterly resisted. Union leaders Herman Heberle, E. J. Polkinghorne, Robert A. Hewitt, Dick Sleath, W. J. Ferguson and John Bennetts were arrested and gaoled for periods of up to two years. The industrial action was unsuccessful and by 1896 union membership had dropped from approximately 6,000 to 300.

Plans for a Trades Hall had begun in 1890, when Henry Parkes set aside the current site, but after the failure of the 1892 strike, construction did not begin until 1898. Local architect Tom Jackson designed the building and also served as clerk of works during the construction of the first section - comprising the main hall (75 ft x 45 ft), two meeting rooms (one 18 ft x 26 ft and the other 18 ft x 23 ft), and the Amalgamated Miners' Association office. British trade union leader Ben Tillett laid the foundation stone on 5 June 1898. The first section of the Trades Hall opened on 12 January 1899. Jabez Wright served as the first chairman of the Trades Hall Trustees. The balance of the building debt was paid off by 1901, after which time fundraising was dedicated towards completing the hall. Fundraising was also arranged by fellow unions, as described in this article in the Barrier Miner in 1898, when the Secretary of the South Australian Branch of the Australian Workers' Union, Frank Lundie, arranged a tug-of-war competition held in the Crystal Theatre. Jackson's design was again selected for the second section, and he was again appointed clerk of works. The second section would include a large room on the ground floor, the enlargement of the AMA office, a large banqueting room with a dancing floor upstairs, an ante-room for ladies, the Trades Hall secretary's office, and on the third floor a large bandroom. Work on the second section commenced on 25 April 1904. The completed Trades Hall opened in August 1905 to large celebrations.

During the 1890s and early years of the 20th century the Association consolidated its position, establishing its own newspaper The Barrier Daily Truth in 1898 and the Barrier Social Democratic Club in 1903. In 1902 British Socialist and former miner Tom Mann visited Broken Hill. Under the auspices of the Burke Ward Parliamentary Labour League Mann addressed a large crowd from the rotunda of the Hillside Reserve, expounding Marxist ideology and the goals of socialism. Mann so impressed union leaders that in 1908 he was invited by the Combined Unions to return as an organiser to assist in a dispute with BHP.

In that year BHP attempted to reduce wages on the expiration of an existing industrial agreement. In response the unions commenced a recruitment campaign and began agitation for increased wages. Following an agreement on conditions BHP closed its mins and announced that it would re-open 'after the Christmas period with rates reduced by 12.5 percent. The company eventually re-opened with non-union labour. In response the unions picketed the mine and battles with police ensued. The lockout lasted 20 weeks with many miners defecting from the union ranks.

Following World War I the unions, who had recovered from the 1909 strike and consolidated their position, campaigned for a reduction in hours and improved safety. Extended industrial action in 1919-1920 led to the introduction of a 35-hour working week. The Barrier unions continued to campaign aggressively throughout the 20th century for improvements in the working conditions of their members.

The Trades Hall received $60,000 funding, to be matched by the Trades Hall Trust, in April 2017 for major repairs to the building's leaking roof.

In 2018, Broken Hill Trades Hall continues to house the Barrier Industrial Council, the Broken Hill Town Employees' Union, and the Broken Hill office of the Construction, Forestry, Maritime, Mining and Energy Union's mining and energy division.

== Description ==
Built from 1898 to 1905, the Broken Hall Trades Hall is one of the few surviving Victorian buildings in Broken Hill prominently located, and has been little altered externally since it was built. Its chief internal feature is a vast painted ceiling in a geometrical pattern.

It is constructed of stone, rendered, and painted with ornamental encrustations, and has an iron mansard roof. The glass fanlight above the door features roses. There is a main hall at the rear which has a vast ceiling painted in shades of green in a geometrical pattern.

Collection

The Trades Hall Collection consists of a wide variety of artefacts associated with the history of the union movement in Broken Hill and with specific events in that history. It includes collections of union badges, union banners and signs, 2 large AMA flags, documents including picket maps from the 1909 lockout and collections of correspondence, invoices and dockets.

Items in the collection are generally in sound condition although some require conservation interventions and the implementation of more appropriate storage arrangements (13/6/2008).

== Heritage listing ==
Trades Hall was listed on the New South Wales State Heritage Register on 2 April 1999.
