= Heirisson Prong =

Peninsula in Western Australia

Heirisson Prong is a community managed reserve established for the conservation of threatened mammals at Shark Bay in Western Australia. The reserve is at the point of a long narrow peninsula of the same name that juts into Shark Bay from the south.

It was established by a local community group from the small mining community of Useless Loop in 1989 (the Useless Loop Community Biosphere Project Group) on the adjoining pastoral lease. The reserve was modeled on the concept of the biosphere reserve of the UNESCO Man and the Biosphere Programme, whereby a core zone whose primary purpose was nature conservation was surrounded by a zone where the primary function was the sustainable use of natural resources, in this case the farming of solar salt. The outer zone was managed in such a way as not to hinder the conservation objectives of the core, but rather to help protect it.

== History ==
Heirisson Prong was named after sub-lieutenant François-Antoine Heirisson, who was on the French ship Le Naturaliste that visited Shark Bay as part of a scientific expedition led by Nicolas Baudin between 1801 and 1804.

== The Heirisson Prong project ==
The ‘biosphere reserve’ and an adjoining buffer zone became the site for a major research project by CSIRO (a government research body) to understand the reasons for the decline and loss of Australian mammals since European settlement. This project ran from 1990 to 2005. Ongoing assistance in reserve management beyond this time (2005 – 2013) was provided by the consultancy company Wildlife Research and Management Major funding support was provided by the mining company Shark Bay Salt Joint Venture (now Shark Bay Resources), government grants, and the volunteer science organisation Earthwatch.

The Heirisson Prong project was set up at a time when many scientists were sceptical about the role of introduced predators (foxes and feral cats) in the demise of many small ground-dwelling Australian mammals. However, evidence from the successful management of rock-wallabies Petrogale lateralis by controlling foxes in wheatbelt Western Australia and successes and failures of reintroductions of marsupials; pointed strongly to predation from introduced predators as key. Heirisson Prong provided an ideal location to establish a fox-free reserve and to then re-establish endangered mammals. It was in close proximity to islands at Shark Bay where remnant populations of threatened mammals had persisted and its long and narrow shape lent itself to being fenced to exclude foxes and feral cats.

== Excluding exotic predators and reintroducing threatened mammals ==
A fence designed to exclude foxes (and feral cats) was constructed across a narrow neck of Heirisson Prong in 1990, allowing a 1200 ha area of the tip of the peninsula to be rid of exotic predators. The first reintroduction of a threatened marsupial (the burrowing bettong Bettongia lesueur) was made in 1992. Bettongs were sourced from Dorre Island at Shark Bay. Reintroductions of western barred bandicoots Perameles bougainville from Dorre Island; and greater stick nest rats Leporillus conditor from Salutation Island followed in 1995 and 1999 respectively.

Control of foxes by poisoning in a buffer zone south of the fence resulted in a major increase in the densities of feral cats in this zone. A variety of methods were employed to control these cats with mixed results.

The project was plagued by a ‘leaky’ fence that allowed some incursions of foxes and feral cats (in part caused by the difficulty of fencing a > 1 km wide tidal flat on the eastern side of the peninsula) and periodic high rabbit numbers that harmed the native vegetation. Fox incursions were typically short-lived, but often had a major impact on the burrowing bettong population with many killed in a short period of time. Feral cats were believed primarily responsible for the local extinction of western barred bandicoots in 2008. Rabbits on occasions reached very high densities in the relative absence of exotic predators and significantly affected the vegetation, reducing the cover of grasses and defoliating and often killing palatable Acacia shrubs. Rabbits, despite their abundance and similarity in ecology, were not believed to affect burrowing bettongs despite earlier speculation. Rabbits did however have a significant role in reducing cover by defoliating shrubs in drought and facilitating strong winds scouring leaf litter used as nesting shelter by bandicoots from under shrubs.

A variety of native rodent species are present on Heirisson Prong, often peaking in abundance at different times in response to rainfall. Collectively, with rabbits, these provide an abundant and reliable food source for any re-invading feral cats present within the reserve making such cats difficult to control using food-based lures. The abundant presence of threatened mammals such as burrowing bettong contributed to the problem, precluding the use of foot-hold traps and filling all available cage traps.

Burrowing bettongs remained extant on Heirisson Prong in 2013, some 21 years after their reintroduction. Burrowing bettongs from Heirisson Prong were used to establish a new population of this species at a large fenced site in South Australia ('Arid Recovery' at Roxby Downs) in 1999, and burrowing bettongs and western barred bandicoots from Heirisson Prong were used to establish new populations on Faure Island at Shark Bay (in 2002 and 2005 respectively).

Heirisson Prong north of the barrier fence was initially part of a pastoral lease, but in 2008 was returned to the State government. The elimination or proposed elimination of feral cats from some large islands within Shark Bay (Faure Island and Dirk Hartog Island) led to a shift in conservation focus by conservation authorities to conserving mammals at these more secure sites. Support for the Useless Loop community group to maintain the project on Heirisson Prong ceased in mid-2013 leading to an inevitable decline in the effectiveness of the fence.

== Similar projects ==
Another example of community-managed reserve to exclude exotic predators and to allow translocation of threatened mammals and birds is the Wadderin Sanctuary in the wheatbelt of Western Australia. A project with a strong mix of conservation and wildlife science is the Arid Recovery project in outback South Australia. Another peninsula fenced to exclude exotic predators and allow the reintroduction of threatened mammals is the Venus Bay peninsula in South Australia. In all cases, the control of foxes and feral cats allows these projects to conserve a suite of threatened species that would not otherwise persist.
