= Circles of latitude between the 20th parallel south and the 25th parallel south =

Circles of latitude

Following are circles of latitude between the 20th parallel south and the 25th parallel south:

== 21st parallel south ==
21st parallel south (interactive map)

The 21st parallel south is a circle of latitude that is 21 degrees south of the Earth's equatorial plane. It crosses the Atlantic Ocean, Africa, the Indian Ocean, Australasia, the Pacific Ocean and South America.

=== Around the world ===
Starting at the Prime Meridian and heading eastwards, the parallel 21° south passes through:

Coordinates	Country, territory or ocean	Notes
21°00′S 00°00′E	Atlantic Ocean	
21°00′S 13°31′E	Namibia	
21°00′S 21°00′E	Botswana	
21°00′S 27°42′E	Zimbabwe	
21°00′S 32°28′E	Mozambique	
21°00′S 35°06′E	Indian Ocean	Mozambique Channel
21°00′S 43°52′E	Madagascar	
21°00′S 48°27′E	Indian Ocean	
21°00′S 55°15′E	France	Island of Réunion
21°00′S 55°43′E	Indian Ocean	Passing just south of Barrow Island, Western Australia, Australia
21°00′S 116°08′E	Australia	Western Australia; Northern Territory; Queensland
21°00′S 149°06′E	Pacific Ocean	Coral Sea; Passing through Australia's Coral Sea Islands Territory
21°00′S 164°41′E	New Caledonia	
21°00′S 165°24′E	Pacific Ocean	Coral Sea
21°00′S 167°04′E	New Caledonia	Lifou Island
21°00′S 167°22′E	Pacific Ocean	Passing just north of Tongatapu island, Tonga; Passing just north of Rarotonga island, Cook Islands; Passing just south of Anuanuraro atoll, French Polynesia; Passing just north of Anuanurunga atoll, French Polynesia; Passing just north of Nukutepipi atoll, French Polynesia
21°00′S 70°10′W	Chile	
21°00′S 68°22′W	Bolivia	
21°00′S 62°15′W	Paraguay	
21°00′S 57°50′W	Brazil	Mato Grosso do Sul; São Paulo State; Minas Gerais; Rio de Janeiro State; Espírito Santo
21°00′S 40°48′W	Atlantic Ocean	

== 22nd parallel south ==
22nd parallel south (interactive map)

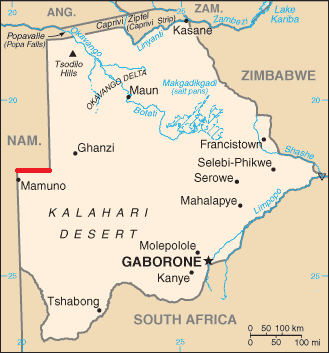
The 22nd parallel south forms part of Botswana's border with Namibia.

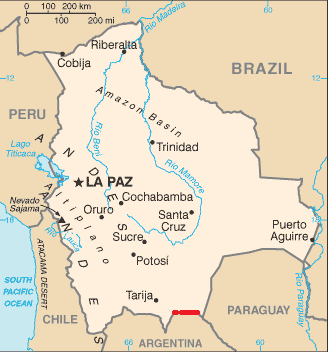
The 22nd parallel south forms part of Bolivia's border with Argentina.

The 22nd parallel south is a circle of latitude that is 22 degrees south of the Earth's equatorial plane. It crosses the Atlantic Ocean, Africa, the Indian Ocean, Australasia, the Pacific Ocean and South America.

A section of the border between Namibia and Botswana, and two sections of the border between Bolivia and Argentina are defined by the parallel.

=== Around the world ===
Starting at the Prime Meridian and heading eastwards, the parallel 22° south passes through:

Coordinates	Country, territory or ocean	Notes
22°00′S 00°00′E	Atlantic Ocean	
22°00′S 14°10′E	Namibia	
22°00′S 20°00′E	Namibia / Botswana border	
22°00′S 21°00′E	Botswana	
22°00′S 29°02′E	Zimbabwe	
22°00′S 31°44′E	Mozambique	
22°00′S 35°19′E	Indian Ocean	Mozambique Channel
22°00′S 43°16′E	Madagascar	
22°00′S 48°05′E	Indian Ocean	
22°00′S 113°56′E	Australia	Western Australia - North West Cape peninsula
22°00′S 114°08′E	Indian Ocean	Exmouth Gulf
22°00′S 114°30′E	Australia	Western Australia; Northern Territory; Queensland
22°00′S 149°29′E	Pacific Ocean	Coral Sea; Passing through Australia's Coral Sea Islands Territory
22°00′S 166°01′E	New Caledonia	
22°00′S 166°45′E	Pacific Ocean	Passing just south of Mangaia, Cook Islands; Passing just south of Îles Maria, French Polynesia; Passing between the atolls of Moruroa and Fangataufa, French Polynesia
22°00′S 136°12′W	French Polynesia	Atoll of Maria Est
22°00′S 136°10′W	Pacific Ocean	
22°00′S 70°11′W	Chile	
22°00′S 68°03′W	Bolivia	
22°00′S 66°17′W	Argentina	
22°00′S 65°52′W	Bolivia	
22°00′S 63°56′W	Bolivia / Argentina border	
22°00′S 63°43′W	Bolivia	For 4.5 km - the border diverts south of the parallel around the town of Yacuíba
22°00′S 63°40′W	Bolivia / Argentina border	
22°00′S 62°48′W	Bolivia	
22°00′S 62°34′W	Paraguay	
22°00′S 57°58′W	Brazil	Mato Grosso do Sul; São Paulo; Minas Gerais; Rio de Janeiro
22°00′S 40°59′W	Atlantic Ocean	

== 23rd parallel south ==
23rd parallel south (interactive map)

The 23rd parallel south is a circle of latitude that is 23 degrees south of the Earth's equatorial plane, about 50 km north of the Tropic of Capricorn. It crosses the Atlantic Ocean, Africa, the Indian Ocean, Australasia, the Pacific Ocean and South America.

=== Around the world ===
Starting at the Prime Meridian and heading eastwards, the parallel 23° south passes through:

Coordinates	Country, territory or ocean	Notes
23°0′S 0°0′E	Atlantic Ocean	
23°0′S 14°24′E	Namibia	Passing just south of Walvis Bay
23°0′S 20°0′E	Botswana	
23°0′S 27°57′E	South Africa	Limpopo
23°0′S 31°30′E	Mozambique	
23°0′S 35°34′E	Indian Ocean	Mozambique Channel
23°0′S 43°29′E	Madagascar	
23°0′S 47°48′E	Indian Ocean	
23°0′S 113°50′E	Australia	Western Australia; Northern Territory; Queensland
23°0′S 150°46′E	Pacific Ocean	Coral Sea; Passing just north of Cato Reef in Australia's Coral Sea Islands Territory
23°0′S 167°17′E	Pacific Ocean	The parallel defines the southern maritime boundary of the Cook Islands, from the 167th meridian west to the 156th meridian west Passing just north of Morane atoll, French Polynesia; Passing just north of Mangareva island, French Polynesia
23°0′S 70°20′W	Chile	
23°0′S 66°58′W	Argentina	
23°0′S 62°0′W	Paraguay	
23°0′S 55°38′W	Brazil	Mato Grosso do Sul; Paraná; São Paulo - passing north of the city of São Paulo; Rio de Janeiro - passing just south of the city of Rio de Janeiro
23°0′S 43°14′W	Atlantic Ocean	Passing just south of the coast of Brazil
23°0′S 42°1′W	Brazil	Rio de Janeiro - Ilha do Cabo Frio
23°0′S 41°58′W	Atlantic Ocean	

== 24th parallel south ==
24th parallel south (interactive map)

The 24th parallel south is a circle of latitude that is 24 degrees south of the Earth's equatorial plane, about 60 km south of the Tropic of Capricorn. It crosses the Atlantic Ocean, Africa, the Indian Ocean, Australasia, the Pacific Ocean and South America.

=== Around the world ===
Starting at the Prime Meridian and heading eastwards, the parallel 24° south passes through:

Coordinates	Country, territory or ocean	Notes
24°0′S 0°0′E	Atlantic Ocean	
24°0′S 14°27′E	Namibia	
24°0′S 20°0′E	Botswana	
24°0′S 26°55′E	South Africa	Limpopo; Mpumalanga - for about 13 km
24°0′S 31°53′E	Mozambique	
24°0′S 35°31′E	Indian Ocean	Mozambique Channel
24°0′S 43°39′E	Madagascar	
24°0′S 47°30′E	Indian Ocean	
24°0′S 113°27′E	Australia	Western Australia; Northern Territory; Queensland
24°0′S 151°41′E	Pacific Ocean	Coral Sea
24°0′S 166°7′E	Pacific Ocean	Passing just south of Raivavae island, French Polynesia; Passing just south of Oeno Island, Pitcairn Islands
24°0′S 70°31′W	Chile	
24°0′S 67°18′W	Argentina	
24°0′S 60°23′W	Paraguay	
24°0′S 55°15′W	Brazil	Mato Grosso do Sul - for about 4 km
24°0′S 55°12′W	Paraguay	
24°0′S 54°22′W	Brazil	Mato Grosso do Sul; Paraná; São Paulo - passing south of the city of São Paulo
24°0′S 46°12′W	Atlantic Ocean	Passing just south of São Sebastião Island, Brazil

== 25th parallel south ==
25th parallel south (interactive map)

The 25th parallel south is a circle of latitude that is 25 degrees south of the Earth's equatorial plane, just south of the Tropic of Capricorn. It crosses the Atlantic Ocean, Africa, the Indian Ocean, Australasia, the Pacific Ocean and South America.

=== Around the world ===
Starting at the Prime Meridian and heading eastwards, the parallel 25° south passes through:

Coordinates	Country, territory or ocean	Notes
25°0′S 0°0′E	Atlantic Ocean	
25°0′S 14°50′E	Namibia	
25°0′S 20°0′E	South Africa	Northern Cape: Northernmost tip in Kalahari
25°0′S 20°20′E	Botswana	
25°0′S 25°50′E	South Africa	North West; Limpopo; Mpumalanga
25°0′S 32°2′E	Mozambique	
25°0′S 34°4′E	Indian Ocean	Mozambique Channel
25°0′S 44°2′E	Madagascar	
25°0′S 47°0′E	Indian Ocean	
25°0′S 113°7′E	Australia	Western Australia - Dorre Island
25°0′S 113°7′E	Indian Ocean	Geographe Channel
25°0′S 113°39′E	Australia	Western Australia; Northern Territory; Queensland
25°0′S 152°30′E	Pacific Ocean	Coral Sea
25°0′S 153°13′E	Australia	Queensland - Fraser Island
25°0′S 153°21′E	Pacific Ocean	Coral Sea
25°0′S 164°55′E	Pacific Ocean	Passing just north of Pitcairn Island
25°0′S 70°28′W	Chile	
25°0′S 68°24′W	Argentina	
25°0′S 58°8′W	Paraguay	
25°0′S 54°27′W	Brazil	Paraná - for about 15 km; passing just north of Curitiba; São Paulo - for about 20 km
25°0′S 47°52′W	Atlantic Ocean	

== See also ==
- Circles of latitude between the 15th parallel south and the 20th parallel south
- Circles of latitude between the 25th parallel south and the 30th parallel south
