= Friedrich Albrecht Anton Meyer =

German physician and naturalist (1768–1795)

- Education: University of Göttingen
- Scientific career
- Fields: zoology

Friedrich Albrecht Anton Meyer (29 June 1768 – 29 November 1795) was a German medical doctor and naturalist.

His academic thesis in Göttingen was Dissertatio inauguralis medico-therapeutica De cortice angusturae.

He wrote, in 1793, Systematisch-summarische Uebersicht der neuesten zoologischen Entdeckungen in Neuholland und Afrika, a work on African fauna, especially primates and birds.

His classification of reptiles, Synopsis reptilium, novam ipsorum sistens generum methodum, nec non Gottingensium huius ordinis animalium enumerationem, was published in 1795.
