= Bernier Island =

Island in Shark Bay in Western Australia

Coordinates: 24°52′S 113°10′E

Geography
- Location: Shark Bay

Administration
- Australia
- State: Western Australia
- Region: Gascoyne

Bernier Island is one of three islands that comprise the Bernier and Dorre Island Nature Reserve in the Shark Bay World Heritage Site in Western Australia. It was named in 1801 after Pierre François Bernier, the astronomer on the Baudin expedition to Australia.

The island and the neighbouring Dorre Island were locations for a lock hospital in the early 1900s.

== Geography ==
It is located at the north-western corner of the World Heritage area, almost due west of Carnarvon, Western Australia. The 2.6-hectare (6-acre) Koks Island is offshore from the lighthouse at its northern end. It is separated from Dorre Island to its south by a 500-metre (1,640 ft) gap with a depth of 4 metres (13 ft).

== Fauna ==
The island is home to one of the few remaining colonies of the Banded Hare-wallaby (Lagostrophus fasciatus) and the endangered species of mouse Pseudomys fieldi, known as djoongari or the Shark Bay mouse, of which there are an estimated 5,000 to 9,000 individuals.

== Use as a lock hospital (1908–1919) ==
In 1908, the Western Australian government created lock hospitals on Bernier and Dorre Islands to forcibly incarcerate Aboriginal people suspected of having venereal disease. Aboriginal men were mainly detained on Bernier; Aboriginal women and children mostly on Dorre.

The facilities at the lock hospitals were inadequate, inmates had no contact with their families back home, and they underwent experimental medical treatments. It is conservatively estimated that 200 people died on the two islands, with their remains left in unmarked areas. During the 2019 centenary commemoration, Regional Development Minister Alannah MacTiernan described the Bernier and Dorre lock hospital era as "a really horrific piece of Western Australian history."

== Memorial ==
In April 2019, the Lock Hospital Tragedy Memorial Don't look at the Islands was installed on the mainland at Carnarvon, near the place where Aboriginal detainees were taken by boat to Bernier and Dorre.

== See also ==
- List of islands in Shark Bay
