= Dorre Island =

Island in Shark Bay, Western Australia

Coordinates: 25°3′22″S 113°6′10″E

Geography
- Location: Shark Bay

Administration
- Australia
- State: Western Australia
- Region: Gascoyne

Dorre Island is one of three islands that make up the Bernier and Dorre Island Nature Reserve in the Shark Bay World Heritage area in Western Australia. The island was named after Peter Dorre, the pilot of a Dutch vessel, the Eendracht, in 1616.

It was, with Bernier Island, a lock hospital location in the early 1900s.

== Geography ==
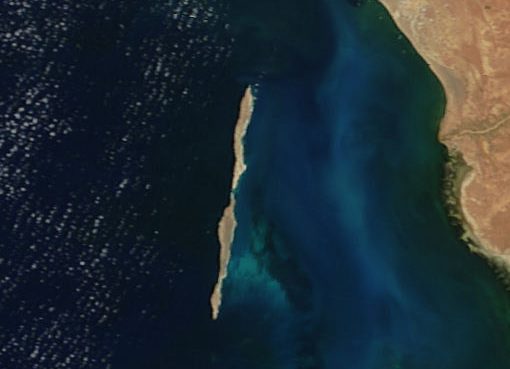
Satellite photo of Dorre Island

It is located at the north-western corner of the World Heritage area, almost due west of Carnarvon, Western Australia. It is separated from Bernier Island to its north by a 500 metres (1,600 ft) gap with a depth of 4 metres (13 ft).

Cape St Cricq is the southernmost point, while Cape Boullanger is the northernmost point of the Island.

Due to its location south of Bernier, and on the northern side of the opening into Shark Bay where Cape Inscription on Dirk Hartog Island lies to the south, some wrecks and remains have been found.

== Fauna ==
The banded hare-wallaby and rufous hare-wallaby are both threatened mammal species that were once found on the mainland but are now both restricted to Dorre and Bernier Island. The rufous hare-wallaby is being reintroduced to mainland Australia.

== See also ==
- List of islands in Shark Bay
