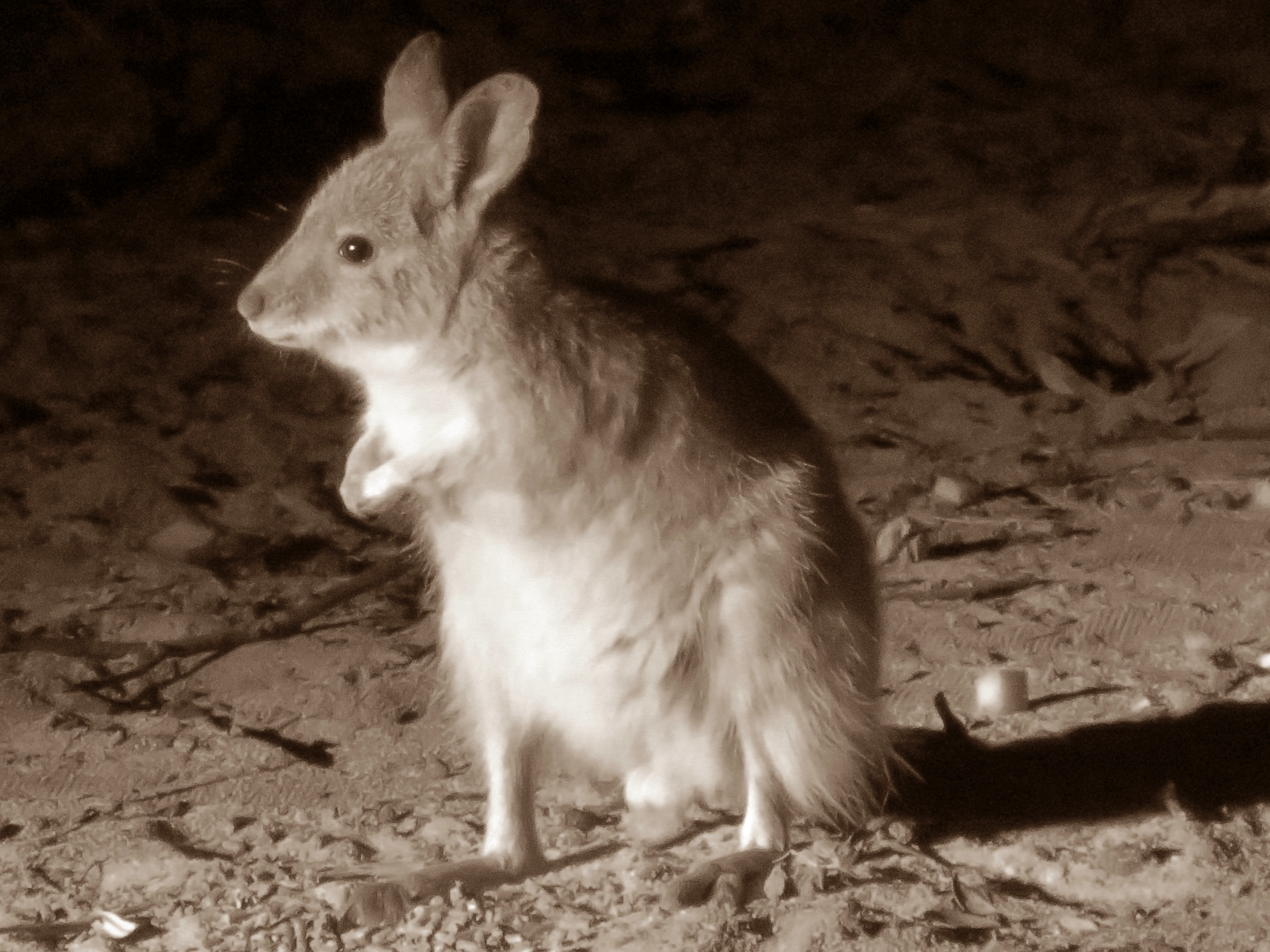

Conservation status
- Near Threatened (IUCN 3.1)
- CITES Appendix I

Scientific classification
- Kingdom: Animalia
- Phylum: Chordata
- Class: Mammalia
- Infraclass: Marsupialia
- Order: Diprotodontia
- Family: Macropodidae
- Genus: Lagorchestes
- Species: L. hirsutus

Binomial name
- Lagorchestes hirsutus Gould, 1844
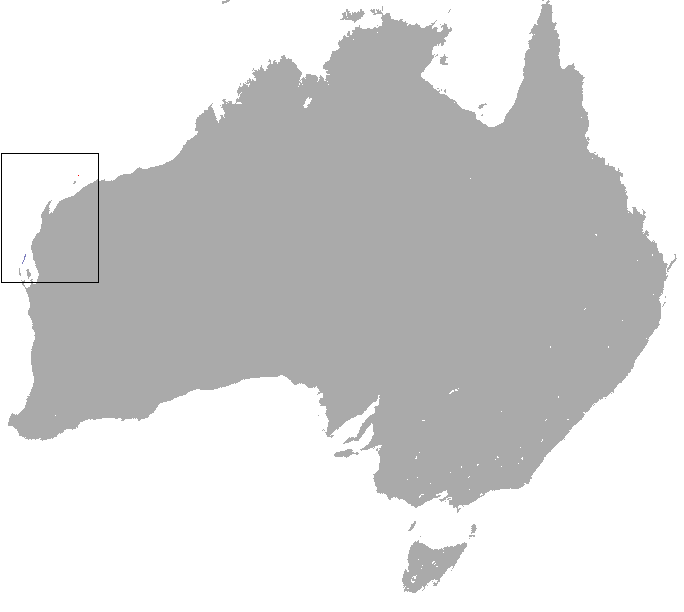
- Rufous hare-wallaby range (blue — native, red — introduced)

= Rufous hare-wallaby =

Species of marsupial

The rufous hare-wallaby (Lagorchestes hirsutus), also known as the mala or wurrup, is a small macropod found in Australia. It was formerly widely distributed across the western half of the continent, but naturally occurring populations are now confined to Bernier Island and Dorre Island off Western Australia.

Although once widespread in the central and western deserts, predation by feral cats and foxes, and destructive wildfires, caused the last wild population on mainland Australia to go extinct in the early 1990s. Despite its extinction in the wild, the mainland subspecies persisted in captivity.

The species, which is currently classified as vulnerable, has rufous-grey fur and is the smallest hare-wallaby, weighing just 800-1,600 grams. It is a solitary nocturnal herbivore that feeds on herbs, leaves and seeds.

Mala prefer spinifex sandplain habitat; the animals build burrows under large spinifex hummocks. The burrows are tunnel-like structures with a spinifex roof. This provides a cool refuge during the heat of the day. In summer, they are likely to dig deeper burrows to withstand searing desert temperatures.

Captive stocks of the mainland subspecies are currently being reintroduced in the Tanami Desert in the Northern Territory. In July 2019, the first reintroductions into the Newhaven Sanctuary were conducted, with the release of 30 individuals into the 9,400 hectare, feral predator-free area.

Animals from both Bernier Island and Dorre Island have recently been translocated to Dirk Hartog Island following the complete removal of livestock and feral cats from the landscape.

== Taxonomy ==
The first European to describe the rufous hare-wallaby was John Gould (1844) in The Mammals of Australia.

Four distinct subpopulations of this species have been described as subspecies, especially with regard to their conservation status. Estimates of these island colonies numbers were between 4,300 and 6,700 in 1994; the environmental conditions cause fluctuations in the total number of animals.

- Lagorchestes hirsutus hirsutus, an extinct group that was restricted to mainland Southwest Australia. This was the type used in the first description of the species by John Gould in 1844, the specimens were collected near York, Western Australia.

Two possible subspecies are found in range restricted to islands near Western Australia.

- Lagorchestes hirsutus bernieri is only found at Bernier Island. This name has priority if not distinct from subspecies:
- Lagorchestes hirsutus dorreae is only found at Dorre Island.

The fourth is an unnamed subspecies that has been conserved by relocation.

- Lagorchestes hirsutus ssp. was originally discovered in the Tanami Desert, and was once widespread across the arid centre of Australia. The only existing members of this group have been translocated to several sites in Western Australia as captive colonies. These are at the Dryandra Woodland, Shark Bay and Trimouille Island. The colony on the latter is estimated to be over 100 individuals. This subspecies has also been reintroduced to the Newhaven Wildlife Sanctuary in the Northern Territory.

== Description ==
A species of Lagorchestes, the smallest of the genus, the combined length of the head and body is 310 to 390 millimetres, greater than the tail length of 245 to 300 mm. Their weight range is 800 to 1,600 grams and body form is comparatively light and delicate. The colouration of the pelage is rufous overall, greyer at the upper back and yellowish at the underside and forearm. Some parts of the population, such as those at the Bernier and Dorre island in Shark Bay, have greyer fur at the underside. The sandy colour of the tail terminates in a grey tip. The fur is long and shaggy in appearance.

== Significance in Anangu (Aboriginal) culture ==
For the Anangu, or Aboriginal people, the Mala or "hare wallaby people" are important ancestral beings. For tens of thousands of years, the Mala have watched over them from rocks and caves and walls, guiding them on their relationships with people, plants and animals, rules for living and caring for country. Mala Tjukurpa, the Mala Law, is central to their living culture and celebrated in story, song, dance and ceremony.
