= Cats in Australia =

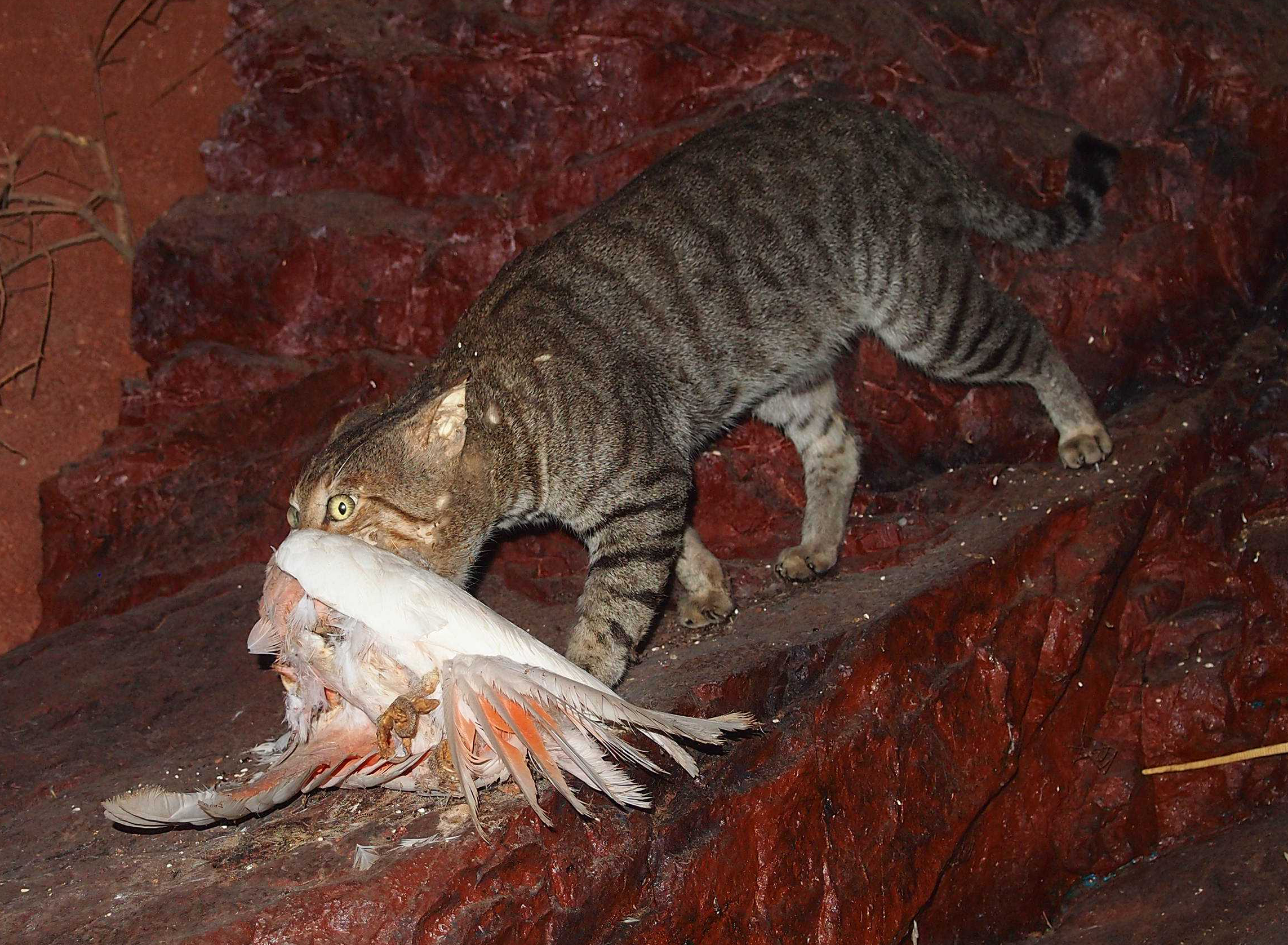
A taxidermy feral cat with a pink cockatoo at the Museum of Central Australia.

Cats (Felis catus), initially introduced into Australia with the First Fleet in 1788, now number more than 11 million distributed across more than 90% of the continent and 92% of the offshore area across more than 100 islands.

Most states in Australia now recognise three categories of cats: domestic, stray, and feral. Domestic cats are the second most popular pet by household (third most populous overall after dogs and fish). In 2023 there were 5.3 million kept as pets of which approximately 95% are neutered. According to a 2017 study, there are around 700,000 stray cats (homeless domesticated cats) in and around urban areas, however this number has surged post COVID-19 pandemic. The same study estimated there to be up to 6.3 million feral cats across the country.

Cats are considered by the CSIRO to be the most damaging invasive pest by cost and fourth most damaging overall to the environment. The Invasive Species Council has estimated that each year domestic and feral cats in Australia kill nearly 1.1 billion mammals, 399 million birds, 609 million reptiles, 93 million frogs, and nearly 1.1 billion invertebrates. Cats are found to have significantly contributed to the extinction of at least 22 endemic Australian mammals since the arrival of Europeans.

Feral cats are extremely difficult to control, are capable of bypassing control barriers and have adapted to harsh desert conditions by burrowing and obtaining sustenance by preying on moisture-rich small desert marsupials. Their economic burden have been more than A$18.7 billion annually since 1960, nine times that of rabbits. Cats carry diseases, such as toxoplasmosis, which impacts humans and livestock at a cost of more than A$6 billion annually. Australia remains rabies free and any cats that are imported into Australia must meet conditions set by the Department of Agriculture, Fisheries and Forestry for biosecurity reasons.

== Historical context ==
Several native species have evolved cat-like characteristics through a process of convergent evolution, including the marsupial quolls, known as a "native cat" which occupied a similar environmental niche to the introduced cat. DNA studies have ruled out any introduction of the mammal Felis catus prior to the arrival of Europeans including Asian introductions or 17th century shipwrecks.

Historical records date the introduction of cats to the First Fleet in 1788. In 1824, Edward Henty brought cats to the Portland Bay district in what is now Victoria. Based on accounts from local Aboriginal people, it is thought that cats were brought to the Swan River Colony (now Perth, Western Australia) from Britain during its 1829 foundation. Most early Australian cats are believed to have been offspring of these introductions. As a result, cats as household pets were rare until the 1830s when they began to grow in popularity, particularly due to their ability to control rodents in rapidly growing urban areas.

The first feral cats were recorded in Sydney in 1824 and in Western Australia in the 1840s.

=== 1860s - Agricultural introductions for rodent and rabbit control ===
With a growing agricultural industry, in the 1860s cats were deliberately introduced into agricultural areas outside of the main settlements. In 1864 a mass release of cats in the Lachlan River in New South Wales was aimed at controlling a rat plague. Similar introductions to control rodent plagues occurred in rural areas of Western Australia and Victoria in the 1860s, and the Warrego River in Queensland in 1874. Cats were seen as particularly effective at controlling occurrences of the bush rat or dusky field rat in farming land.

By the mid-1860s, cats were themselves at times considered a pest. At Barwon Park, Victoria in 1868, one of the first recorded cullings occurred, with over 100 feral cats found to be nesting in rabbit burrows.

Promoted under government policy as a rabbit control, cats were first released in the 1880s in Victoria's Wimmera, as well as in outback South Australia.

=== 1880s - Population explosion ===
Owner of a cat at a bush humpy outside in New South Wales in 1887

While their ability to catch rabbits was often praised, rabbit trapping was considered a far more effective method and the releases simply aided the cat's spread across outback Australia. Observers in far outback Queensland and New South Wales noted that cat populations had begun to grow in number during the 1880s. The first recorded "plague" of wild cats occurred in Thargomindah in 1888 after which local farmers began to place a bounty on them.

By 1890 cats had spread to their approximate current mainland distribution of over 90%. Feral populations were growing in remote Western Australia and Victoria in the late 1890s. Despite this, they continued to be released throughout remote areas of Australia in an effort to control rabbits. For many decades the problem of feral cats was often overlooked as for many it was sight unseen, with cats most actively hunting at night.

=== 20th century onward ===
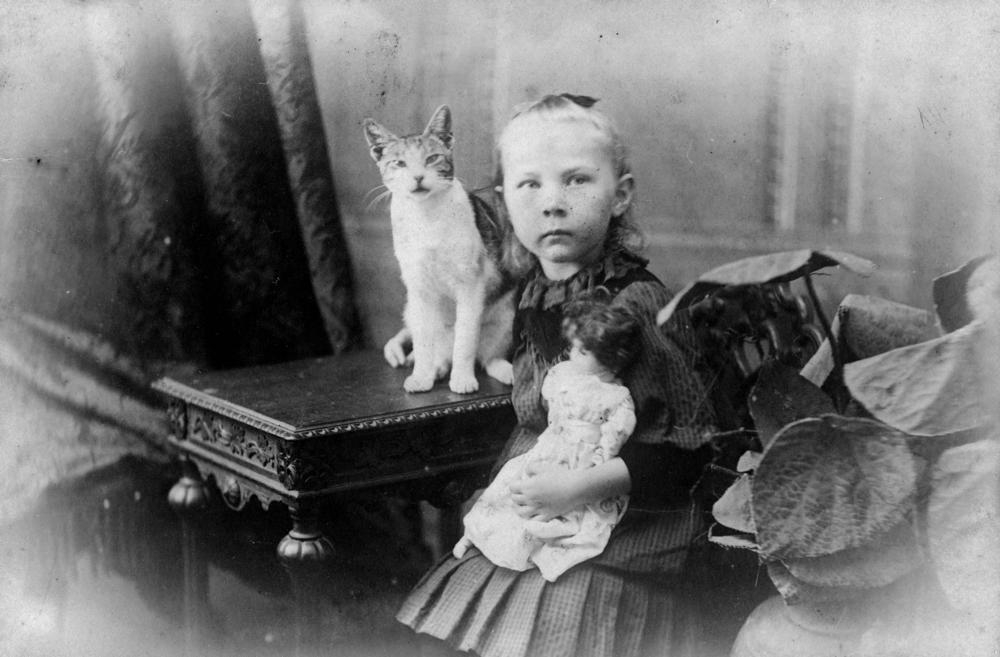
Domestic cat in Mt Morgan, Queensland 1925.

In the early 1900s concern was expressed at the pervasiveness of the cat problem.

The 1920s saw a change of opinion and some began to regard the introduction of cats for pest control as a failure and proclaimed them a pest. The Naturalist, writing for the Australian, was of this sentiment. Professor Wood Jones attributed the threat of bird and marsupial life in the outback to the practice of dumping kittens in rabbit warrens in outback cattle runs. British naturalist Dr Leach in 1923 wrote of a startling decline in Australian birdlife, particularly parrots and concluded that feral cats have "got to be reckoned with". Feral cats were also, by this time, present on most islands. The Royal Society of South Australia met to discuss the issue in 1927. A war was declared on cats in 1929 were common in rabbit burrows, grew far larger than domestic cats, and began to be hunted for their skins.

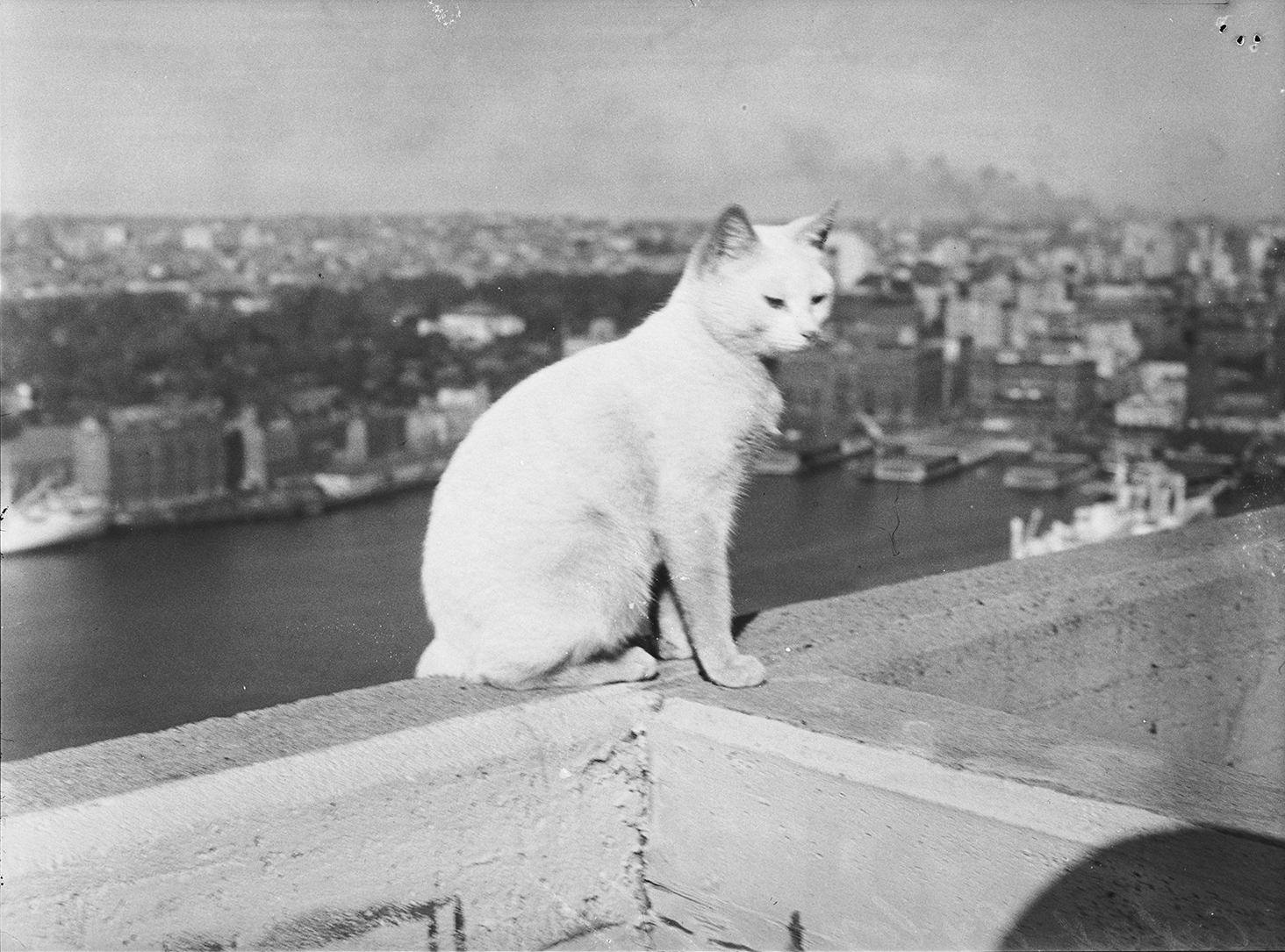
White cat on South-East Pylon, Sydney Harbour Bridge, June 1951

During the 1950s, Myxomatosis was introduced in an effort to control rabbits. This had the effect of cats searching for other sources of food.

During the 1950s and 1960s the Sydney Harbour Bridge south eastern pylon was home to a family of world-famous white cats.

In the 1970s the belief that pet owners were responsible for the feral cat problem became common. This was partly due to an increase in the prevalence of feral cats in urban areas, many believed to be strays. It was also because the RSPCA placed the blame on those disposing of unwanted kittens in the bush and called for pet ownership restrictions. Popular opinion was that most feral cats originated as unwanted or uncontrolled house cats. Cats became a particularly bad problem for on King Island to pheasant populations where groups were lobbying authorities to introduce bounties. Cats up to a metre long were shot in Western Australia.

Prior to the late 1970s opinions as to whether the red fox or cat was the bigger pest tended toward the fox. However, in the late 1970s and early 1980s local extinctions of marsupials began to be attributed directly to feral cats. Cats were the bigger pest, according to experts in the early 1980s, especially to endangered birdlife. Cat eradication programs began to be called for.

A feral cat eradication organisation was formed in 1991.

== Domesticated cats ==
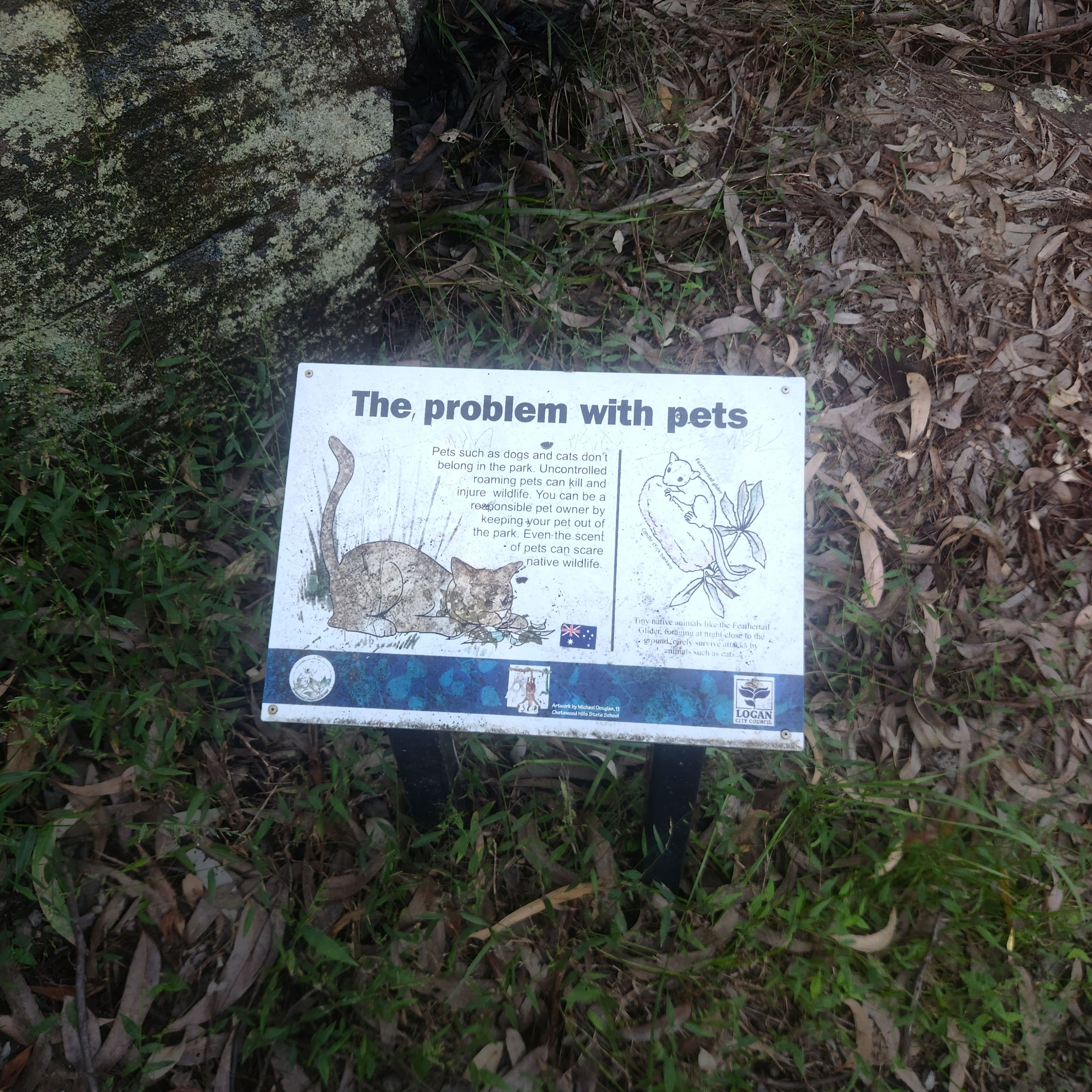
Sign in Springwood Conservation Park Australia - "The problem with pets" - warns about the impact caused by domestic cats on small native species such as the feathertail glider.

In 2023, there were 5.3 million pet cats of which approximately 95% are neutered. The 2023 national survey reports 2.2 million pet cats were securely contained full time indoors.

Domesticated cats that are allowed to roam kill an estimated 110 native animals per cat each year; totalling up to about 80 million native birds, 67 million native mammals and 83 million native reptiles annually.

Almost 30% of Australian households keep at least one domesticated cat. Domesticated cats must be microchipped in every state of Australia except mainland Tasmania. All pet cats past six months of age must be desexed in the Australian Capital Territory, Tasmania, South Australia and Western Australia. There is no limit to how many cats per household in New South Wales. In Tasmania, up to 4 are allowed. Most other states allow up to 2 or 3 cats per household though local laws vary.

In most mainland states and territories, local laws are transitioning toward containment to property, especially at night, to prevent free roaming cats. The Australian Capital Territory introduced strict laws in 2022 including heavy fines for cats not on a property. Western Australia has introduced similar legislation in 2026 with the Cat Amendment (Local Laws) Act 2026. South Australia has introduced night curfews and full containment in sensitive areas. In other states, individual councils have introduced local laws including night curfews. In Tasmania, the Cat Management Act 2009, still allows cats to roam free.

Some islands with active feral cat eradication programs, such as Kangaroo Island, are phasing out domestic cats with the aim of becoming completely cat free.

== Feral cats ==
=== Ecological impacts ===
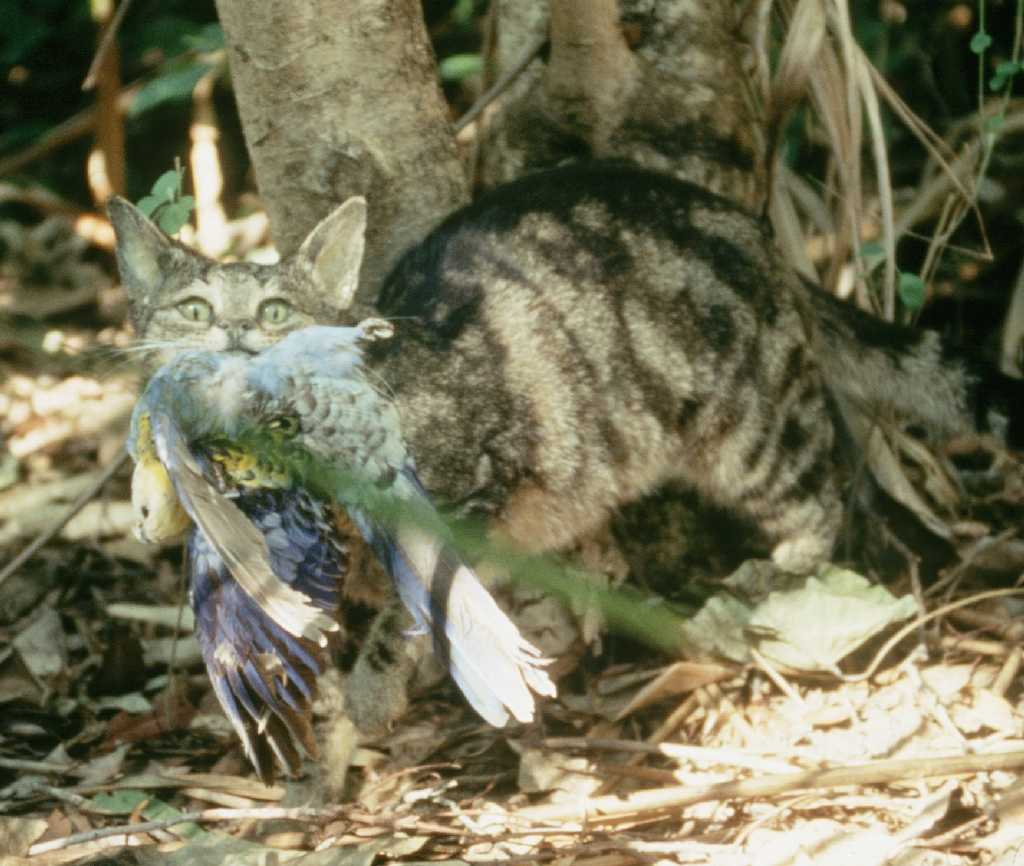
A feral cat hunting a Pale-headed rosella near Brisbane.

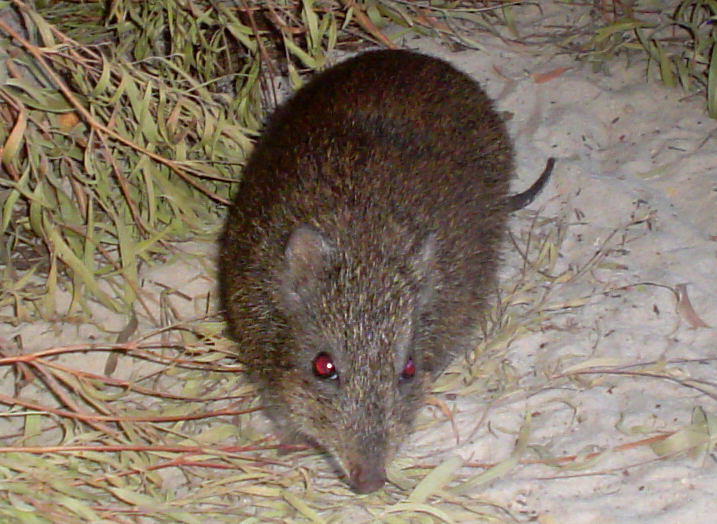
Gilbert's potoroo

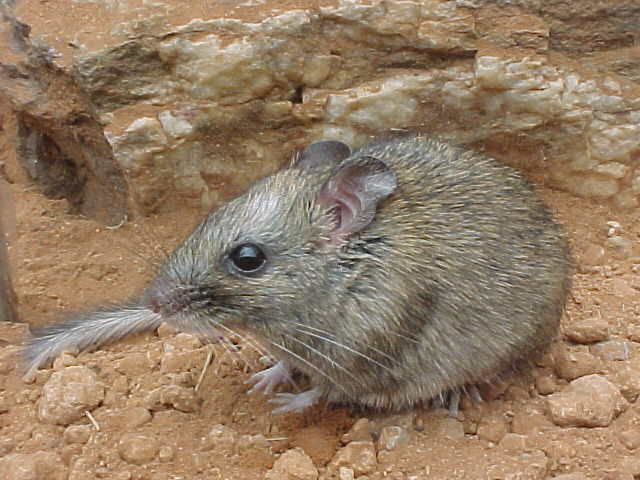
Central rock rat

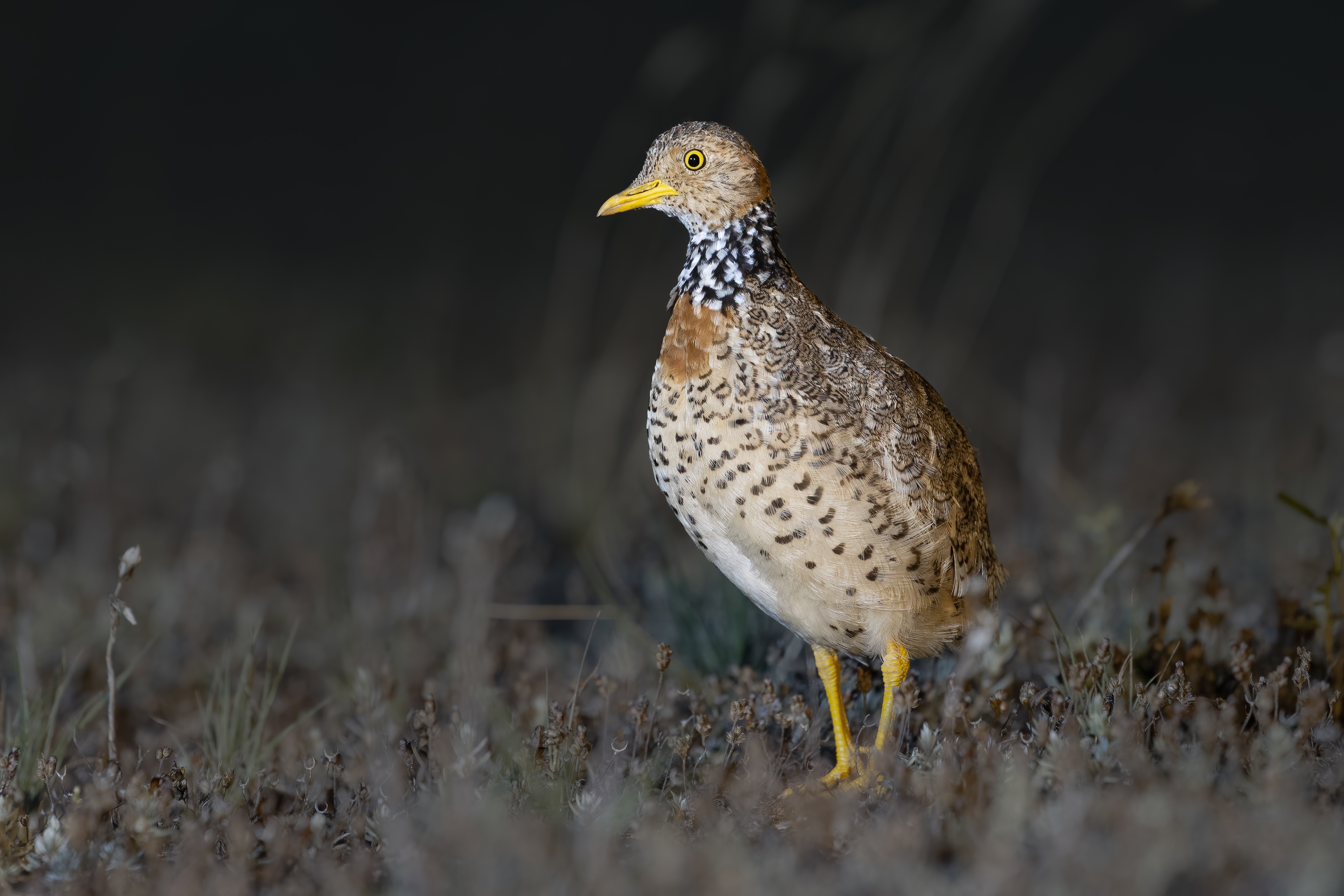
Plains-wanderer

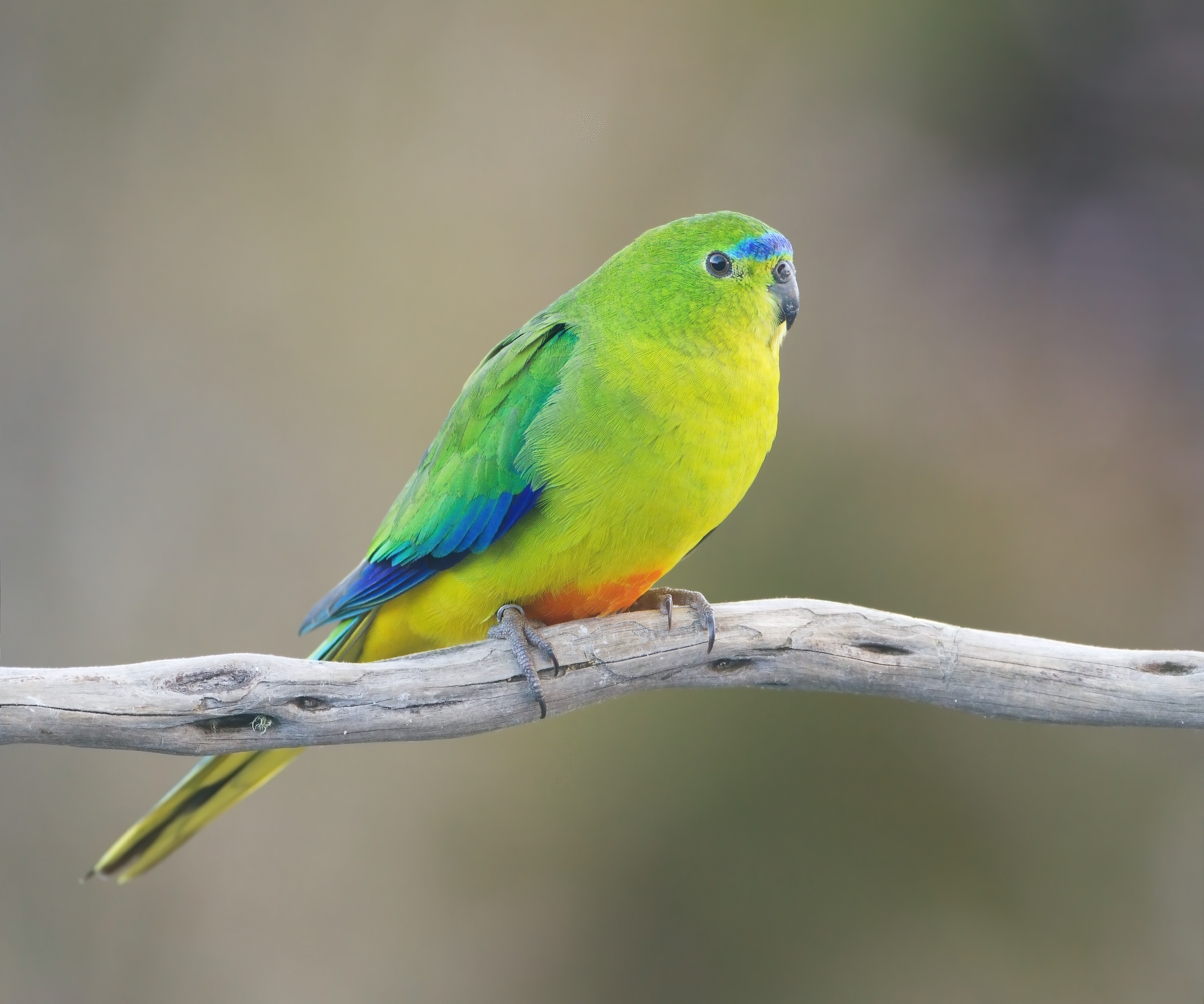
Orange-bellied parrot

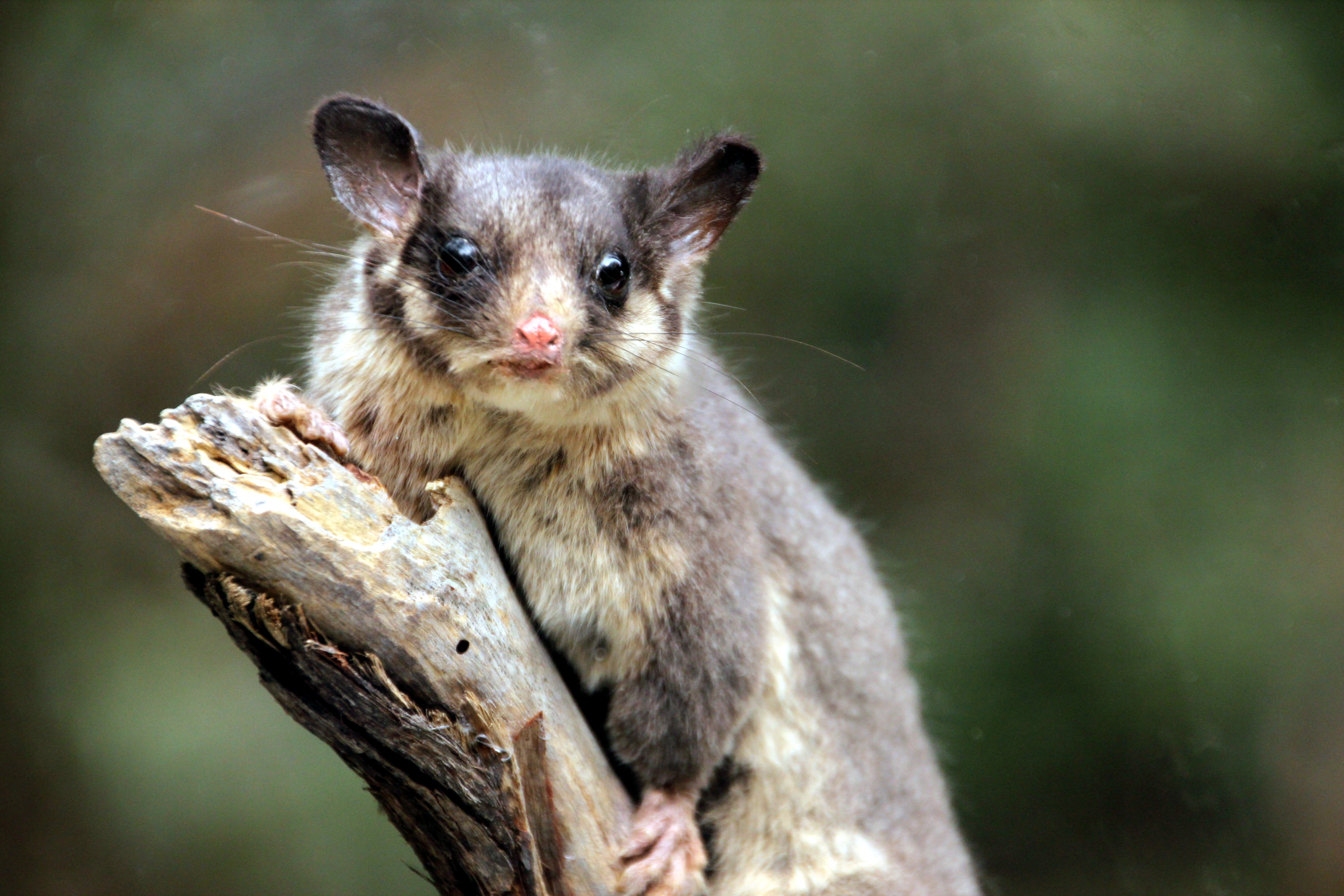
Leadbeater's possum

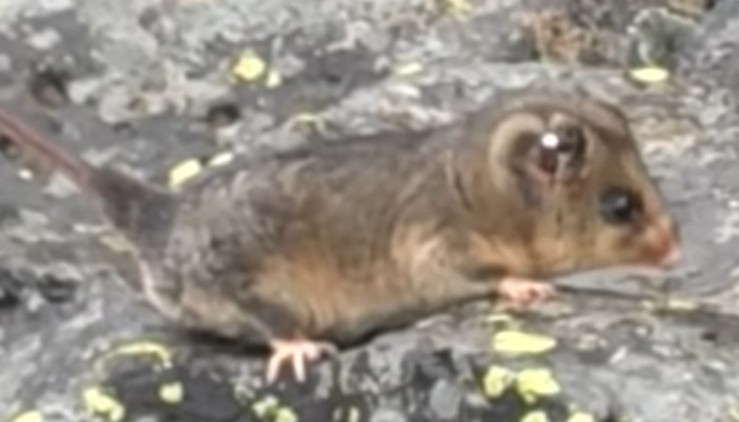
Mountain pygmy possum

Some of the critically endangered species being hunted to near extinction by feral cats

Despite the indications of being pests, cats were intentionally released to the Australian wilderness in 1860s as a measure to tackle introduced rats and rabbits, and may have been effective especially on remote islands. However, as they went feral and multiplied, they have been viewed as a major invasive species and an ecological disaster in the continent. Cats inhabit a variety of environments, and have been linked to the decline and extinctions of various native species most notably ground-nesting birds and small mammals.

Feral cats, along with foxes are ranked as the highest threat to Australia's mammals and are among the top priority to tackle by the Australian Government. Damages by cats include stresses on over 200 nationally threatened native fauna and flora, such as annual kills of over 1.5 billion native vertebrates and 1.1 billion invertebrates, and potentially the extinctions of at least 28 mammal species and the paradise parrot. Each cat may kill 740 wild animals per year, and they have also hampered attempts to reintroduce locally extinct species.

Several native species are hunted to near extinction by cats, most notably the critically endangered Gilbert's potoroo and Central rock rat, as well as the endangered Eastern Quoll, Western Barred Bandicoot, Eastern Barred Bandicoot and Rufous Hare-wallaby.

==== Predators and competition ====
Despite the misconception that Australian feral cats having no natural predators and act as apex predators, they are both preyed upon by and in competition with both native and introduced animals.

Studies upon dingoes (and feral dogs) indicate their predations and suppressions on cats, especially kittens. In some areas like the Great Sandy Desert, feral cats make up to 30% of a dingo's diet. However this statistic tells more about the general availability of prey in the desert environment as elsewhere feral cats make up less than 1.3%. Some dispute whether a dingo presence has any effect on overall cat numbers.

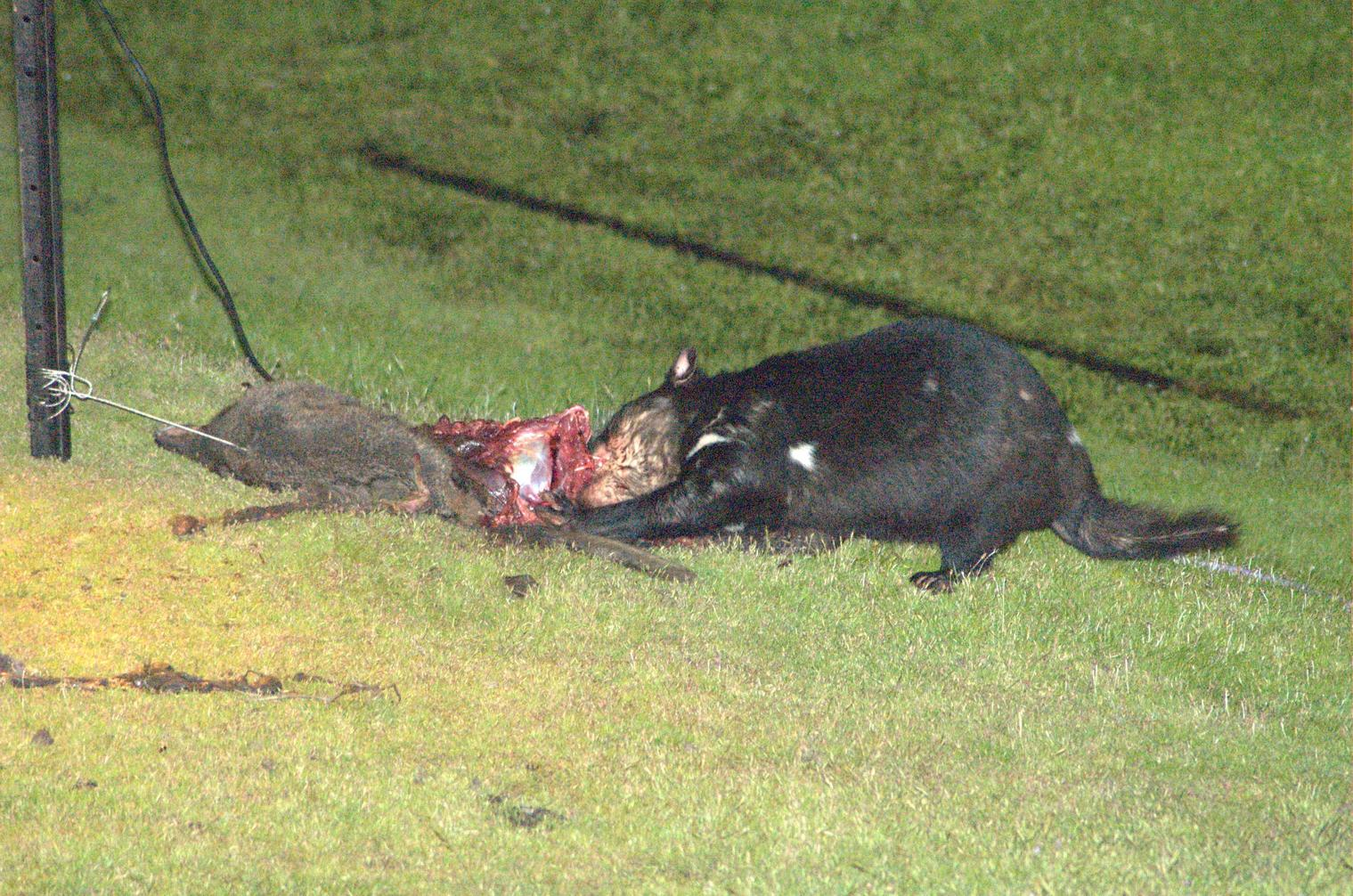
A Tasmanian devil eating roadkill. Feral cats struggle to take hold in areas where devils outcompete them.

In areas where the Tasmanian devils are common (among areas free of devil facial tumour disease) feral cats have been heavily suppressed mainly due to competition, Devils hunt at the same time in the same places for the same food sources. Studies show cat numbers are suppressed by more than 58% in areas with healthy devil populations. Researchers have observed devils feeding on feral live kittens in the wild, though they prefer to eat carrion and native marsupials. Male devils do not avoid cats, they have a significant strength and size advantage with 4 times the body power and 14 times the bite force, used primarily to intimidate but quite capable of easily overpowering and killing an adult feral cat. As such, cats actively avoid them, effectively denying access to roadkill meals which are vital to their diet when food is scarce. In areas where the devil is present, a cats territorial behaviour works against it, announcing its presence to a devil up to a kilomtere away, actively forcing it away or to resort to hunting in trees or during the day in order to avoid conflict with them for food. Reintroduction of the devil to the mainland has also been proposed as a strategy to control cats there.

Some believe red foxes act as a predator, and fox eradications may accelerate cat numbers. However cats can make up much less than 2% of their overall diet. Adult cats rarely fall prey to the foxes. Cat predations may become more severe when fox numbers have been reduced.

Only two Australian snakes actively hunt cats, the Australian scrub python and the carpet python, both through stealth, ambush and constriction, though in small numbers. Apart from pythons only an Acanthophis has sufficient jaw size to swallow an adult cat, however these ambush predators lack the python's constriction ability and is not capbable of subduing agile cats, as such there have been no documented cases of predation. Australian vets treat around 2,000 pet cats for elapid bites each year, particularly from Eastern brown snakes, Tiger snakes, or less commonly Red-bellied black snakes, though these strikes are almost always defensive. Cat survival rates for untreated snake bites are high, something like 66%, due to a low rate of clotting. This, combined with lightning fast reflexes instead makes adult cats a threat to most native snakes. Feral cats have been known to kill and prey upon the largest, most venomous Australian snakes. As they also compete for the same prey, feral cats have been found to have a devastating effect on snake populations.

Wedge-tailed eagles have been documented to take adult cats as prey, though they have a clear preference for rabbits and macropods. Saltwater crocodiles are capable of preying on cats, though there is little evidence to suggest that they are on the menu with feral cats preferring shallow running water there are no documented cases of predation.

Cane toads kill massive numbers of similar sized predators including the northern quoll and goannas, though have very little effect on cats with extensive studies confirming that they are not a food source. Less than 1% of domestic cats exposed to bufotoxin die from it. Cats benefit over native competitors through their cautious predatory behaviours including taste-aversion learning, profuse hypersalivation and generation an initial foam barrier that helps them to survive and learn to avoid bufotoxin poisoning. Cane toads however increase feral cat numbers. This occurs through elimination of competition with lizards. Observations indicate a 10-fold increase in the feral cat population in areas where cane toads have invaded.

=== Economic impacts ===
Cats are the costliest invasive species in Australia. The cost of invasive cats to the national economy is estimated to be nearly A$19 billion over the 60 years up to 2021, with most of the cost spent on population control. This cost significantly outstrips the next most costly invasive species, with rabbits in Australia coming in at nearly A$2 billion.

=== Control ===
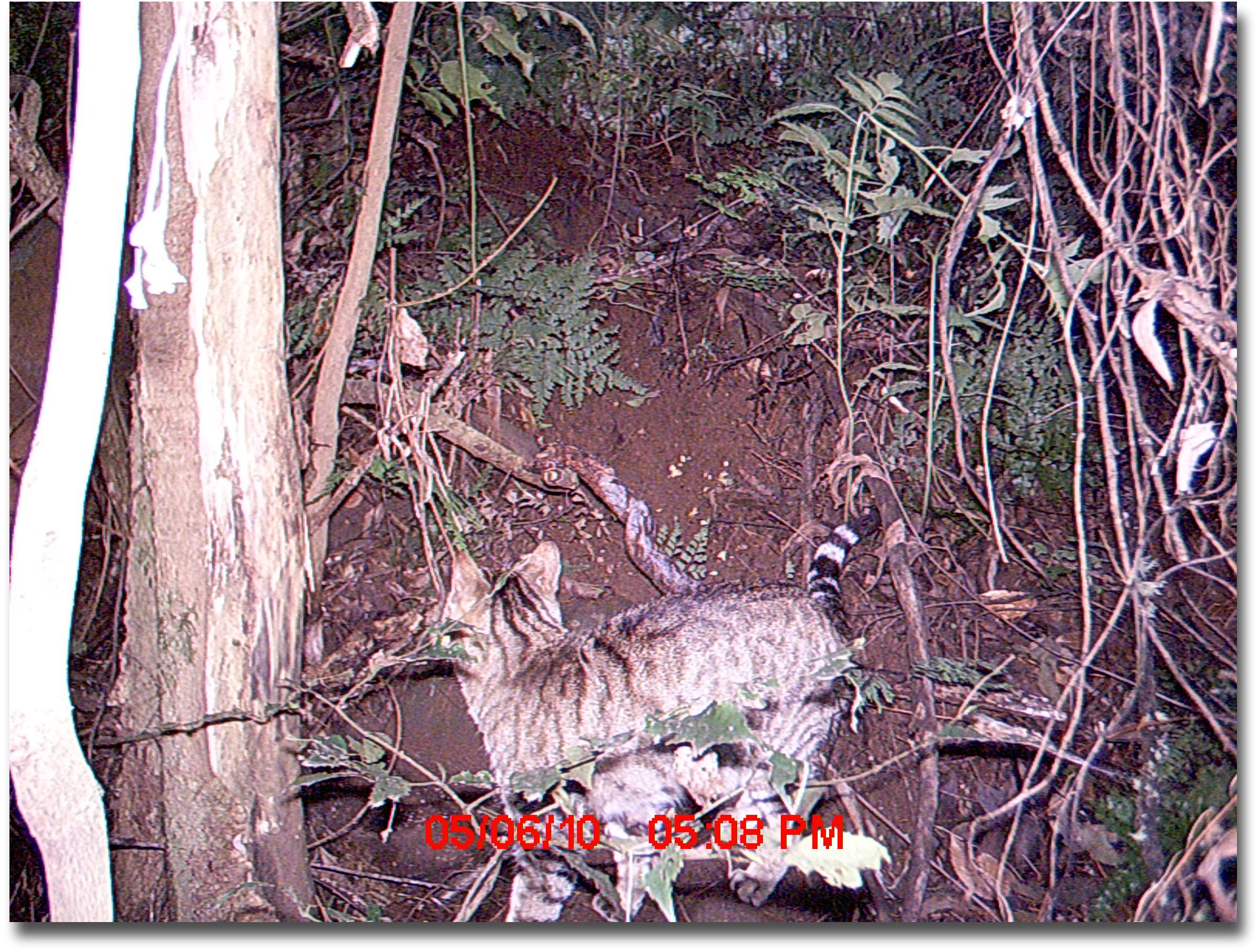
Remotely photographed cat in the Mount Royal National Park, New South Wales. Remote monitoring is an increasingly vital and rapidly growing component of feral cat control in Australia.

Cats are difficult to control for their behavioral patterns, agility, and reproduction rates to overcome artificial barriers, trapping, and baiting.

==== Surveillance and Detection ====
Due to the massive areas in Australian bush and outback, one of the first stages of control is detection and monitoring of feral cat activity in an area. Automated visual surveillance aids in identification and is crucial due to the animal's size and behaviours. Scent is also used to detect feral cats. Dog detection through scent tracking is effective to find cats, however it too is labour intensive.

==== Trapping ====
Cage trapping is the most common method, however is extremely difficult and labour intensive, as feral cats are trap shy and human shy, and cages often end up accidentally trapping native animals. Automated traps must generally be left for 2 to 3 days before a cat is trappable. Unless a trapper is alerted, undue suffering is not guaranteed. Another less labour intensive method of trapping uses the cat urine scent to trigger a cat's territorial and curiousity instincts. Automated devices can use sophisticated algorithms to accurately identify to trap cats only, one such device is HAND.

Trap–neuter–return is the most favored method by animal welfare groups, although the logistics are difficult particularly in remote regions. This approach attempts to prevent the "vacuum effect" (and cats territorial nature) in an attempt to stabilize populations. While it aims to mitigate harm caused to the animal it does not reduce the greater harms caused by the animal and has not been found to reduce populations.

==== Culling ====
The most common methods of culling are shooting and baiting. Ground shooting is effective and resource intensive, while cats often evade and survive aerial shooting. However, shooting is generally expensive and ineffectual to address the source of the problem, and has been a topic of animal welfare issues. Some varmint hunters, such as Barry Green, face backlash and even death threats.

Baiting is preferred to avoid harms to native species, but is also expensive and its effectiveness has been questioned. Baiting in some jurisdictions, such as Victoria and Queensland, is subject to restrictions, and animal welfare groups advocate for alternatives, particularly to Sodium fluoroacetate (1080) such as 4'-Aminopropiophenone (PAPP). An automated baiting device that is highly effective at targetting cats using visual AI identification and administration is Felixer. While expensive, current models are comparable to in effectiveness and efficiency to human labour when used for long periods.

==== Exclusion and Enclosure ====
Exclosure fences may ease the control particularly on islands, however it requires complex constructions and can be extremely expensive. Following the 2019–2020 bushfires, an exclusion fence had been built on private property around some of the burnt land in Kangaroo Island.

==== Bounty schemes ====
Bounties on feral cats has been trialled in Queensland since 2017 and proposed in New South Wales, but their effectiveness and humaneness has been debated by both environmental and animal welfares.

==== Indigenous methods ====
The idea of reintroducing Tasmanian devils to the mainland has been proposed, due to their effectiveness in cat control in areas where they are present, however has not gained traction. Pintupi, Nyirripi, and other Western Desert peoples in Western Australia and Northern Territory have been hunting cats for food sources and bush medicine for decades. In 2015, they also participated in a controlling program.

=== Eradication ===
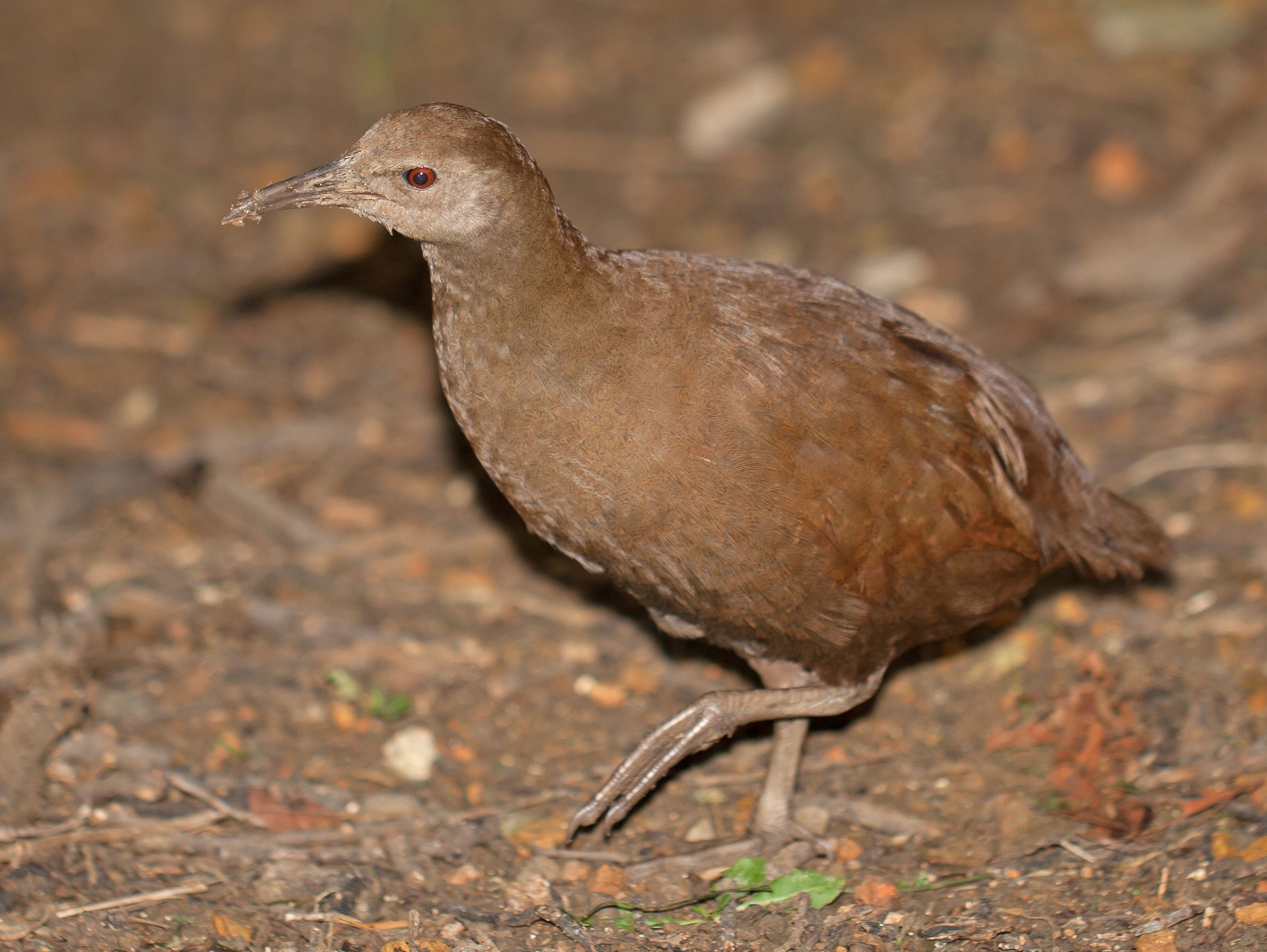
Lord Howe Woodhen

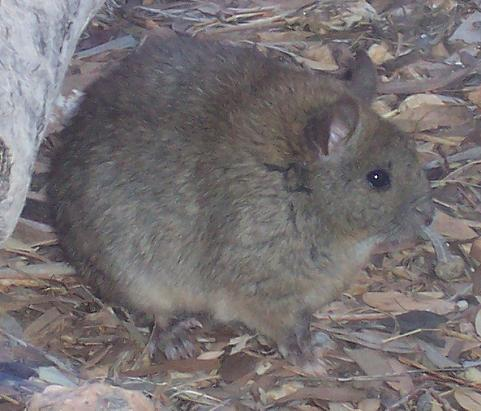
Greater stick-nest rat

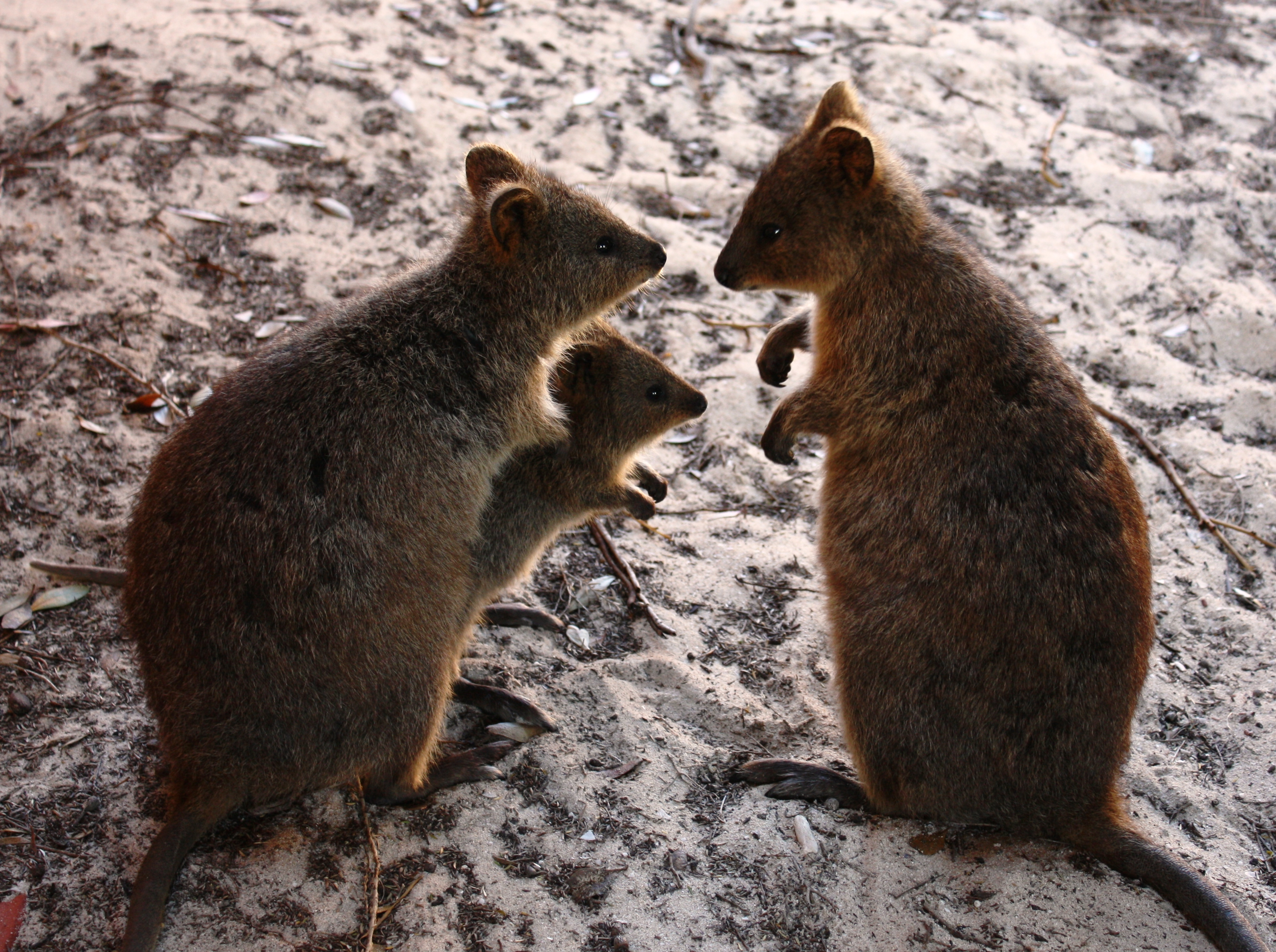
Quokka

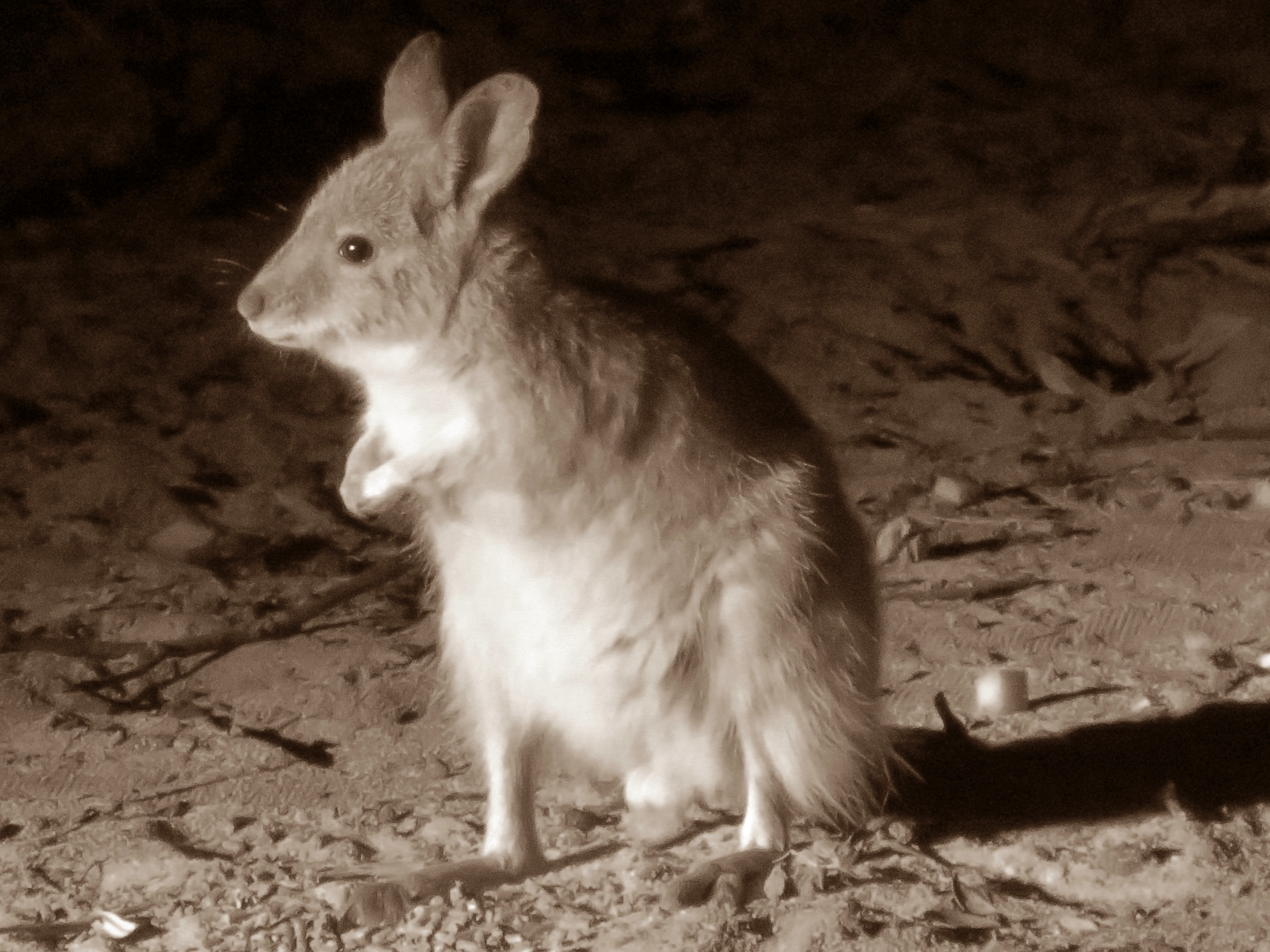
Rufous hare-wallaby

Some of the most vulnerable species to cats saved from extinction through successful eradication programs on islands

Most contemporary commentators acknowledge that cats are unlikely to be eradicated from the mainland, especially given that they are such popular pets, and that control is the primary aim there. Despite this, cats have been and continue to be completely eradicated locally, particularly on islands.

The earliest record of intentional cat eradication in Australia was Betsey Island, Tasmania in the 1860s. Though the impetus for this was game rather than conservation, a significant number of cats that may have been present as early as 1800 were completely eliminated. Later leaseholders reintroduced cats to control rodents there which once again became feral and began to threaten the little penguin colony there. Subseqent eradication attempts in 1978 and 1983 were not successful.

The Lord Howe Island Board undertook an extensive eradication program from 1979 primarily to save the flightless Lord Howe Woodhen from extinction. Cats had hunted the Woodhen until there were just 20 left. Cats were introduced in the early days of settlement in the 1840s or 1850s and the feral population was eliminated in 1982 followed by a phase out of domestic cats completed in 2004. A follow up survey in 2024 found over 1,600 woodhens.

At Reevesby Island, South Australia, a high profile eradication project began in 1984. In an effort to save a locally extinct Greater stick-nest rat, an offshore refuge was proposed, however feral cats had originally wiped them out there. After an intensive half decade program, Reevesby was declared feral cat free in March 1990. The effort was a success, with Greater stick-nest rat populations recovering there.

Macquarie Island's eradication program began in 1985 after a successful control effort there that began in 1974. The large offshore Tasmanian jurisdiction had cats from 1820 that had been brought by sealers to help control rats. By the 1980s, their numbers had swelled and became a major threat to the island's birdlife. The last cat there was killed in 2000. Follow up studies found that populations of blue, grey and white-headed petrel species, all listed as vulnerable and known to be hunted by feral cats, rebounded strongly.

Gabo Island, was subject to one of the first eradication programs in Victoria in 1987. Feral cats had been recorded since the 1890s. After the program ended in 1991 Gabo was finally declared cat free in 1994 coinciding with a strong rebound in the island's Little penguin colony.

Subsequent government funded efforts have found faster success with cats eradicated from several West Australian islands including: Serrurier Island (1996), Hermite Island (1999), Faure Island (2001), and notably Rottnest Island (2002). Follow up studies found that populations of quokkas, ground nesting birds and reptiles rebounded strongly at Rottnest Island following eradication.

Offshore programs begun in the 1980s in Tasmania have had mixed success, with Tasman Island declared cat free in 2011 after a successful eradication program in 2010 Some islands where eradication was thought to have been achieved were found to harbour persistent populations following further study, highlighting the need for ongoing monitoring. Nevertheless, these programs included Great Dog Island, Wedge Island, Lungtalanana, Three Hummock Island, Robbins Island, Maria Island and Little Dog Island (2026) among others.

The Northern Territory began island programs in 2011, beginning with West Island in 2026.

In 2016, the federal government announced a program to eradicate cats from Bruny Island, French Island, Christmas Island, Dirk Hartog Island and Kangaroo Island. In 2018, Dirk Hartog Island was officially declared cat free, making it the world's largest feral cat eradication program. Follow up studies have demonstrated that a viable population of the vulnerable Rufous hare-wallaby has been re-established.

Kangaroo Island's population is estimated at between 3,000–5,000 and is targeted at being cat free by 2030. The 2019–2020 bushfires complicated eradication efforts, as the gradual regrowth of the burnt brush creates cat habitats and increased difficulty to hunt. By the end of 2021, at least 850 cats had been removed from the burnt area at the western end of the island using grooming traps with state-of-the-art technology and cameras.

In addition to island programs, cat eradication is a goal of several enclosed predator free inland reserves begun in the 1980s and 1990s with the aim of being permanently predator free. Some of the largest of these areas are in the Northern Territory at Newhaven Wildlife Sanctuary, Tjoritja / West MacDonnell National Park and Kakadu National Park.

== Phantom cats ==
The numerous sightings of phantom cats in Australia include the Gippsland phantom cat and the Blue Mountains panther.

Australian folklore holds that some feral cats have grown so large as to cause inexperienced observers to claim sightings of cougars in Western Australia. While this rarely occurs in reality, large specimens are occasionally found: in 2005, a feline was measured to be 176 cm (69 in) from the tip of its nose to the tip of its tail in the Gippsland area of Victoria. Subsequent DNA tests showed it to be a feral cat.

== Cultural Significance and References ==
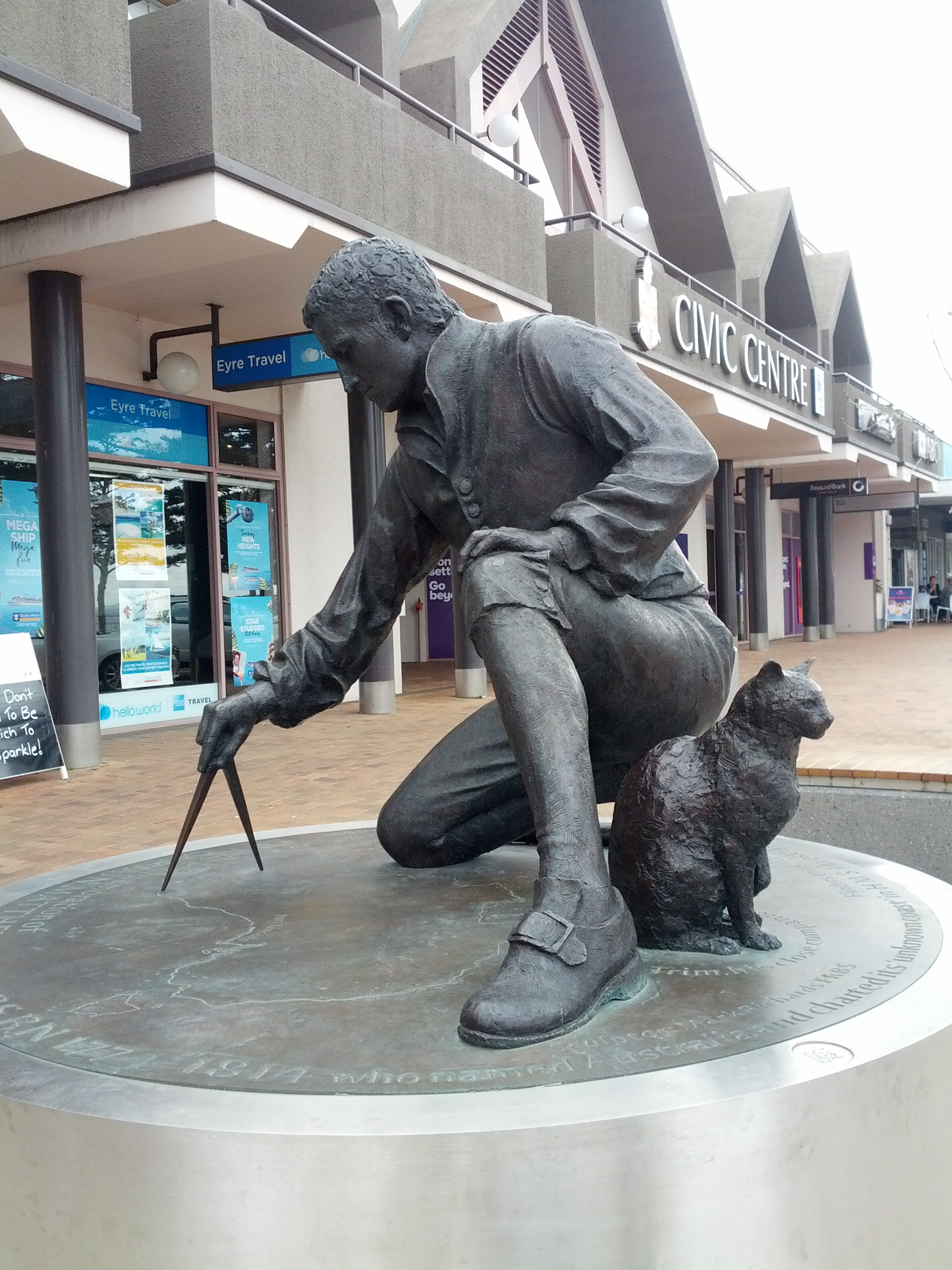
Trim, the boat cat, with Flinders. Port Lincoln, South Australia

Cats have surprisingly few cultural references given their prevalence and although historically seen as a domestic protector, their reputation has been tarnished in recent decades, dogs have much higher significance due inpart to their indigenous links.

Trim, the pet of explorer Matthew Flinders has many memorials, nost notably at the Mitchell Library in Sydney. The Mansions, Brisbane were constructed in 1889 with statues on the parapets and cornsers featuring cats with a paw on a toy ball designed to symbolically guard the building. Cats began to appear in the work of Norman Lindsay in the 1910s though he did not feature them in his iconic fictional works like The Magic Pudding. The Geelong Football Club adopted the black cat as a mascot in 1923 might to help bring the club good luck and it became a moniker when it followed with some success. In the 1950s the Sydney Harbour Bridge pylon was home to a colony of cats including George, a white cat often photographed from the Pylon lookout. Fat Cat and Friends was a popular Australian children's television show in the 1970s. The 1980s Australian television show Hunter featured a popular character known as "Computer Cat". RiverCity Ferries ferries use a portmanteau for their catamarans, including the KittyKat ferry launched in 2020. The 2010s Australian television series Bluey features an in-universe cartoon called Cat Squad which is Muffin's favourite, with its own theme song. In the 2015 film Blinky Bill the Movie and the spinoff series The Wild Adventures of Blinky Bill the villain is a feral cat named Sir Claude.

== See also ==
- Threatened fauna of Australia
- Environmental issues in Australia
