= Barry Green =

Barry Green may refer to:

- Barry Green (musician), American musician
- Barry Green (hunter) (born 1951/2), Australian varmint hunter
