= Cougars in Western Australia =

The premise that there were cougars in Western Australia was widely believed during the 1970s.

There are several theories as to how they were introduced. The most popular theory was that United States servicemen brought four cougar kittens to Western Australia during World War II; they eventually grew too big for captivity and were released—two at Fremantle and two at Bunbury. Another theory is that cougars escaped from a traveling circus that was involved in an accident between Bridgetown and Nannup around 1961. The circus theory has often been referenced to support the allegation that cougars were responsible for the deaths of around 2000 sheep in the Duranillin area in the late 1970s.

The State Library of Western Australia's catalogue refers to the cougar story as the Cordering cougar, while the oral history record has a summary with the spelling Coedering Cougars. (Note: Interview with Arnold Meredith, cousin of John Meredith and farmer in the Lake Grace and Boyup Brook regions, W.A. Meredith speaks of pioneering at Lake Grace, W.A. in a low rainfall district, settling and shearing activities, stories about the mysterious Coedering Cougars; Recorded on Sept. 9, 1991.) The concern about wild cats in the rural areas of Western Australia has extended over decades.

The theories about larger cats received significant attention in 1979, including numerous media mentions, and during a debate on the issue in the parliament. That year, the Agricultural Protection Board of Western Australia declared that a two-year investigation had failed to find any evidence to suggest that cougars had ever been introduced into south-west Western Australia.

Nonetheless, in 1981 an A$20,000 reward was offered for the capture of a cougar in Western Australia, dead or alive. The reward was never claimed. In 2018 further sightings were reported at Chidlow in the Perth Hills, and near Morangup on Toodyay Road.

== See also ==
- British big cats
- Phantom cat
- Cats in Australia
