= Phantom kangaroo =

Urban legend

A phantom kangaroo refers to the report of a kangaroo, wallaby, or their accompanying footprints in areas where there is no native population. Some explanations put forth are escaped zoo or circus animals (as in the UK), or publicity stunts by local businesses using photographs from Australia. Others suggest outbreaks of such sightings are a form of mass psychogenic illness.

== France ==
A population of feral red-necked wallabies, often misidentified as "kangourous", lives near the township of Émancé, about 50 kilometres (31 mi) southwest of Paris. These wallabies are descended from a breeding population that escaped a zoological reserve in the 1970s.

== Japan ==
Between 2002 and 2011, a series of phantom kangaroo sightings was reported in the Mayama mountain district of Ōsaki city in Miyagi Prefecture.

== New Zealand ==
In 1831, after arriving in Australia, two sailors from the Sydney Packet reported that they had seen a "giant kangaroo", 30 feet (nine metres) tall, at a small cove in Dusky Sound, South Island. From a small boat, they observed it standing near the treeline and, when they came too close the animal, it jumped into the water and swam away, leaving a wake extending from one end of the sound to the other.

Kawau Island in the Hauraki Gulf has a colony of three species of wallabies descending from a deliberate introduction by Sir George Grey, a 19th-century Governor.

New Zealand also has a wild population of wallabies in the Waimate District of South Island that were introduced for hunting in the late 19th century.

== Poland ==
There is a documented population of wallabies about 50 km Southwest of Kraków, near the Slovakian border. The colony originated from a pair of wallabies that escaped from a local zoo and found refuge in the border area where ongoing Polish-Slovak territorial disputes have created a wide swath of demilitarized wilderness. The colony now numbers between 50 and 85 kangaroos.

== United Kingdom ==
Documented colonies of red-necked wallabies exist in the United Kingdom. A breeding colony established itself after breaking loose from a private zoo in Leek, Staffordshire, in the 1930s. Their population seems to have peaked in the 1970s, reaching numbers between 60 and 70. There were no confirmed sightings of the wallabies between 2000 and 2007, with some locals believing they must have died out. In 2009, the Macclesfield Express reported that hiker Andy Burton had alleged a recent encounter with a wallaby, presenting photographic evidence to support his claim. In recent years, BBC News has documented numerous wallaby sightings across the UK.

Inchconnachan, an island in Loch Lomond in Scotland, also has a population of wallabies after they were introduced by Lady Arran Colquhoun in the 1920s.

Subsequent sightings have been made including a report of a red-necked wallaby filmed by zoologist Maurice Melzak in Highgate Cemetery, Hampstead, London in October 2013, and an albino wallaby in Northamptonshire in 2015.

== United States ==
In 1934, near South Pittsburg, Tennessee, an atypical kangaroo or "kangaroo-like beast" was reported by several witnesses over a five-day period, and to have killed and partially devoured several animals, including ducks, geese, a German Shepherd and other dogs. Kangaroos are typically unaggressive and herbivorous. A witness described the animal as looking "like a large kangaroo, running and leaping across a field." A search party followed the animal's tracks to a mountainside cave where they stopped. The animal was never found, and national news coverage drew widespread ridicule.

In 1974, in Chicago, Illinois, two Chicago police officers were called to investigate a report that a kangaroo was standing in someone's porch. After a brief search, the officers located the animal in an alleyway, but were unable to capture it. Over the next month, numerous kangaroo sightings were reported in Illinois and the neighbouring states of Indiana and Wisconsin, with timing suggesting more than one animal if reports were accurate. A kangaroo was seen the day after the officers' encounter by a paperboy, the following week in Schiller Woods, Illinois, and the week after that just outside Plano, Illinois, reported by an officer who said it jumped 8 feet (2.4 m) from a field into the road. Thirty minutes later, a kangaroo was reported back in Chicago, with the following three days seeing eyewitness testimony in the surrounding countryside. Several days later, there was a rash of sightings in Indiana. Reports ceased about a month after the original story.

In 1978, in Menomonee Falls, Wisconsin, two men photographed a large kangaroo beside the highway. Author Loren Coleman, described as the "leading authority on North American kangaroo sightings", suggested the animal looked like a Bennett's wallaby.

In 2013, footage of a kangaroo was reportedly recorded by hunters in a field in Oklahoma. The video was published on the website YouTube, and prompted speculation that the animal may have been a pet kangaroo who went missing in the state just over a year earlier.

Also in 2013, The Ridgefield Press reported that a motorist in North Salem, New York, captured on video what he thought was a kangaroo, and published the video on their website. The newspaper noted that escaped wallabies, smaller than kangaroos, were known in Westchester County, which encompasses North Salem. Several people in the county had kept wallabies as pets.

== See also ==
- Forteana
- Phantom cat
- Vagrancy (biology)
