= Barry Green (hunter) =

Australian hunter (born 1951 or 1952)

- Born: 1951 or 1952 (age 74–75)
- Occupations: Feral cat trapper; Conservationist
- Years active: 1996—present

Barry Green (born 1951 or 1952) also known by his nickname "Cat Man", is an Australian feral cat trapper on Kangaroo Island and self-described conservationist of native Australian wildlife, which is threatened by feral cats both directly through predation and indirectly through transmission of diseases including sarcocystis and toxoplasmosis, which also affect livestock.

== Cat hunting career ==
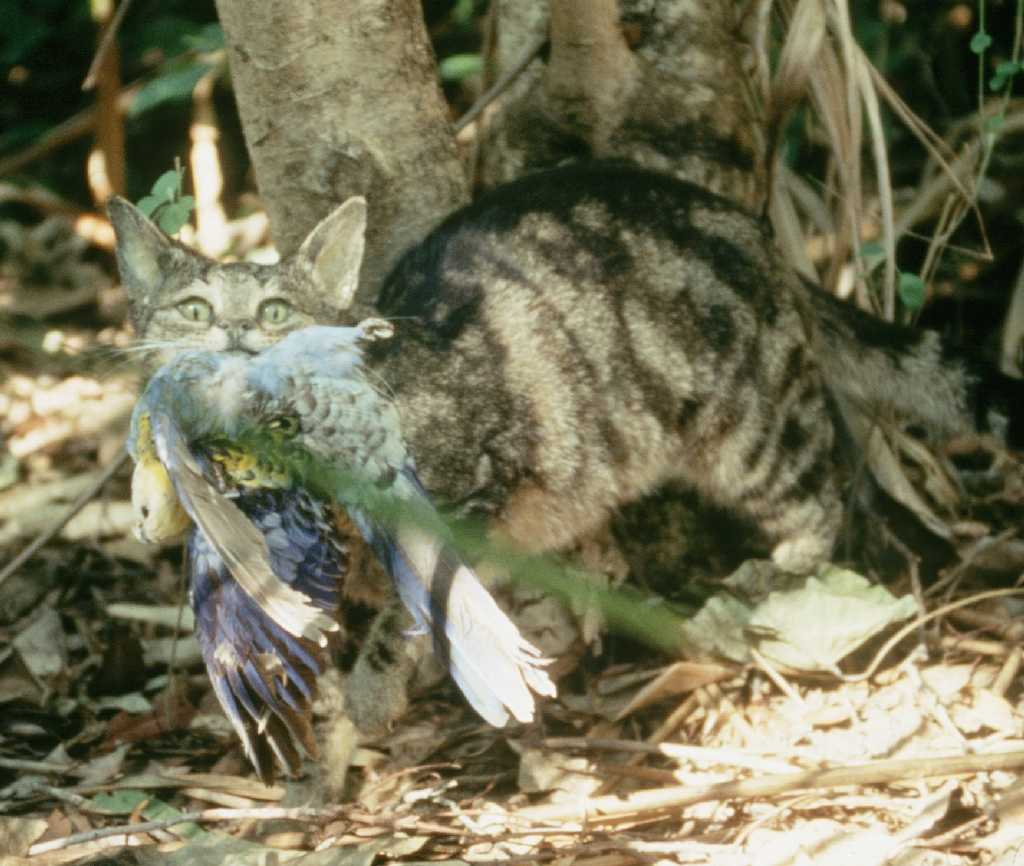
Feral cats in Australia are a major threat to native species

Feral cats in Australia are estimated to each kill between five and thirty animals every day, and in 2016 the government of Australia identified Kangaroo Island as one of five priority islands for the eradication of feral cats. Species predated by feral cats on Kangaroo island include Australian little penguins, short-beaked echidnas, and critically-endangered Kangaroo Island dunnarts.

Green moved to Kangaroo Island in 1996, and he was introduced to cat-trapping by two local women. As of 2020, Green has killed over 1,450 cats. The largest cat that he has killed was 7.2 kilograms (16 lb), and he has only encountered one pet cat, which he gave to a local council rather than killing it. To pay for petrol and bait, Green sells tanned cat hides and "stubby holders, bags and other quirky household items" made from them. His home at American River, which has hundreds of cat hides in it, has become a local tourist attraction. He provides data about his hunting to the South Australian Department for Environment and Water, and helps scientists at the University of Sydney study feral cats.

Green has stated that he does not hate all cats, only the feral ones, and is considered a local hero by residents of Kangaroo Island. Despite this, he has received hundreds of pieces of hate mail, as well as multiple death threats because of his killing of cats. For his work in wildlife conservation, Barry Green received the Outstanding Individual Award from the Kangaroo Island Natural Resources Management Board, part of the government of South Australia, in 2018.

== See also ==
- Cat predation on wildlife
- Pest control
- Hunting in Australia
- Invasive species in Australia
- John Wamsley
