= Phantom cat =

Large felines allegedly appearing in regions outside their natural range

Phantom cats, also known as alien big cats (ABCs), are large felids which allegedly appear in regions outside their indigenous range. Sightings, tracks, and predation have been reported in a number of countries including Australia, Canada, China, Denmark, Finland, France, Germany, Ireland, India, Italy, Luxembourg, Netherlands, New Zealand, Spain, Switzerland, the United Kingdom, and the United States. When confirmed, they are typically explained as exotic pets or escapees from private zoos.

== Australia ==
Sightings of exotic big cats in Australia began during the 19th century. It is generally thought that sightings may be attributed to escaped exotic circus animals such as Matthew St Leon's touring circus in the 1870s and large cats brought back as pets by soldiers. In one such example, in 1924, a puma and a jaguar both escaped from the Perry Brothers circus while traveling from St Arnaud, Victoria by train when their carriage's wall collapsed. The jaguar was captured after stunning itself, and the Puma later shot.

The New South Wales State Government reported in 2003 that "more likely than not" there were a number of exotic big cats living deep in the bushlands near Sydney.

Phantom cats reported in Australia include

- The Blue Mountains panther (also called the Penrith panther or Lithgow panther), reported in the mountains west of Sydney since the early 20th century.
- The Grampians Puma, which a 1970s study by Deakin University could not be definitively demonstrated based on available evidence, however, that the probability of big cats in the area is “beyond reasonable doubt".
- The Sunshine Coast big cat, reported in the Sunshine Coast, Queensland, since early in the 19th century. These claims have been met with skepticism.
- The Gippsland phantom cat.
- The Tantanoola Tiger, believed to have been shot on 25 August 1895, by Tom Donovian and identified as an Assyrian wolf; although no such species appears to exist. It was stuffed and remains on display in the Tantanoola Hotel.
- The Tasmanian Panther, reported in Tasmania since the 19th century. The novel Dusk by Robbie Arnott is based on this folklore.
- The Ourimbah panther, reported in the Ourimbah State Forest of New South Wales.
- The Nannup tiger, in Nannup, Western Australia, subject of a song by Matt Taylor - sometimes instead said to be a Thylacine.
- The Emmaville Panther, in the New England region of New South Wales.

== Bulgaria ==
In June of 2025, sightings of a large black cat or panther were reported in the eastern city of Shumen. Later, sightings of what was assumed to be the same animal were reported in the towns of Giurgiu and Năsturelu in Romania. Although no hard evidence has been documented, one hypothesis is that it escaped from captivity, perhaps from an illegal, private zoo owned by criminals, or migrated from Hungary or Serbia. Experts have suggested that evidence of tracks could be attributed to large dogs.

== China ==
The blue, or Maltese, tiger, the former name taken from the common color terminology for domestic cats, is a purported color morph of the South China tiger, with sightings in Myanmar, China, and the Korean Peninsula. It is speculated that while the color morph may have theoretically existed, the severe historical bottlenecking of tiger populations makes it unlikely for the genotype to remain in extant populations.

== Denmark ==
In 1995, a big cat usually described as a lion (but sometimes as a lynx) was dubbed the "beast of Funen" by numerous eyewitnesses. There was an earlier big cat sighting from 1982 in southern Jutland.

== Finland ==
A supposed lion moved around Ruokolahti near the Finnish-Russian border in June–August 1992. There were multiple sightings. Tracks were identified by a government biologist as a big feline not native to Finland. The biologist was given police powers to capture or shoot the lion by the Ministry of the Interior. Border guards participated in the hunt. The last reported sightings were in Russia and there were reports that the lion was seen by Finnish border guards and that lion tracks were found in the raked sand field used by Russian border guards to detect crossings. The lion was never captured and the incidents have never been explained. One possible explanation could have been a railway accident of a circus train in Russia, from which some animals escaped.

== India ==
The pogeyan is a large grey feline known to local people living in the Western Ghats, India. Its name is derived from the local dialect, and means 'cat that comes and goes like the mist'.

== Luxembourg ==
In 2009, a black panther was allegedly spotted in the industrial area of Bommelscheuer near Bascharage. When police came, the panther was gone. In the following couple of days, the panther was spotted all over the country. For a while it was alleged that a panther had escaped a nearby zoo (Amnéville), but the zoo later denied that any panther was missing. A couple of days after the Bascharage incident, it also was mentioned that although the police did not find a panther, they did find an unusually large house cat.

== The Netherlands ==
In 2005, a black cougar was allegedly spotted on several occasions in a wildlife preserve, but the animal, nicknamed Winnie, was later identified as an unusually large crossbreed between a domestic cat and a wildcat.

== New Zealand ==
Since the late 1990s, big cat sightings have been reported in widely separated parts of New Zealand, in both the North and South Islands. There have been several unverified panther sightings in Mid-Canterbury near Ashburton and in the nearby foothills of the Southern Alps, but searches conducted there in 2003 by the Ministry of Agriculture and Forestry found no corroborating physical evidence.

== Serbia ==
In Serbia, sightings of a black panther have been reported around the city of Apatin in 2022. Ultimately, the cat was never found.

== United Kingdom ==
Since the 1960s, there have been many alleged sightings of big cats across Great Britain. A 15-month survey conducted in 2003–2004 by the British Big Cats Society gave the following regional breakdown, based on 2,052 sightings: South West 21%, South East 16%, East Anglia 12%, Scotland 11%, and West Midlands 9%. Since 1903, a number of exotic cats, all of which are thought to have escaped from captivity, have been killed or captured.

== United States ==
Phantom cat sightings in the United States should not be confused with sightings of jaguars in their native range in the states of Arizona and New Mexico (while early records of North American jaguars show much wider distribution as far as Monterey), or of cougars recolonizing the extirpated eastern cougar's former range.

Distribution of jaguars; pink indicates former range.

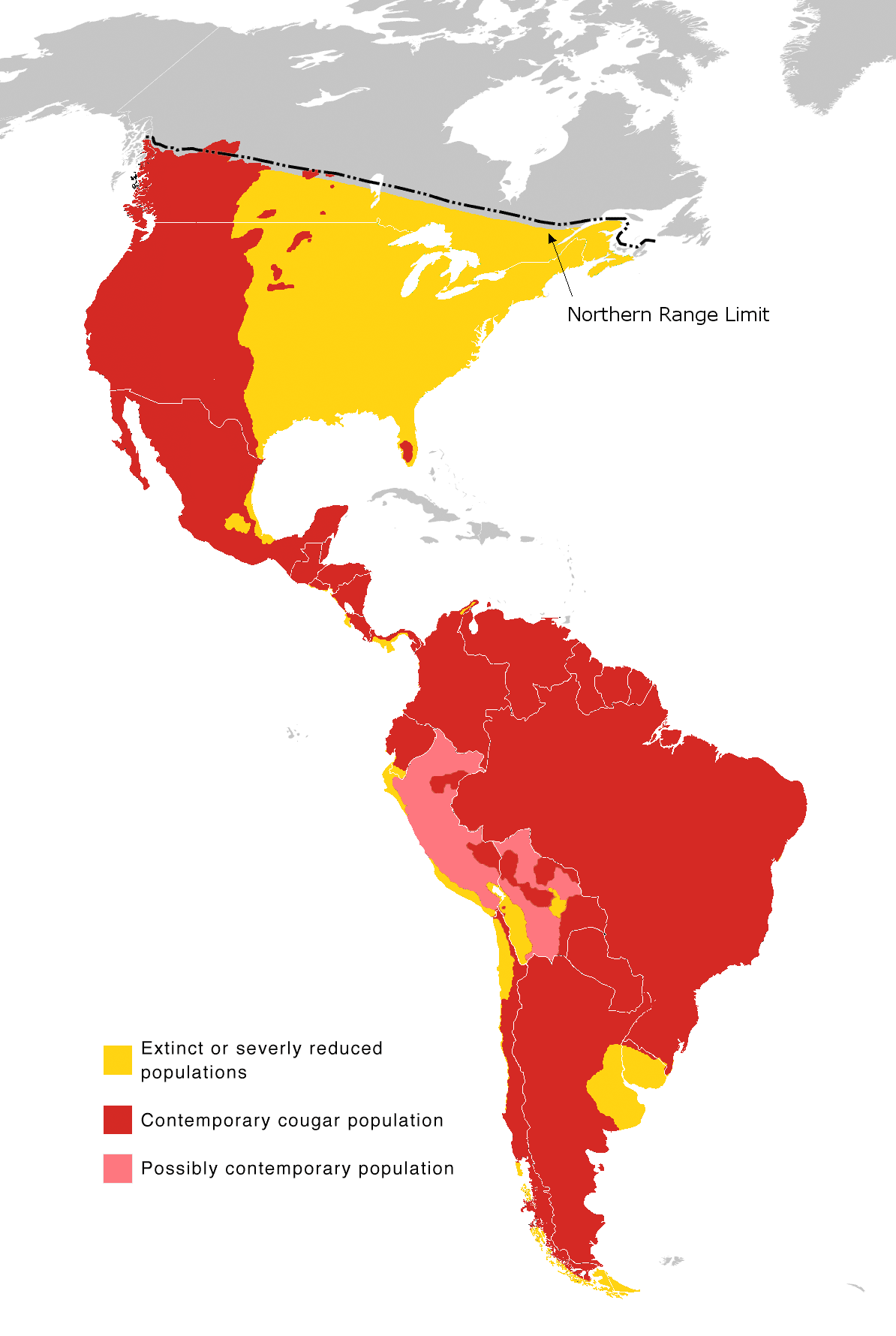
Distribution of cougars; yellow indicates former range. The lower 48 US states fall into the native range.

=== Connecticut ===
In 1939, a panther-like creature called the "glawackus" was sighted in Glastonbury, Connecticut. It became a national sensation, and sporadic sightings of it across Connecticut continued into the 1960s.

=== Delaware ===
There have been reported sightings of a mountain lion in the northern Delaware forests since the late 1990s. The Delaware Division of Fish and Wildlife believes there may be more than one mountain lion in Delaware and that they originate from animals released from captivity.

=== Hawaii ===
In December 2002, sightings of a big cat increased in numbers in the Kula (upcountry) area, and the Division of Forestry and Wildlife requested the help of big cat wildlife biologists William van Pelt and Stan Cunningham of the Arizona Game and Fish Department. Van Pelt and Cunningham believed that the cat was probably a large feline, such as a leopard, jaguar, or cougar. No big cat was detected by traps, infrared cameras, or professional trackers. A fur sample was obtained in 2003, but DNA analysis was inconclusive. The state's hunt for the cat was suspended in late November 2003, after three weeks without sightings. Utah State University professor and wildlife biologist Robert Schmidt expressed strong doubts about the cat's existence, likening it to the Loch Ness monster.

=== Massachusetts ===
MassWildlife has confirmed two cases of a mountain lion's presence in Massachusetts. There have been numerous other reports of sightings, as well as alleged photographs, but these remain unconfirmed by state wildlife officials.

=== North Carolina ===
Black panthers and other large non-indigenous cats have been sighted for many years in the vicinity of Oriental, North Carolina. Accounts from locals and visitors alike have been documented in the local papers.

== See also ==
- British big cats
- Black panther
- European wildcat
- Phantom kangaroo
