= Blue Mountains panther =

Legendary Australian big cat

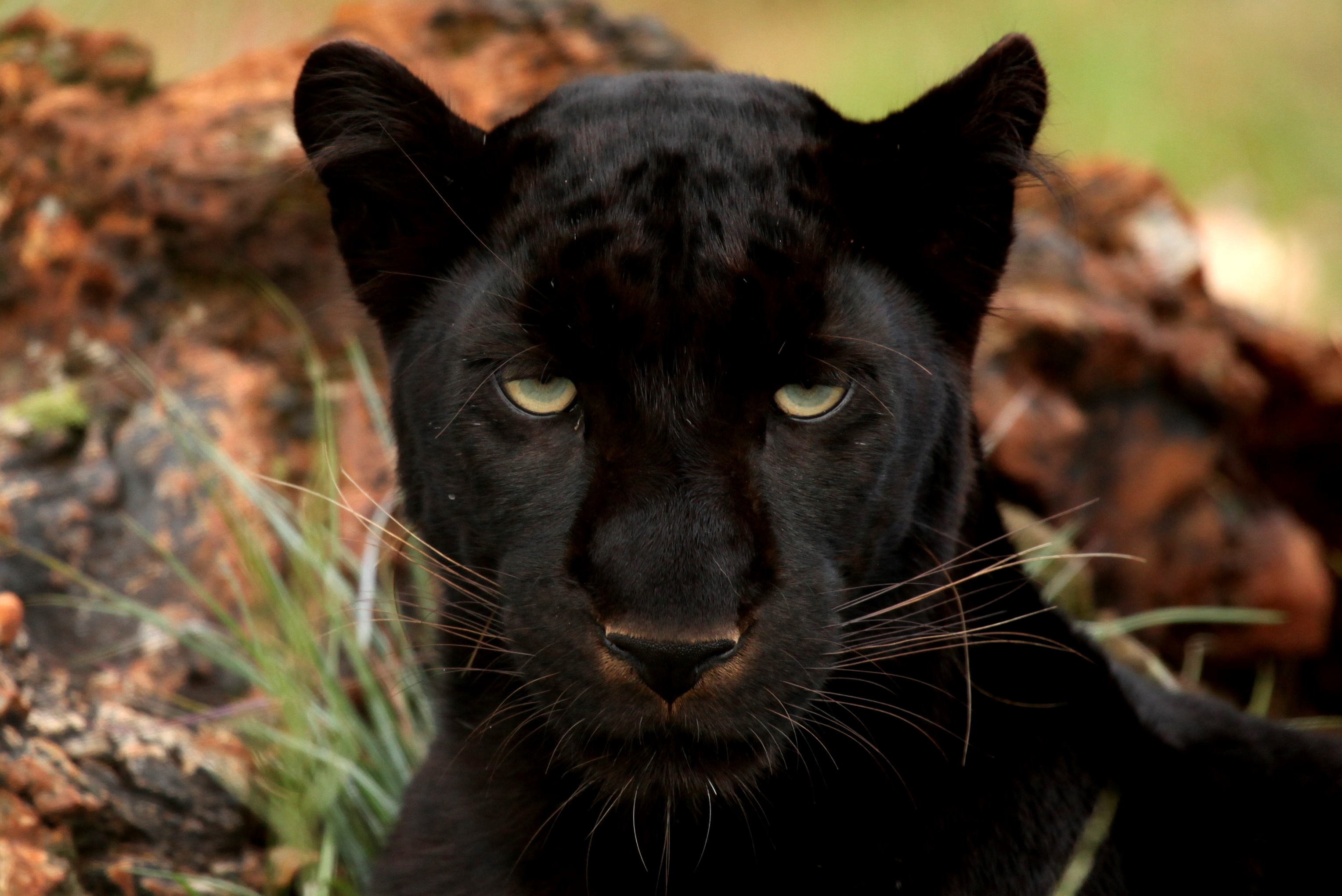
- A black panther in South Africa

Creature information
- Other name: Lithgow panther
- Folklore: Australian folklore

Origin
- Country: Australia
- Region: Blue Mountains

In Australian folklore, the Blue Mountains panther or Lithgow panther is a big cat said to exist by residents of the Blue Mountains area, west of Sydney, Australia, for over a century.

Theories suggest the animal may be a descendant of big cats released by World War II US soldiers, which had been used as military mascots. Alternatively, accounts of big cats released by travelling circuses, or which had escaped circuses, exist; as well as rumours that big cats were available for black market purchase in New South Wales in the 20th century.

== Notable sightings ==
Over 500 sightings in 20 years have been reported of the panther. The Grose Vale Group, which has collected reports of sightings since 1998, claims it collects 20 to 30 sightings a year.

In 2018, Grant Denyer and his wife, television producer Cheryl Rogers, reported they had sighted the cat on their property. Photographs have also been recorded in Gippsland and Hawkesbury. In 2002, a Kenthurst teenager Luke Walker was attacked by what he stated to be a large feline; he suffered deep lacerations. Sightings have been made by a NSW Police Force detective, an officer of the Department of Agriculture, and Rural Fire Service personnel, as well as pilots.

Encounters continue to be reported upon in national newspapers as of 2020, when video footage was allegedly recorded in the grounds of Sydney Adventist Hospital, Wahroonga. From 2021-2024, the Department of Primary Industries and Regional Development received nine reports of sightings or unusual feline footprints, including one sighting where a driver claimed to have seen a "giant jaguar" on the road.

In April 2020, the anonymous Instagram exploration collective Blue Mountains Explore claimed to have photographed alleged big cat tracks during a mountain trek. Blue Mountains Explore have subsequently continued to attempt to prove the existence of the panther, accruing a large social media following.

== Investigations ==
The NSW Department of Primary Industries (NPWS) has commissioned four reports into the phenomenon, in 1999, 2003, 2009 and 2013. In 1999, the head of the Department of Agriculture, Kevin Sheridan, wrote to the director-general of NPWS to request a report due to the large number of attacks. The first of these reports, by Doctor Johannes Bauer of NSW Agriculture concluded that it was likely true. As a result of the report, NSW Agriculture was ordered to send a tracker to identify the creature, but only sent an agricultural officer and a German shepherd.

In 2001, freedom of information requests revealed the NSW State government maintained an open file on big cat sightings at the time. Between 2001 and 2003, based on the study of scat and hair examples, the district veterinarian of the Moss Vale Rural Lands Protection Board concluded a big cat likely lived in the area. A 2003 report was opened by request of the Mayor of Hawkesbury Council and the Moss Vale Rural Lands Protection Board. The 2003 report concluded no conclusive evidence exists, but that it was more likely than not that such a cat existed.

In 2005, Bill Atkinson, the technical manager of NSW Agriculture, told the Sydney Morning Herald he was instructed not to speak on the subject. A representative of the City of Hawkesbury stated at the same time they had "genuine concern" about big cats in their area. In 2008, another report was commissioned which concluded the existence of a big cat population was "more likely than not", but it was subsequently edited before public release to change this conclusion, raising allegations of a cover up. In 2011, a pet alpaca was mauled to death in Bilpin; autopsy revealed 7cm puncture wounds to the skull. A report by the Hawkesbury area ranger concluded it may have been killed by a large cat.

A 2013 report was written by John Parkes, an invasive species expert, who concluded that there is no evidence of a big cat in the Blue Mountains. The author of the report later privately told the ABC they do believe it is possible a small population exists. Ray Williams, member of parliament for Hawkesbury, condemned the report as dismissive and dangerous.

The Grose Vale Group is one of several organisations that record accounts of the Lithgow panther.

== Popular culture ==
In 2024, Penrith Regional Gallery hosted an exhibition themed around the Penrith Panther, titled Spot the Difference, featuring 18 artists including Abdul-Rahman Abdullah and Blak Douglas.

== See also ==
- Phantom cat
- Gippsland phantom cat
