= Hunter (1984 Australian TV series) =

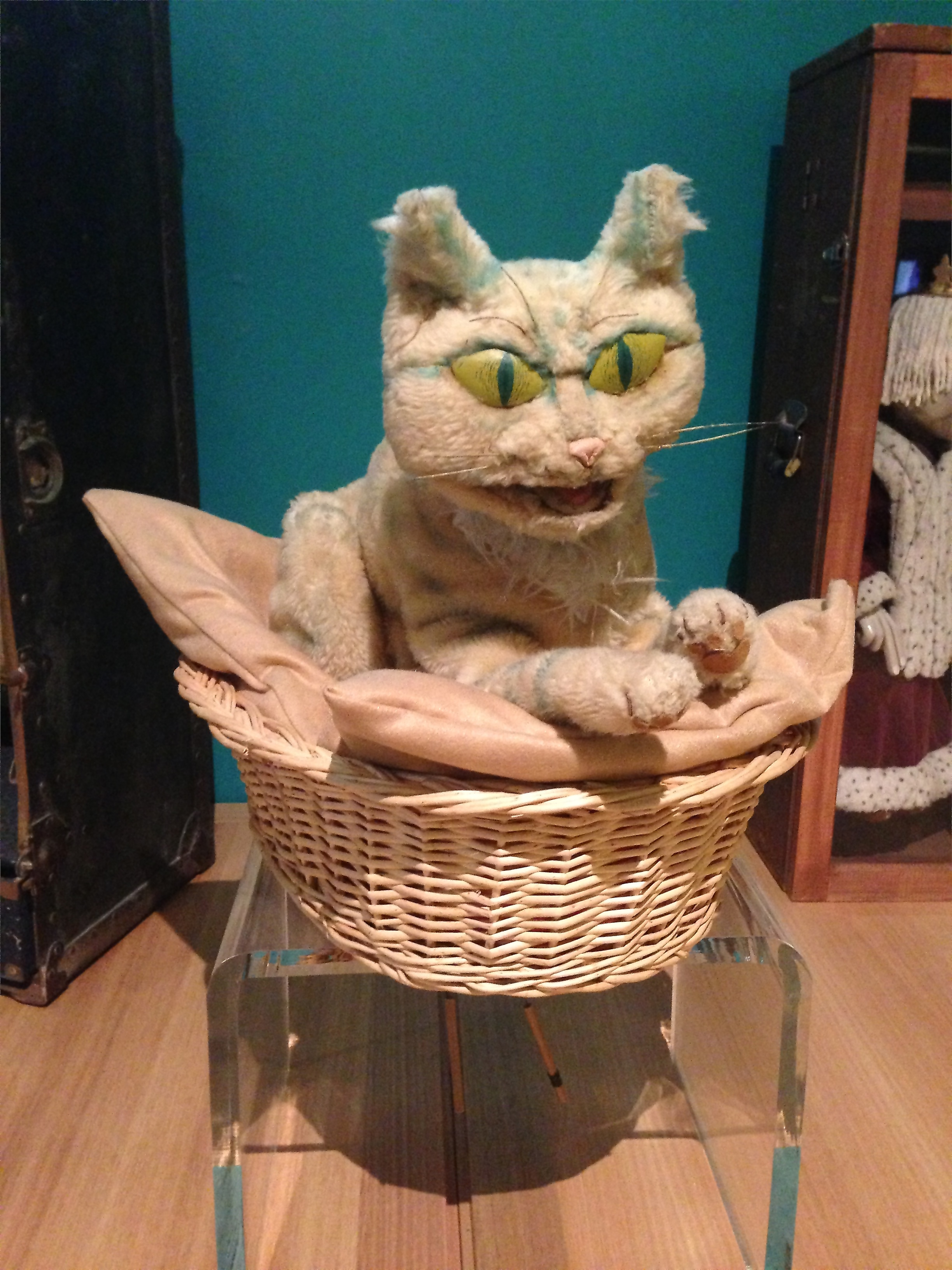
- The original CC puppet, on display in the Tasmanian Museum and Art Gallery
- Genre: Children's series
- Starring: Philip Sabine
- Voices of: Noreen Le Mottee
- Country of origin: Australia
- Original language: English
- No. of episodes: 24

Production
- Production locations: Hobart, Tasmania

Original release
- Network: ABC TV
- Release: 1984 – 1985

Hunter is an educational Australian children's television series that aired in the mid-1980s and early 1990s on the ABC. Twenty-four episodes were filmed and produced in Hobart, Tasmania, by ABC Hobart between 1984 and 1985, although the series was repeated often on ABC TV until 1992.

== Synopsis ==
The programme focused around a man, known as "Hunter", investigating, or "hunting" for information. His clothing was akin to an old English detective. Hunter's favored mode of transport was a bicycle adorned with a bright small triangular flag at the end of a pole. He was played by Philip Sabine.

His companions included "Computer Cat" (CC), represented by a puppet on the show (voiced by Hobart stage actress Noreen Le Mottee), and a mouse, represented by a live mouse named Albert, which often ran around in the brim of his hat. He was also occasionally joined on his adventures by his niece Minnie (played by Melissa Yard). CC was made by Jennifer Davidson, founder of Terrapin Puppet Theatre, which is based in Hobart.

The theme song to the show included the lyrics "What, why, where and when, that's Hunter!".

The Hunter show was watched by many Australian school children, often as part of their school curriculum, at primary-school level.

Philip Sabine, who played Hunter, still resides in Tasmania. He is known for drinking coffee from a scientific beaker, and his extended knowledge in a number of technical fields. Melissa Yard who played Mininie currently resides in Sydney.

In May 2012, it was revealed that Noreen and Philip had "rescued" Computer Cat from a practical joke at the conclusion of a party at the ABC Hobart office when the children's educational television unit closed. Noreen shared the story when she donated the real Computer Cat to the Tasmanian Museum and Art Gallery's puppet collection, where she joins Computer Cat's cousin, Sandy (who appeared in just one episode).

== Cast ==
- Philip Sabine as Hunter
- Noreen Le Mottee as Computer Cat
- Melissa Yard as Minnie
