= Winnie (feline) =

Supposed big cat sighted in the Veluwe region of the Netherlands

Faulhaber's photographic evidence

In 2005, Winnie was the name given to a supposed big cat sighted in the Veluwe region of the Netherlands.

== Sightings ==
At the beginning of June 2005, several sightings of a "puma" were reported to the police near Ede, Harskamp and Wekerom. Spoor was said to have been found. The police closed down a large part of the Ginkelse Heide while in search of the animal in order to shoot it, as they felt that a puma could be a threat to people living in the Veluwe area. However, no trace of the animal was found. An additional search for the animal was performed by the organization Pantera, but was also unsuccessful, although a further sighting was reported in September.

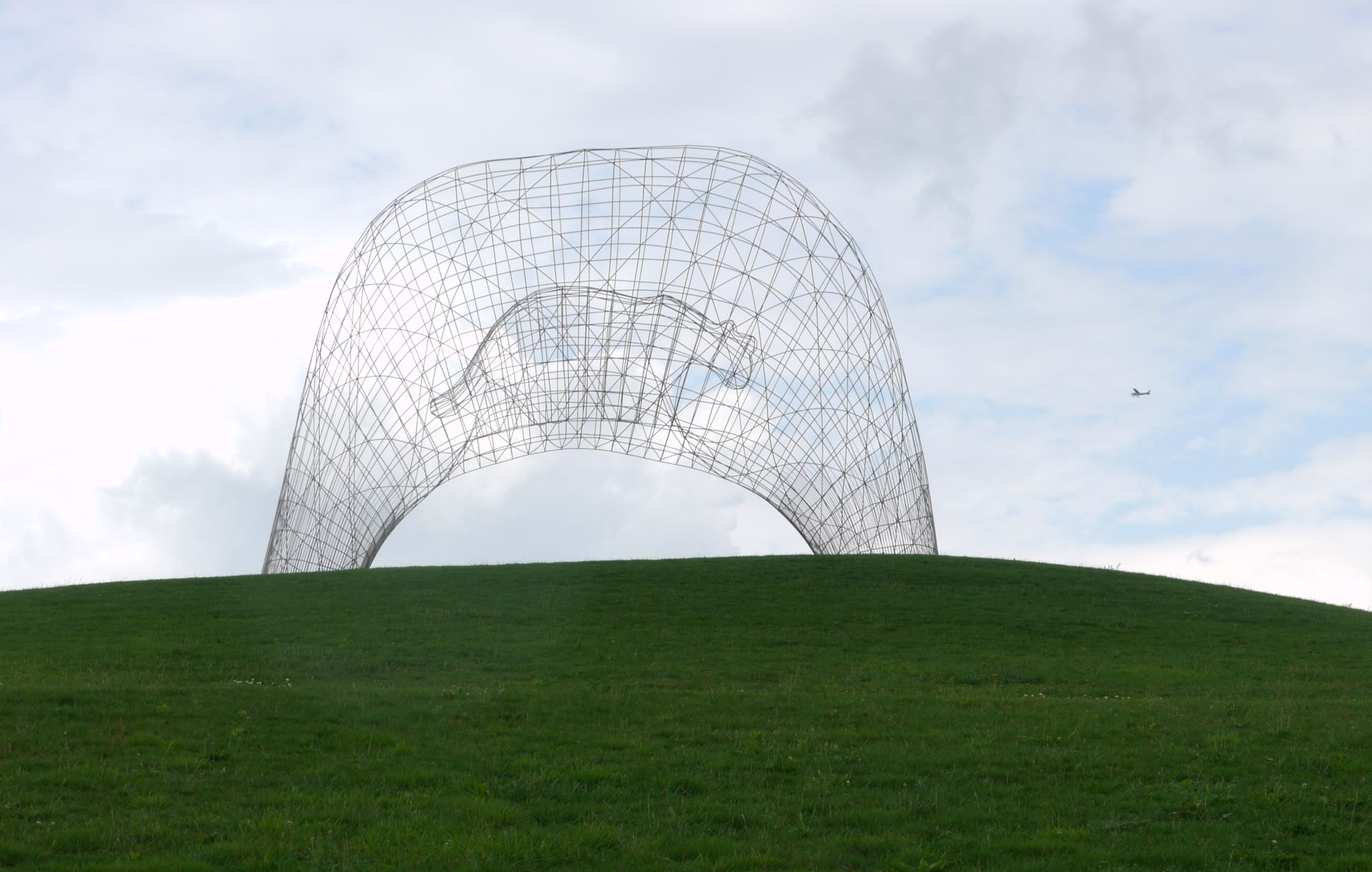
Cage With No Puma in It, sculpture by Maarten de Reus in Apeldoorn

== Explanation ==
On September 21, 2005, an analysis by biologist Gerrit Jansen of high-resolution photos taken by wildlife photographer Otto Faulhaber explained the supposed puma as being a cross-breed between a European wildcat and a typical housecat. The cat was 1.5 times as big as a normal house cat, which may have convinced those who saw it that they were looking at a species of big cat. European wildcats do not appear in the Netherlands in great numbers, but occasionally they can be seen.

== Sculpture ==
The story of Winnie inspired the Amsterdam artist Maarten de Reus to design a wire sculpture titled Kooi-met-geen-poema-er-in (Cage With No Puma in It), which was erected in a park in the Zuidbroek section of Apeldoorn. It was awarded the 2008 National Steel Prize and the 2009 National Building Prize.
