= List of macropodiformes =

Species in mammal suborder Macropodiformes

Macropodiformes is a suborder of Australian marsupial mammals. Members of this suborder are called macropodiformes, and include kangaroos, wallabies, bettongs, potoroos, and rat-kangaroos. Macropodiformes is one of three suborders that form the order Diprotodontia, the largest extant order of marsupials. They are found in Australia and New Guinea, generally in forests, shrublands, grasslands, and savannas, though some species can also be found in deserts and rocky areas. They range in size from the musky rat-kangaroo, at 20 cm (8 in) plus a 6 cm (2 in) tail, to the red kangaroo, at 160 cm (63 in) plus a 120 cm (47 in) tail. Macropodiformes primarily eat leaves, grass, ferns, and shrubs, as well as fruit and other plant material.

Many macropodiformes do not have population estimates, but the ones that do range from 40 individuals to 500,000. Ten species are categorized as endangered: Calaby's pademelon, Cape York rock-wallaby, dingiso, Goodfellow's tree-kangaroo, ifola, Matschie's tree-kangaroo, mountain pademelon, nabarlek, northern bettong, and Proserpine rock-wallaby. A further five species are categorized as critically endangered: the black dorcopsis, Gilbert's potoroo, golden-mantled tree-kangaroo, tenkile, and Wondiwoi tree-kangaroo. Nine species have gone extinct in the modern era, eight between the 1880s and the 1940s after the colonization of Australia began: the broad-faced potoroo, crescent nail-tail wallaby, desert bettong, desert rat-kangaroo, eastern hare-wallaby, Lake Mackay hare-wallaby, Nullarbor dwarf bettong, and toolache wallaby, and one in 2026, the woylie.

The seventy-two extant species of Macropodiformes are divided into three families: Hypsiprymnodontidae, containing a single species, the musky rat-kangaroo; Macropodidae, containing sixty-three species divided between the twelve genera in the subfamily Macropodinae and the single genus of the subfamily Sthenurinae; and Potoroidae, containing eight species in three extant genera. Dozens of extinct Macropodiformes species have been discovered, though due to ongoing research and discoveries the exact number and categorization is not fixed.

== Conventions ==
IUCN Red List categories
Conservation status
- EX: Extinct (9 species)
- EW: Extinct in the wild (0 species)
- CR: Critically endangered (5 species)
- EN: Endangered (10 species)
- VU: Vulnerable (16 species)
- NT: Near threatened (13 species)
- LC: Least concern (27 species)

The author citation for the species or genus is given after the scientific name; parentheses around the author citation indicate that this was not the original taxonomic placement. Conservation status codes listed follow the International Union for Conservation of Nature (IUCN) Red List of Threatened Species. Range maps are provided wherever possible; if a range map is not available, a description of the macropodiformes's range is provided. Ranges are based on the IUCN Red List for that species unless otherwise noted. All extinct genera, species, or subspecies listed alongside extant species went extinct after 1500 CE, and are indicated by a dagger symbol "†".

== Classification ==
The suborder Macropodiformes consists of three extant families: Hypsiprymnodontidae, Macropodidae, and Potoroidae. Hypsiprymnodontidae contains a single species and Potoroidae contains eight species in three extant genera. Macropodidae is divided into two subfamilies: Macropodinae, containing sixty-three species divided between twelve genera, and Sthenurinae, containing a single species. In addition to the extant species, eight species—four in Macropodidae and four in Potoroidae, including one extinct genus—have gone extinct in the modern era, all between the 1880s and the 1940s after the colonization of Australia began.

Family Hypsiprymnodontidae

- Genus Hypsiprymnodon (musky rat-kangaroo): one species

Family Macropodidae

- Subfamily Macropodinae
  - Genus Dendrolagus (tree-kangaroos): fourteen species
  - Genus Dorcopsis (dorcopsises): four species
  - Genus Dorcopsulus (forest wallabies): two species
  - Genus Lagorchestes (hare-wallabies): four species (two extinct)
  - Genus Macropus (grey kangaroos): two species
  - Genus Notamacropus (wallabies): eight species (one extinct)
  - Genus Osphranter (kangaroos): four species
  - Genus Onychogalea (nail-tail wallabies): three species (one extinct)
  - Genus Petrogale (rock-wallabies): sixteen species
  - Genus Setonix (quokka): one species
  - Genus Thylogale (pademelon): seven species
  - Genus Wallabia (swamp wallaby): one species
- Subfamily Sthenurinae
  - Genus Lagostrophus (banded hare-wallaby): one species

Family Potoroidae

- Genus Aepyprymnus (rufous rat-kangaroo): one species
- Genus Bettongia (bettongs): six species (three extinct)
- Genus Caloprymnus † (desert rat-kangaroo): one species (one extinct)
- Genus Potorous (potoroos): four species (one extinct)

- Macropodiformes
  - - Macropodidae
      - Macropodinae
        - - - - - Dendrolagus
                - Petrogale
              - Thylogale
            - - Dorcopsis
              - Dorcopsulus
          - - - - - - Notamacropus
                    - Wallabia
                  - Osphranter
                - Macropus
              - Lagorchestes
            - Setonix
        - Onychogalea
      - Sthenurinae
        Lagostrophus
    - Potoroidae
      - - Aepyprymnus
        - Bettongia
      - Potorous
  - - Hypsiprymnodontidae
      Hypsiprymnodon

== Macropodiformes ==
The following classification is based on the taxonomy described by the reference work Mammal Species of the World (2005), with augmentation by generally accepted proposals made since using molecular phylogenetic analysis, as supported by both the IUCN and the American Society of Mammalogists.

=== Hypsiprymnodontidae ===
Genus Hypsiprymnodon – Ramsay, 1876 – one species
Common name	Scientific name and subspecies	Range	Size and ecology	IUCN status and estimated population
Musky rat-kangaroo	H. moschatus Ramsay, 1876	Northeastern Australia	Size: 20–35 cm (8–14 in) long, plus 6–13 cm (2–5 in) tail Habitat: Forest Diet: Insects, as well as worms, tuberous roots, and palm berries	LC Unknown

=== Macropodidae ===
==== Subfamily Macropodinae ====
Genus Dendrolagus – Müller, 1840 – fourteen species
Common name	Scientific name and subspecies	Range	Size and ecology	IUCN status and estimated population
Bennett's tree-kangaroo	D. bennettianus Vis, 1887	Northeastern Australia	Size: 69–75 cm (27–30 in) long, plus 73–84 cm (29–33 in) tail Habitat: Forest Diet: Leaves and fruit	NT Unknown
Dingiso	D. mbaiso Flannery, Szalay & Boeadi, 1995	Western New Guinea	Size: 52–81 cm (20–32 in) long, plus 40–94 cm (16–37 in) tail Habitat: Forest and shrubland Diet: Leaves and fruit	EN Unknown
Doria's tree-kangaroo	D. dorianus Ramsay, 1883	Eastern New Guinea	Size: 41–81 cm (16–32 in) long, plus 40–94 cm (16–37 in) tail Habitat: Forest Diet: Leaves and fruit	VU Unknown
Golden-mantled tree-kangaroo	D. pulcherrimus Flannery, 1993	Northern New Guinea	Size: 41–81 cm (16–32 in) long, plus 40–94 cm (16–37 in) tail Habitat: Forest Diet: Leaves and fruit	CR 500
Goodfellow's tree-kangaroo	D. goodfellowi Thomas, 1906 Two subspecies: D. g. buergersi (Buergers' tree-kangaroo); D. g. goodfellowi	Eastern New Guinea	Size: 55–77 cm (22–30 in) long, plus 70–85 cm (28–33 in) tail Habitat: Forest Diet: Leaves, fruit, and cereals, as well as flowers and grass	EN Unknown
Grizzled tree-kangaroo	D. inustus Müller, 1840 Two subspecies: D. i. finschi; D. i. inustus	Western and northern New Guinea	Size: 41–81 cm (16–32 in) long, plus 40–94 cm (16–37 in) tail Habitat: Forest Diet: Leaves, fruit, and bark	VU Unknown
Ifola	D. notatus Matschie, 1916	Eastern New Guinea	Size: 41–81 cm (16–32 in) long, plus 40–94 cm (16–37 in) tail Habitat: Forest Diet: Leaves and fruit	EN Unknown
Lowlands tree-kangaroo	D. spadix Troughton & Le Souef, 1936	Eastern New Guinea	Size: 41–81 cm (16–32 in) long, plus 40–94 cm (16–37 in) tail Habitat: Forest Diet: Leaves and fruit	VU Unknown
Lumholtz's tree-kangaroo	D. lumholtzi Collett, 1884	Northeastern Australia	Size: 41–81 cm (16–32 in) long, plus 40–94 cm (16–37 in) tail Habitat: Forest Diet: A variety of leaves as well as flowers	NT 10,000–30,000
Matschie's tree-kangaroo	D. matschiei Rothschild & Förster, 1907	Eastern New Guinea	Size: 55–63 cm (22–25 in) long, plus 55–63 cm (22–25 in) tail Habitat: Forest Diet: Leaves, as well as fruit, flowers, nuts, insects, bark, sap, bird eggs, and young birds	EN 2,500
Seri's tree-kangaroo	D. stellarum Flannery & Seri, 1990	Central New Guinea	Size: 41–81 cm (16–32 in) long, plus 40–94 cm (16–37 in) tail Habitat: Forest Diet: Leaves and fruit	VU Unknown
Tenkile	D. scottae Flannery, 1990	Northern New Guinea	Size: 41–81 cm (16–32 in) long, plus 40–94 cm (16–37 in) tail Habitat: Forest Diet: Tree leaves, ferns, and soft vines	CR 200
Ursine tree-kangaroo	D. ursinus (Temminck, 1836)	Western New Guinea	Size: 41–81 cm (16–32 in) long, plus 40–94 cm (16–37 in) tail Habitat: Forest Diet: Leaves and fruit	VU Unknown
Wondiwoi tree-kangaroo	D. mayri Rothschild & Dollman, 1933	Western New Guinea	Size: 41–81 cm (16–32 in) long, plus 40–94 cm (16–37 in) tail Habitat: Forest Diet: Leaves and fruit	CR 40

Genus Dorcopsis – Schlegel & Müller, 1842 – four species
Common name	Scientific name and subspecies	Range	Size and ecology	IUCN status and estimated population
Black dorcopsis	D. atrata Deusen, 1957	Eastern New Guinea	Size: 73–100 cm (29–39 in) long, plus 28–40 cm (11–16 in) tail Habitat: Forest Diet: Leaves, roots, grass and fruit	CR Unknown
Brown dorcopsis	D. muelleri (Lesson, 1827) Four subspecies: D. m. lorentzii; D. m. muelleri; D. m. mysoliae; D. m. yapeni	Western New Guinea	Size: 34–97 cm (13–38 in) long, plus 27–55 cm (11–22 in) tail Habitat: Forest Diet: Roots, leaves, grass, and fruit	LC Unknown
Gray dorcopsis	D. luctuosa (D'Albertis, 1874) Two subspecies: D. l. luctuosa; D. l. phyllis	Southern New Guinea	Size: 34–97 cm (13–38 in) long, plus 27–55 cm (11–22 in) tail Habitat: Forest Diet: Roots, leaves, grass, and fruit	VU Unknown
White-striped dorcopsis	D. hageni Heller, 1897	Northern New Guinea	Size: 34–97 cm (13–38 in) long, plus 27–55 cm (11–22 in) tail Habitat: Forest Diet: Roots, leaves, grass, and fruit	LC Unknown

Genus Dorcopsulus – Matschie, 1916 – two species
Common name	Scientific name and subspecies	Range	Size and ecology	IUCN status and estimated population
Macleay's dorcopsis	D. macleayi (Miklouho-Maclay, 1885)	Eastern New Guinea	Size: 31–46 cm (12–18 in) long, plus 22–41 cm (9–16 in) tail Habitat: Forest Diet: Leaves, buds, and stems	LC Unknown
Small dorcopsis	D. vanheurni (Thomas, 1922)	Central and eastern New Guinea	Size: 31–46 cm (12–18 in) long, plus 22–41 cm (9–16 in) tail Habitat: Forest Diet: Believed to be leaves and fruit	NT Unknown

Genus Lagorchestes – Gould, 1841 – four species
Common name	Scientific name and subspecies	Range	Size and ecology	IUCN status and estimated population
Eastern hare-wallaby †	L. leporides Gould, 1841	Southeastern Australia	Size: About 45 cm (18 in) long, plus 32 cm (13 in) tail Habitat: Unknown Diet: Unknown	EX 0
Lake Mackay hare-wallaby †	L. asomatus Finlayson, 1943	Central Australia	Size: Unknown Habitat: Desert Diet: Unknown	EX 0
Rufous hare-wallaby	L. hirsutus Gould, 1844	Western Australia	Size: 31–39 cm (12–15 in) long, plus 24–31 cm (9–12 in) tail Habitat: Shrubland, grassland Diet: Seeds, fruit, grass, sedges, and succulent shrubs and herbs	NT 6,000
Spectacled hare-wallaby	L. conspicillatus Gould, 1842	Northern Australia	Size: 39–49 cm (15–19 in) long, plus 37–53 cm (15–21 in) tail Habitat: Forest, savanna, shrubland, and grassland Diet: Grass, forbs, and herbs	LC Unknown

Genus Macropus – Shaw, 1790 – two species
Common name	Scientific name and subspecies	Range	Size and ecology	IUCN status and estimated population
Eastern grey kangaroo	M. giganteus Shaw, 1790 Two subspecies: M. g. giganteus; M. g. tasmaniensis (Forester Kangaroo)	Eastern Australia	Size: 85–140 cm (33–55 in) long, plus 75–100 cm (30–39 in) tail Habitat: Forest, savanna, shrubland, and grassland Diet: Grass, as well as forbs	LC Unknown
Western grey kangaroo	M. fuliginosus (Desmarest, 1817) Three subspecies: M. f. fuliginosus (Kangaroo Island western grey kangaroos); M. f. melanops; M. f. ocydromus	Southern and southwestern Australia	Size: 85–140 cm (33–55 in) long, plus 75–100 cm (30–39 in) tail Habitat: Forest, savanna, shrubland, and grassland Diet: Grass, forbs, leaves, tree bark, and shrubs	LC Unknown

Genus Notamacropus – Dawson & Flannery, 1985 – eight species
Common name	Scientific name and subspecies	Range	Size and ecology	IUCN status and estimated population
Agile wallaby	N. agilis (Gould, 1842) Four subspecies: N. a. agilis; N. a. jardinii; N. a. nigrescens; N. a. papuanus	Northern Australia and southern New Guinea	Size: 40–105 cm (16–41 in) long, plus 33–75 cm (13–30 in) tail Habitat: Savanna and grassland Diet: Grass, shrubs, bushes, and roots, as well as leaves and fruit	LC Unknown
Black-striped wallaby	N. dorsalis (Gray, 1837)	Northeastern Australia	Size: 40–105 cm (16–41 in) long, plus 33–75 cm (13–30 in) tail Habitat: Forest, savanna, and shrubland Diet: Grass, as well as forbs and shrubs	LC Unknown
Parma wallaby	N. parma (Waterhouse, 1846)	Eastern Australia	Size: 44–53 cm (17–21 in) long, plus 40–55 cm (16–22 in) tail Habitat: Forest Diet: Grass and herbs	VU 8,000
Red-necked wallaby	N. rufogriseus (Desmarest, 1817) Three subspecies: N. r. banksianus (red-necked wallaby); N. r. fruticus; N. r. rufogriseus (Bennett's wallaby)	Eastern and southeastern Australia	Size: 92–105 cm (36–41 in) long, plus 70–75 cm (28–30 in) tail Habitat: Forest, shrubland, and grassland Diet: Grass and herbs, as well as roots	LC Unknown
Tammar wallaby	N. eugenii (Desmarest, 1817)	Southern and southwestern Australia	Size: 52–68 cm (20–27 in) long, plus 33–45 cm (13–18 in) tail Habitat: Forest and shrubland Diet: Grass as well as shrubs	LC 10,000–50,000
Toolache wallaby †	N. greyi Waterhouse, 1846	Southern Australia	Size: 40–105 cm (16–41 in) long, plus 33–75 cm (13–30 in) tail Habitat: Savanna and grassland Diet: Grass, leaves, and roots	EX 0
Western brush wallaby	N. irma (Jourdan, 1837)	Southwestern Australia	Size: 40–105 cm (16–41 in) long, plus 33–75 cm (13–30 in) tail Habitat: Forest, savanna, and shrubland Diet: Grass	LC 10,000–50,000
Whiptail wallaby	N. parryi (Bennett, 1835)	Northeastern Australia	Size: 40–105 cm (16–41 in) long, plus 33–75 cm (13–30 in) tail Habitat: Savanna Diet: Grass, ferns, and herbs	LC Unknown

Genus Osphranter – Shaw, 1790 – four species
Common name	Scientific name and subspecies	Range	Size and ecology	IUCN status and estimated population
Antilopine kangaroo	O. antilopinus Gould, 1842	Northern Australia	Size: 75–140 cm (30–55 in) long, plus 60–90 cm (24–35 in) tail Habitat: Forest, savanna, and grassland Diet: Grass	LC Unknown
Black wallaroo	O. bernardus (Rothschild, 1904)	Northern Australia	Size: About 73 cm (29 in) long, plus 64 cm (25 in) tail Habitat: Forest, shrubland, and grassland Diet: Grass and shrubs, as well as other plants	NT Unknown
Common wallaroo	O. robustus (Gould, 1841) Four subspecies: O. r. erubescens (western wallaroo); O. r. isabellinus (Barrow Island wallaroo); O. r. robustus (eastern wallaroo); O. r. woodwardi (Kimberley wallaroo)	Australia	Size: 75–140 cm (30–55 in) long, plus 60–90 cm (24–35 in) tail Habitat: Forest, savanna, shrubland, and grassland Diet: Grasses and shrubs	LC Unknown
Red kangaroo	O. rufus (Desmarest, 1822)	Australia	Size: 85–160 cm (33–63 in) long, plus 65–120 cm (26–47 in) tail Habitat: Savanna, shrubland, grassland, and desert Diet: Grass and flowering plants	LC Unknown

Genus Onychogalea – Gray, 1841 – three species
Common name	Scientific name and subspecies	Range	Size and ecology	IUCN status and estimated population
Bridled nail-tail wallaby	O. fraenata Gould, 1841	Scattered eastern Australia	Size: 43–70 cm (17–28 in) long, plus 36–73 cm (14–29 in) tail Habitat: Forest, savanna, and shrubland Diet: Variety of forbs, grass, and shrubs	VU 800–1,100
Crescent nail-tail wallaby †	O. lunata (Gould, 1841)	Western Australia	Size: 37–51 cm (15–20 in) long, plus 15–33 cm (6–13 in) tail Habitat: Savanna and grassland Diet: Unknown	EX 0
Northern nail-tail wallaby	O. unguifera (Gould, 1841)	Scattered northern Australia	Size: 43–70 cm (17–28 in) long, plus 36–73 cm (14–29 in) tail Habitat: Forest, savanna, and shrubland Diet: Herbs, succulents, fruit, and grass	LC Unknown

Genus Petrogale – Gray, 1837 – sixteen species
Common name	Scientific name and subspecies	Range	Size and ecology	IUCN status and estimated population
Allied rock-wallaby	P. assimilis Ramsay, 1877	Northeastern Australia	Size: 40–70 cm (16–28 in) long, plus 30–70 cm (12–28 in) tail Habitat: Rocky areas Diet: Grass, leaves, forbs, fruit, flowers, seeds	LC Unknown
Black-flanked rock-wallaby	P. lateralis Gould, 1842 Three subspecies: P. l. hacketti (Recherche rock-wallaby); P. l. lateralis (warru); P. l. pearsoni (Pearson Island rock-wallaby)	Scattered central and western Australia	Size: 40–70 cm (16–28 in) long, plus 30–70 cm (12–28 in) tail Habitat: Savanna, shrubland, grassland, rocky areas, and desert Diet: Grass, leaves, forbs, fruit, flowers, seeds	VU 8,000
Brush-tailed rock-wallaby	P. penicillata Gray, 1827	Eastern Australia	Size: 40–70 cm (16–28 in) long, plus 30–70 cm (12–28 in) tail Habitat: Forest, savanna, and rocky areas Diet: Grass, as well as leaves, sedges, ferns, roots, bark, fruit, seeds and flowers	VU 20,000
Cape York rock-wallaby	P. coenensis Eldridge & Close, 1992	Northern Australia	Size: 40–70 cm (16–28 in) long, plus 30–70 cm (12–28 in) tail Habitat: Forest and rocky areas Diet: Grass, leaves, forbs, fruit, flowers, seeds	EN 500–2,000
Godman's rock-wallaby	P. godmani Thomas, 1923	Northern Australia	Size: 40–70 cm (16–28 in) long, plus 30–70 cm (12–28 in) tail Habitat: Rocky areas Diet: Grass, leaves, forbs, fruit, flowers, seeds	NT 10,000
Herbert's rock-wallaby	P. herberti Thomas, 1926	Eastern Australia	Size: 40–70 cm (16–28 in) long, plus 30–70 cm (12–28 in) tail Habitat: Rocky areas Diet: Grass, leaves, forbs, fruit, flowers, seeds	LC Unknown
Mareeba rock-wallaby	P. mareeba Eldridge & Close, 1992	Northern Australia	Size: 40–70 cm (16–28 in) long, plus 30–70 cm (12–28 in) tail Habitat: Rocky areas Diet: Grass, leaves, forbs, fruit, flowers, seeds	NT 10,000
Monjon	P. burbidgei Kitchener, 1978	Northwestern Australia	Size: 29–36 cm (11–14 in) long, plus 25–33 cm (10–13 in) tail Habitat: Forest and rocky areas Diet: Grass, leaves, forbs, fruit, flowers, seeds	NT Unknown
Mount Claro rock-wallaby	P. sharmani Eldridge & Close, 1992	Northern Australia	Size: 29–36 cm (11–14 in) long, plus 25–33 cm (10–13 in) tail Habitat: Rocky areas Diet: Grass, leaves, forbs, fruit, flowers, seeds	VU 750
Nabarlek	P. concinna Gould, 1842	Northwestern Australia	Size: 29–35 cm (11–14 in) long, plus 22–31 cm (9–12 in) tail Habitat: Forest, savanna, grassland, and rocky areas Diet: Grass and ferns	EN 5,000–10,000
Proserpine rock-wallaby	P. persephone Maynes, 1982	Northeastern Australia	Size: 40–70 cm (16–28 in) long, plus 30–70 cm (12–28 in) tail Habitat: Forest and rocky areas Diet: Grass and leaves, as well as shrubs, forbs, and fungi	EN Unknown
Purple-necked rock-wallaby	P. purpureicollis Le Souef, 1924	North central Australia	Size: 40–70 cm (16–28 in) long, plus 30–70 cm (12–28 in) tail Habitat: Rocky areas Diet: Grass, leaves, forbs, fruit, flowers, seeds	NT 10,000
Rothschild's rock-wallaby	P. rothschildi Thomas, 1904	Northwestern Australia	Size: 40–70 cm (16–28 in) long, plus 30–70 cm (12–28 in) tail Habitat: Rocky areas Diet: Grass, leaves, forbs, fruit, flowers, seeds	LC Unknown
Short-eared rock-wallaby	P. brachyotis (Gould, 1841)	Northern Australia	Size: 40–70 cm (16–28 in) long, plus 30–70 cm (12–28 in) tail Habitat: Forest, savanna, and rocky areas Diet: Grass, as well as bark and roots	LC 10,000–50,000
Unadorned rock-wallaby	P. inornata Gould, 1842	Northeastern Australia	Size: 40–70 cm (16–28 in) long, plus 30–70 cm (12–28 in) tail Habitat: Rocky areas Diet: Grass, leaves, forbs, fruit, flowers, seeds	LC Unknown
Yellow-footed rock-wallaby	P. xanthopus Gray, 1855 Two subspecies: P. x. celeris; P. x. xanthopus	South central Australia	Size: 48–65 cm (19–26 in) long, plus 57–70 cm (22–28 in) tail Habitat: Rocky areas Diet: Grass and leaves	NT Unknown

Genus Setonix – Lesson, 1842 – one species
Common name	Scientific name and subspecies	Range	Size and ecology	IUCN status and estimated population
Quokka	S. brachyurus (Quoy & Gaimard, 1830)	Southwestern Australia	Size: 39–60 cm (15–24 in) long, plus 23–35 cm (9–14 in) tail Habitat: Forest, shrubland, and inland wetlands Diet: Succulents, shrubs, forbs, grasses and sedges, as well as seeds, berries, and fruit	VU 7,500–20,000

Genus Thylogale – Gray, 1837 – seven species
Common name	Scientific name and subspecies	Range	Size and ecology	IUCN status and estimated population
Brown's pademelon	T. browni (Ramsay, 1877)	Eastern New Guinea (introduced in red)	Size: 29–67 cm (11–26 in) long, plus 24–57 cm (9–22 in) tail Habitat: Forest Diet: Grass, leaves, shoots, seeds, and fruit	VU Unknown
Calaby's pademelon	T. calabyi Flannery, 1992	Scattered eastern New Guinea	Size: 29–67 cm (11–26 in) long, plus 24–57 cm (9–22 in) tail Habitat: Grassland Diet: Grass, leaves, shoots, seeds, and fruit	EN Unknown
Dusky pademelon	T. brunii (Schreber, 1778)	Southern New Guinea (introduced in red)	Size: 29–67 cm (11–26 in) long, plus 24–57 cm (9–22 in) tail Habitat: Forest and savanna Diet: Grass, leaves, shoots, seeds, and fruit	VU Unknown
Mountain pademelon	T. lanatus Thomas, 1922	Eastern New Guinea	Size: 29–67 cm (11–26 in) long, plus 24–57 cm (9–22 in) tail Habitat: Forest and grassland Diet: Grass, leaves, shoots, seeds, and fruit	EN Unknown
Red-legged pademelon	T. stigmatica (Gould, 1860) Four subspecies: T. s. coxenii; T. s. oriomo; T. s. stigmatica; T. s. wilcoxi	Eastern Australia and southern New Guinea	Size: 38–54 cm (15–21 in) long, plus 30–48 cm (12–19 in) tail Habitat: Forest Diet: Leaves and fruit, as well as grass, bark, fungi, and cicadas	LC Unknown
Red-necked pademelon	T. thetis (Lesson, 1828)	Eastern Australia	Size: 29–63 cm (11–25 in) long, plus 27–51 cm (11–20 in) tail Habitat: Forest Diet: Grass, leaves, shoots, seeds, and fruit	LC Unknown
Tasmanian pademelon	T. billardierii (Desmarest, 1822)	Tasmania	Size: 29–67 cm (11–26 in) long, plus 24–57 cm (9–22 in) tail Habitat: Forest, shrubland, and grassland Diet: Grass, leaves, shoots, seeds, and fruit	LC Unknown

Genus Wallabia – Trouessart, 1905 – one species
Common name	Scientific name and subspecies	Range	Size and ecology	IUCN status and estimated population
Swamp wallaby	W. bicolor (Desmarest, 1804)	Eastern Australia	Size: 66–85 cm (26–33 in) long, plus 64–87 cm (25–34 in) tail Habitat: Forest and shrubland Diet: Buds, ferns, leaves, shrubs, and grasses, as well as bark and shoots from needle-leaf trees	LC Unknown

==== Subfamily Sthenurinae ====
Genus Lagostrophus – Thomas, 1887 – one species
Common name	Scientific name and subspecies	Range	Size and ecology	IUCN status and estimated population
Banded hare-wallaby	L. fasciatus (Péron & Lesueur, 1807) Two subspecies: L. f. baudinettei; L. f. fasciatus	Western Australia	Size: 40–46 cm (16–18 in) long, plus 32–40 cm (13–16 in) tail Habitat: Shrubland Diet: Plants and fruit	VU 14,000

=== Potoroidae ===
Genus Aepyprymnus – Garrod, 1875 – one species
Common name	Scientific name and subspecies	Range	Size and ecology	IUCN status and estimated population
Rufous rat-kangaroo	A. rufescens (Gray, 1837)	Northeastern Australia	Size: 37–52 cm (15–20 in) long, plus 35–40 cm (14–16 in) tail Habitat: Forest and savanna Diet: Grass, herbs, roots, tubers, and fungi, as well as carrion bones and larvae	LC Unknown

Genus Bettongia – Gray, 1837 – six species
Common name	Scientific name and subspecies	Range	Size and ecology	IUCN status and estimated population
Boodie	B. lesueur (Quoy & Gaimard, 1824)	Scattered western and southern Australia	Size: 37–40 cm (15–16 in) long, plus about 30 cm (12 in) tail Habitat: Forest, savanna, shrubland, and desert Diet: Leaves, seeds, fruits, nuts, tubers, bulbs, flowers, and fungi, as well as termites and marine carrion	NT 13,500
Desert bettong †	B. anhydra Finlayson, 1957	Central Australia	Size: Unknown Habitat: Unknown Diet: Unknown	EX 0
Eastern bettong	B. gaimardi (Desmarest, 1822)	Eastern Tasmania	Size: 32–33 cm (13–13 in) long, plus 32–33 cm (13–13 in) tail Habitat: Forest Diet: Fungi, as well as plants	NT 20,000–50,000
Northern bettong	B. tropica Wakefield, 1967	Northeastern Australia	Size: 27–44 cm (11–17 in) long, plus 26–35 cm (10–14 in) tail Habitat: Forest Diet: Fungi, as well as roots, tubers, small invertebrates, and seeds	EN 800–1,600
Nullarbor dwarf bettong †	B. pusilla McNamara, 1997	Southern Australia	Size: Unknown Habitat: Unknown Diet: Unknown	EX 0
Woylie†	B. penicillata (Gray, 1837)	Scattered western and southern Australia (form distribution in yellow)	Size: 30–38 cm (12–15 in) long, plus 29–36 cm (11–14 in) tail Habitat: Forest and shrubland Diet: Fungi, as well as bulbs, tubers, seeds, insects and resin	EX 0

Genus Caloprymnus † – Thomas, 1888 – one species
Common name	Scientific name and subspecies	Range	Size and ecology	IUCN status and estimated population
Desert rat-kangaroo †	C. campestris (Gould, 1843)	Central Australia	Size: 25–29 cm (10–11 in) long, plus 29–38 cm (11–15 in) tail Habitat: Desert Diet: Leaves and stems, as well as insects	EX 0

Genus Potorous – Desmarest, 1804 – four species
Common name	Scientific name and subspecies	Range	Size and ecology	IUCN status and estimated population
Broad-faced potoroo †	P. platyops (Gould, 1844)	Southwestern Australia	Size: 24–42 cm (9–17 in) long, plus 19–33 cm (7–13 in) tail Habitat: Inland wetlands Diet: Fungi, grass, roots, and other vegetation	EX 0
Gilbert's potoroo	P. gilbertii (Gould, 1841)	Southwestern Australia	Size: 24–42 cm (9–17 in) long, plus 19–33 cm (7–13 in) tail Habitat: Shrubland Diet: Believed to be roots and fungi	CR 50
Long-footed potoroo	P. longipes Seebeck & Johnston, 1980	Southeastern Australia	Size: 24–42 cm (9–17 in) long, plus 19–33 cm (7–13 in) tail Habitat: Forest and shrubland Diet: Fungi, as well as insects, seeds, and plants	VU 10,000–50,000
Long-nosed potoroo	P. tridactylus (Kerr, 1792) Two subspecies: P. t. apicalis; P. t. tridactylus	Southeastern Australia and Tasmania	Size: 24–42 cm (9–17 in) long, plus 19–33 cm (7–13 in) tail Habitat: Forest and shrubland Diet: Fungi, insects, grass, roots, and other vegetation	NT 75,000

== Sources ==
- Pattiselanno, Freddy; Koibur, Juohan F.; Arobaya, Agustina Y. S. (2020). Dabek, Lisa; Valentine, Peter; Blessington, Jacque; Schwartz, Karin R. (eds.). Tree Kangaroos: Science and Conservation. Elsevier. ISBN 978-0-12-814675-0.
- Menkhorst, Peter; Knight, Frank (2011). A Field Guide to the Mammals of Australia (3rd ed.). Oxford University Press. ISBN 978-0-19-557395-4.
- Nowak, Ronald M. (2018). Walker's Mammals of the World. Vol. Monotremes, Marsupials, Afrotherians, Xenarthrans, and Sundatherians. Johns Hopkins University Press. ISBN 978-1-4214-2468-2.
- Nowak, Ronald M. (2005). Walker's Marsupials of the World. Johns Hopkins University Press. ISBN 978-0-8018-8222-7.
- Richardson, Ken (2012). Australia's Amazing Kangaroos: Their Conservation, Unique Biology and Coexistence with Humans. CSIRO Publishing. ISBN 978-0-643-09739-1.
- Strahan, Ronald (1995). Mammals of Australia. Smithsonian Institution. ISBN 978-1-56098-673-7.
- Taylor, Barbara (2022). The Magnificent Book of Extinct Animals. Weldon Owen. ISBN 978-1-68188-737-1.
- Groves, Colin P. (2005). Wilson, Don E.; Reeder, DeeAnn M. (eds.). Mammal Species of the World. Vol. 1 (3rd ed.). Johns Hopkins University Press. ISBN 978-0-8018-8221-0.
