= Wondiwoi tree-kangaroo =

- Illustration from the 1936 Rothschild and Dollman monograph 'The Genus Dendrolagus'

Conservation status
- Critically endangered, possibly extinct (IUCN 3.1)

Scientific classification
- Kingdom: Animalia
- Phylum: Chordata
- Class: Mammalia
- Infraclass: Marsupialia
- Order: Diprotodontia
- Family: Macropodidae
- Genus: Dendrolagus
- Species: D. mayri

Binomial name
- Dendrolagus mayri Rothschild & Dollman, 1933
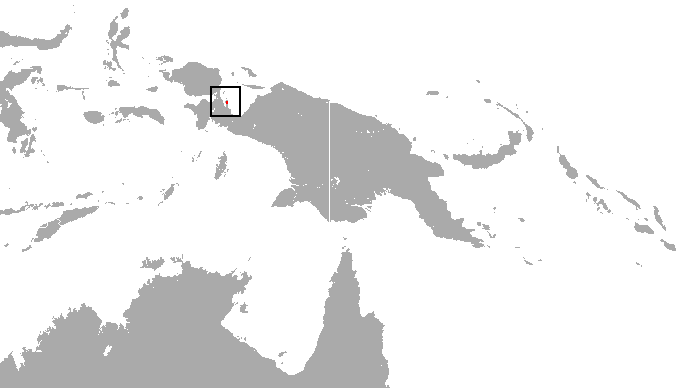
- Wondiwoi Tree Kangaroo Range Map

Species of marsupial

The Wondiwoi tree-kangaroo (Dendrolagus mayri) is a critically endangered, bear-like mammal native to tropical mountain forests on the island of New Guinea in Western Papua. Elusive and rare, it was considered extinct until rediscovery in 2018. It is a species of tree-kangaroo (genus Dendrolagus), a group of long-tailed, bear-like animals native to Australia and New Guinea that mostly live in trees and feed on plant matter. Tree-kangaroos belong to the macropod family (Macropodidae) with kangaroos, and carry their young in a pouch like most other marsupials. The Wondiwoi tree-kangaroo is likely threatened by hunting, and is known only from remote mountains on the Wondiwoi Peninsula in northwest New Guinea.

Until 2018, the wondiwoi tree-kangaroo was known only from a single specimen collected in 1928.

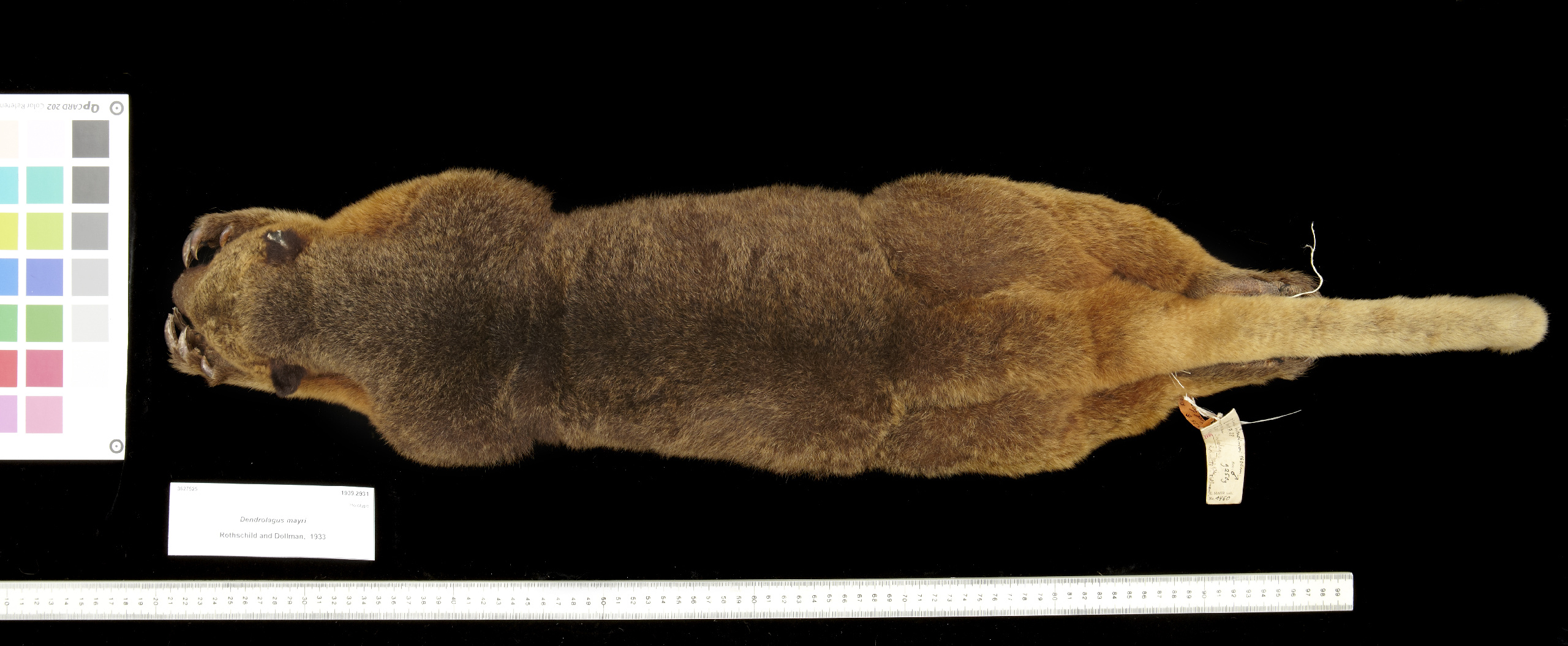
Taxidermied Wondiwoi tree-kangaroo specimen collected in 1928

The only known specimen is a male weighing 9.25 kilograms (20.4 lb). D. mayri was located in the Wondiwoi Peninsula of West Papua at an elevation of 1,600 metres (5,200 ft) within montane rain forest. It is thought that the Wondiwoi tree-kangaroo could occupy an area of 300 square kilometres (120 sq mi). Re:wild, the global conservation organization, listed the Wondiwoi tree-kangaroo as one of their "25 most wanted lost species".

== Taxonomy ==
It was named in honour of Ernst Mayr, who collected the type specimen now deposited in the Natural History Museum, London. It was described by Lord Rothschild and Capt. Guy Dollman in a 1933 paper and an illustration based on the only known specimen was published in their 1936 monograph on the genus.

== Discovery ==
In July 2018, the first known photographs of the species were taken by British naturalist Michael Smith. Smith was investigating Vireya rhododendrons in an unexplored area of the Wondiwoi ranges and photographed a "dorianus type" tree kangaroo at an altitude of approximately 1,600 metres. Scent marks, tree kangaroo scat and claw marks at the base of trees made by climbing tree kangaroos were found from 1,700 m to 2,000 m in steep montane forest. Local hunters, who frequently kill grizzled tree-kangaroos in lowland forest, rarely visit the forest above 1,500 m because of the difficult terrain, lack of water sources and dense bamboo thickets. An expert-led monograph on the genus discusses this "first photograph of a living animal" and asks "What other novel observations are out in the cloud forests of New Guinea?":

While this has raised hopes that this species, previously considered most likely extinct, continues to survive in these remote areas, it also highlights the prospect that other species in similarly remote areas are awaiting rediscovery and protection.

— Lisa Dabek, Peter Valentine, Jacqueline Jo Blessington, Karin R. Schwartz (Editors), Tree Kangaroos: Science and Conservation (Biodiversity of the World: Conservation from Genes to Landscapes)

== Status ==
Long thought to be extinct or critically endangered, the IUCN Red List listed the species as critically endangered (possibly extinct) because "if the species still exists the population must be very small (less than 50 mature individuals) and probably in decline due to hunting pressures. Although the area has not been well-sampled, there have been a few visits to the area with no reports of this species."

The species status of Dendrolagus mayri is uncertain. Some authorities refer to all 'dorianus type' tree kangaroos as subspecies of Doria's tree kangaroo, including Colin Groves, who published a major revision of the taxonomy of the genus in 1982. More recent DNA analysis indicates, however, that the members of the dorianus group deserve species status, although Dendrolagus mayri itself was not included in the study.

== Threats and conservation efforts ==
With the recent rediscovery of this species in 2018, the Wondiwoi tree-kangaroo faces concerns regarding its conservation status. Like most other species of tree-kangaroos, the Wondiwoi is likely threatened by hunting and habitat loss. The latter may be more indicative of its disappearance in the early 1930s as it seemingly migrated to higher altitudes where ecosystems are less disturbed.

As the elusiveness of this species is cause for debate on whether it is critically endangered or extinct, most conservation efforts should align similarly to other tree-kangaroos and attempt to reintroduce this species into a broader range. The Tree Kangaroo Conservation Program (TKCP) involves local communities and researchers communicating to effectively preserve tree-kangaroos while understanding the culture and traditions of the indigenous people. While this organization primarily focuses on the Matschie's tree-kangaroos in the Huon peninsula, similar strategies can occur in the Wondiwoi peninsula. Although the mountain forests in this peninsula are remote, hunting can still be a big concern, due to the rarity of this species, which requires these areas to be safeguarded.

Since the Wondiwoi tree-kangaroo's current population is unknown and assumed to be extremely low, a genetic rescue procedure may have to be considered. While it is up for debate whether the Wondiwoi tree-kangaroo is its own species or a subspecies of Doria's tree-kangaroo, introducing a genetically similar relative to the Wondiwoi Peninsula population could aid in increasing it. This will also increase genetic diversity if the population has a small number of individuals and may be suffering from inbreeding depression.
