= Seri's tree-kangaroo =

Conservation status
- Vulnerable (IUCN 3.1)

Scientific classification
- Kingdom: Animalia
- Phylum: Chordata
- Class: Mammalia
- Infraclass: Marsupialia
- Order: Diprotodontia
- Family: Macropodidae
- Genus: Dendrolagus
- Species: D. stellarum

Binomial name
- Dendrolagus stellarum Flannery & Seri, 1990
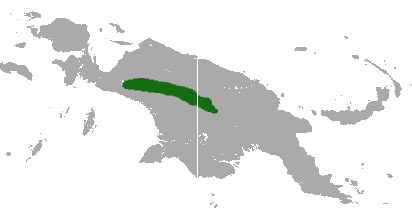
- Seri's tree-kangaroo range

Species of mammal

Seri's tree-kangaroo (Dendrolagus stellarum) is a species of tree-kangaroo native and endemic to montane forests of west-central New Guinea. Seri's tree-kangaroo was originally considered to be a subspecies of Dendrolagus dorianus, but was elevated to species in 2005 by Groves.

== Distribution ==
Its elevational distribution is rather different from that of the other related species, in that it descends no lower than about 2600 metres. The forest becomes less mossy and more diverse, below this elevation. It is not clear why it is restricted to such high elevations, unlike the closely related Ifola (Dendrolagus notatus) which descends to much lower elevations.

== Description ==
"Seri's tree-kangaroo is one of the most attractive members of the Doria's complex. Very young animals have a bright yellow tail and a very dark body, but as they age the tail darkens and the distinctive silvery tipping develops on the limbs. The heavily silver-frosted coat colour of adults blends extraordinarily well with the epiphytic mosses and lichens of the upper montane forest."
