= Tenkile =

Conservation status
- Critically Endangered (IUCN 3.1)

Scientific classification
- Kingdom: Animalia
- Phylum: Chordata
- Class: Mammalia
- Infraclass: Marsupialia
- Order: Diprotodontia
- Family: Macropodidae
- Genus: Dendrolagus
- Species: D. scottae

Binomial name
- Dendrolagus scottae Flannery & Seri, 1990
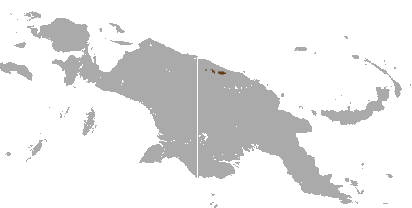
- Tenkile range

Species of marsupial

The tenkile (Dendrolagus scottae), also known as Scott's tree-kangaroo, is a species of tree-kangaroo in the family Macropodidae. It is endemic to a very small area of the Torricelli Mountains of Papua New Guinea. Its natural habitat is subtropical or tropical dry forests. It is threatened by habitat loss and by hunting.

The tenkile is listed as endangered due to hunting and logging activities in Papua New Guinea. The tenkile is hunted for its meat, and has been a main protein source for the local tribespeople. The local human population has increased in recent years, increasing demand for tenkile meat. Additionally, tenkiles are poached for their fur and are captured and sold as a part of the illegal pet trade. Domesticated dogs also hunt tenkiles. Deforestation in Papua New Guinea affects all tree-kangaroos, and industrial logging that occurs in the Torricelli Mountain Range decreases the species' already restricted habitat. The Torricelli Mountain Range faces additional deforestation due to the timber industry, and the production of coffee, rice and wheat.

== Description ==
The tenkile is a close relative of Doria's tree-kangaroo. It weighs 9 to 11 kilograms (20 to 24 lb), with males being larger than females. It is predominantly black with some chocolate-brown on its limbs and long tail, and whorls of hair on the shoulders. It has a powerful and persistent odour. Tenkiles have a noticeably long snout, and are able to both hop and walk bipedally. They are also able to raise their arms above their head, which most kangaroo species cannot. It is believed that this species breeds year round, with one offspring born each year. The young become independent after two years. The tenkile is believed to be the most intelligent of all tree-kangaroo species.

In series 2 of BBC TV’s Wilderness with Simon Reeve released in the United Kingdom in September 2026, Tenkile are filmed in their native habitat in the Torricelli mountains. It is claimed to be the first professionally filmed footage of Tenkile in the wild.

== Habitat ==
Tenkiles have a very limited habitat. They are found at about 900–1,700 metres (3,000–5,600 ft) above sea level in the Torricelli Mountain Range. Their total habitat does not exceed 125 square kilometres (48 sq mi). The tenkile inhabits mid-montane rainforests predominated by Podocarpus, Libocedrus, Araucaria and Rapanea.

== Diet ==
Unlike other tree-kangaroos, which are partially frugivorous, they are mainly herbivores; their known diet comprises epiphytic ferns, green leafy material and vines including Scaevola and Tetracera. However, focussed studies have not been conducted on the species' diet. Currently, research is being compiled from the knowledge of the local people and a collection of the animal's specific diet is being prepared. Tenkiles have been known to look for their food either in the treetops or on the ground.

== Reproduction ==
The exact nature of reproduction is still being studied, however it is currently believed that they reproduce year round. This would imply that there is no breeding season and females are free to mate as they please. Reproduction is thought to occur slowly with a single new offspring thought to be born once a year. A young tree kangaroo is referred to as a joey, as is the case with all kangaroos. The gestation period for this extract species is currently unknown, but other tree kangaroos have a period of approximately 30 days; therefore, a similar period is expected for the tenkile. Parental care is carried out by the females though the exact involvement of the males is unknown. Groups of a male, female, and young have been observed but so have groups of only female and young. Newborns are carried in the mother pouch until they are old enough to leave, which can last up to a year. After being born the young will spend two years with its mother before becoming independent.

The species' slow reproduction rate may increase its extinction risk. It was thought that the tenkile population could have been as low as 100 individuals in 2001. The low number of individuals meant a lower number of individuals to choose from when mating. The slow reproduction rate would also mean that it simply takes longer to replace lost individuals or increase the population.

== Social interaction ==
Most accounts of tenkile social interaction in the wild has been recorded by locals in Papua New Guinea. When the tenkile was first discovered, most locals recount seeing the tenkile travelling in packs of four, comprising a male, female and offspring, but now most sightings of tenkiles in the wild are individual. This is most likely the result of the decline in population over recent years. Not much is known about their options for communications, but it is believed that they use all available senses to communicate with each other. These senses include: vision, hearing, chemical cues and touch. Tenkiles have not been known to be hostile to humans and usually stay away from human activity while they are up in the trees.

== Status ==
Tenkiles have declined greatly over the past 50 years, including an 80% decline in ten years. It is currently restricted to three remote areas along the summit of the Torricelli Range, the eastern Bewani Range, the Menawa Range, and the Torricelli Mountains in the Fatima area of Papua New Guinea where it is found at altitudes between 900 and 1,700 metres (3,000 and 5,600 ft) above sea level. The animal is hunted by indigenous people for food and the sub-population in the Torricelli Mountains is believed to number fewer than 250 individuals. The International Union for Conservation of Nature has assessed the animal's status as being "critically endangered" and a moratorium on hunting has been arranged with the local community in the Swelpini area.

== Conservation ==
The main group concerned with the preservation of the tenkile in Papua New Guinea is the Tenkile Conservation Alliance (TCA), which is a group established as a part of the World Association of Zoos and Aquariums (WAZA) in 2001. The group's main aim is to protect the biodiversity in Papua New Guinea and make the Torricelli Mountain Range, in northwestern Papua New Guinea, a protected area. The TCA works with communities living in and around the tenkile's habitat through community outreach which includes school visits to teach the younger children about the species. TCA have been able to get 50 villages to join the hunting moratorium that helps in the conservation efforts of not only the Tenkile but also the Weimang/ Golden Tree Kangaroo. The culture of the residents of the Papua New Guinea towards the tenkile has changed, as TCA has been able to substitute the consumption of rabbits, fish and imported meat with the consumption of the tenkile. As stated above, the tenkile faces extinction due to hunting, mainly hunting for its meat. This change has led to a decrease in the hunting of the tenkile for over ten years.

Another conservation program implemented in Papua New Guinea in 2000 is the WWF Forest Program (PNG or FoNG), which aims to increase the biodiversity through community outreach programs. The program also plans on contacting the government and other non-governmental organisations to support various conservation efforts and create conservation models that can be implemented across Papua New Guinea.
