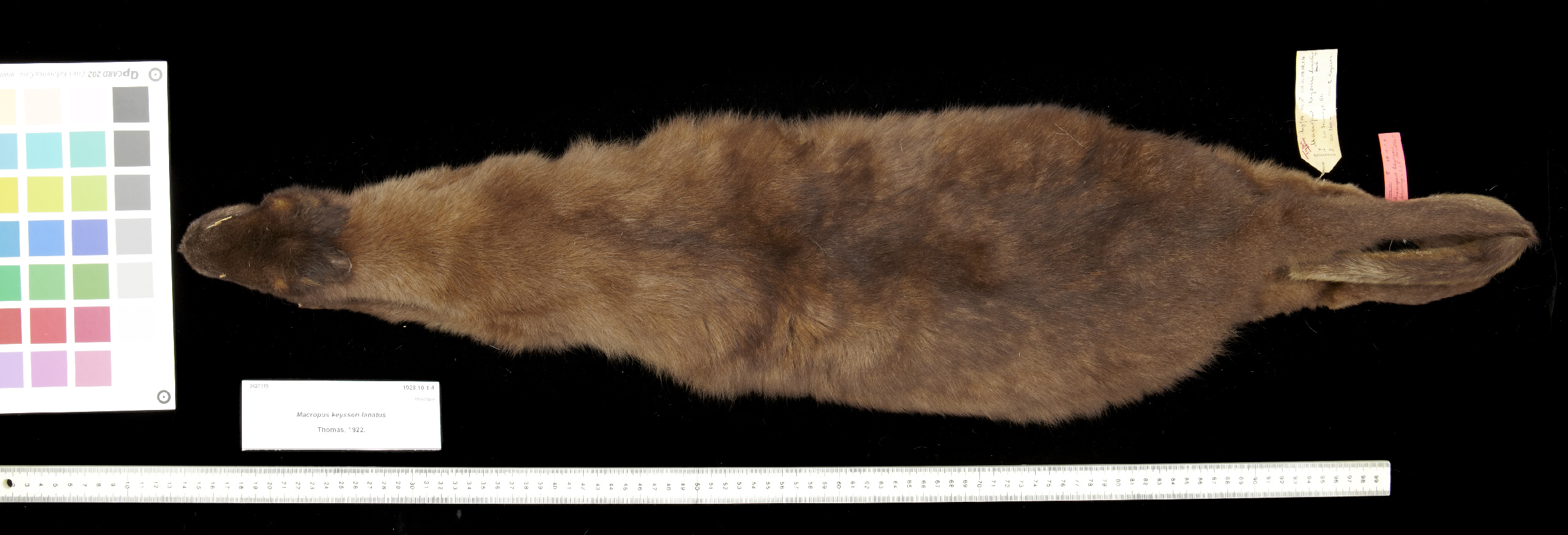

Conservation status
- Endangered (IUCN 3.1)

Scientific classification
- Kingdom: Animalia
- Phylum: Chordata
- Class: Mammalia
- Infraclass: Marsupialia
- Order: Diprotodontia
- Family: Macropodidae
- Genus: Thylogale
- Species: T. lanatus

Binomial name
- Thylogale lanatus (Thomas, 1922)
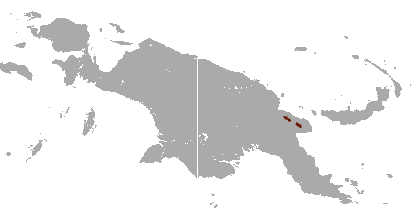
- Mountain pademelon range

= Mountain pademelon =

Species of marsupial

The mountain pademelon (Thylogale lanatus) is one of seven species of the genus Thylogale. It is found only in Papua New Guinea.
