= Lowlands tree-kangaroo =

Conservation status
- Vulnerable (IUCN 3.1)

Scientific classification
- Kingdom: Animalia
- Phylum: Chordata
- Class: Mammalia
- Infraclass: Marsupialia
- Order: Diprotodontia
- Family: Macropodidae
- Genus: Dendrolagus
- Species: D. spadix

Binomial name
- Dendrolagus spadix Troughton & Le Souef, 1936
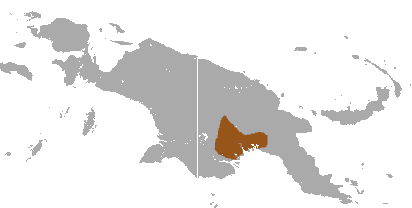
- Lowlands tree-kangaroo range

Species of marsupial

The lowlands tree-kangaroo (Dendrolagus spadix), also spelt "lowland," is a long-tailed, furry, bear-like mammal found only in lowland tropical rainforests on the island of New Guinea (in Papua New Guinea). It is a species of tree-kangaroo (genus Dendrolagus), which are tree-dwelling animals that feed on leaves or other plant matter. Tree-kangaroos are in the macropod family (Macropodidae) with kangaroos, and like other marsupials they carry their young in a pouch. The lowlands tree-kangaroo is threatened by habitat loss.

The species is endemic to the Southern New Guinea lowland rainforests ecoregion in the southwestern part of New Guinea, within the nation of Papua New Guinea.

== See also ==
- Endemic fauna of Papua New Guinea
- Marsupials of Oceania
