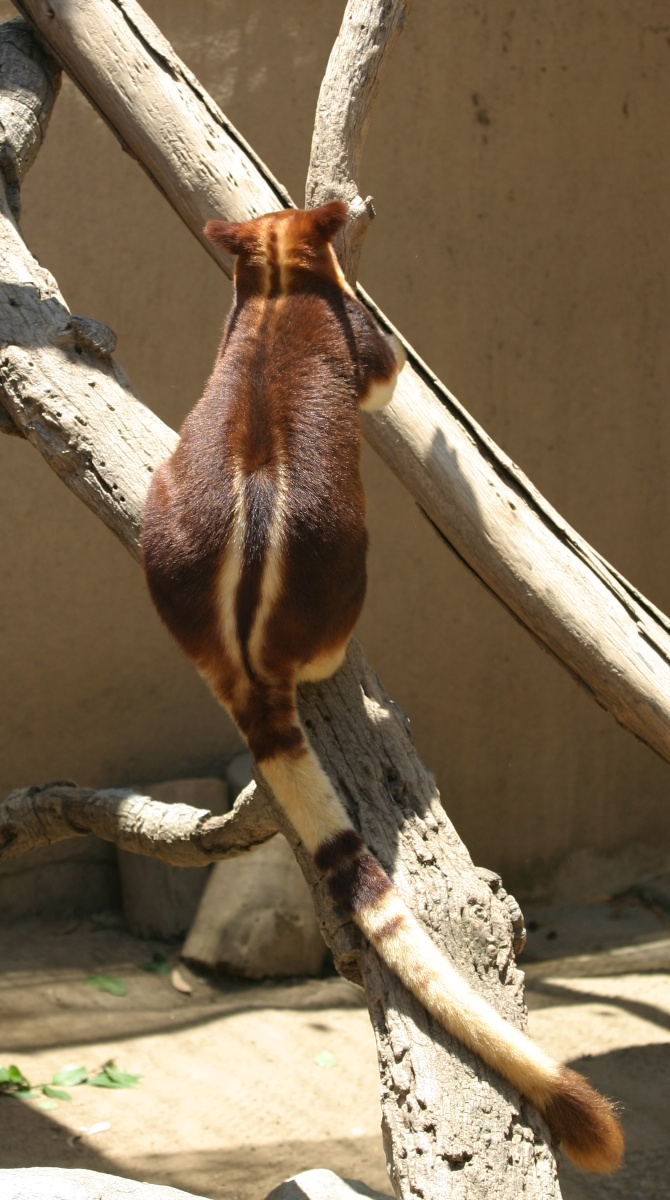

Scientific classification
- Kingdom: Animalia
- Phylum: Chordata
- Class: Mammalia
- Infraclass: Marsupialia
- Order: Diprotodontia
- Family: Macropodidae
- Genus: Dendrolagus
- Species: D. goodfellowi
- Subspecies: D. g. buergersi

Trinomial name
- Dendrolagus goodfellowi buergersi Matschie, 1912

= Buergers' tree-kangaroo =

Subspecies of marsupial

The Buergers' tree-kangaroo (Dendrolagus goodfellowi buergersi) is a subspecies of the Goodfellow's tree-kangaroo from Papua New Guinea, where they dwell mainly in tropical rainforests. Their diet consists of mostly leaves and fruit, which they find both in trees and on the ground.

It is believed tree-kangaroos evolved from creatures similar to modern kangaroos and wallabies. The ancestors of all kangaroos are thought to be small marsupials that look like present-day opossums.

Tree-kangaroos have developed long tails for balancing in the trees, and strong forelimbs for climbing. Their teeth are developed for tearing leaves rather than cutting grass.

The Buergers' tree-kangaroo, along with nine other species of tree-kangaroo, are endangered and on the brink of extinction. The key threats to their survival include dwindling habitat due to logging; mining; road kill by humans and predation by domestic and wild dogs.

== Gallery ==
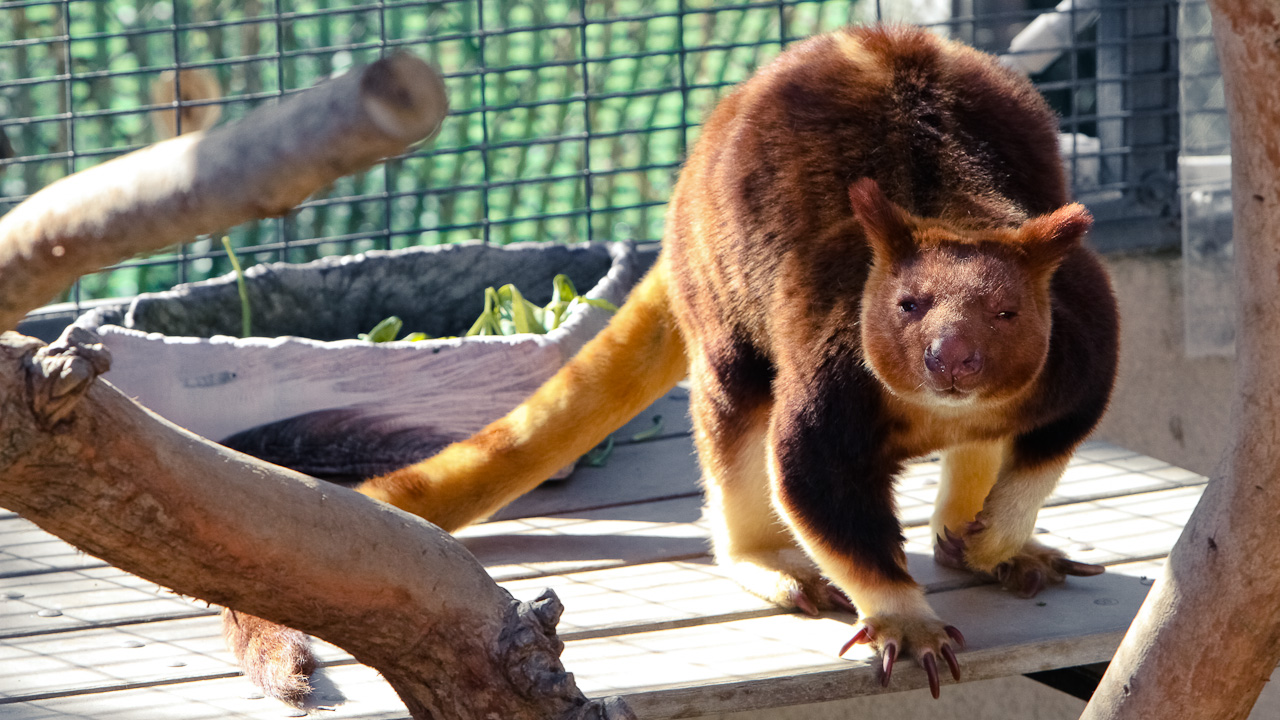

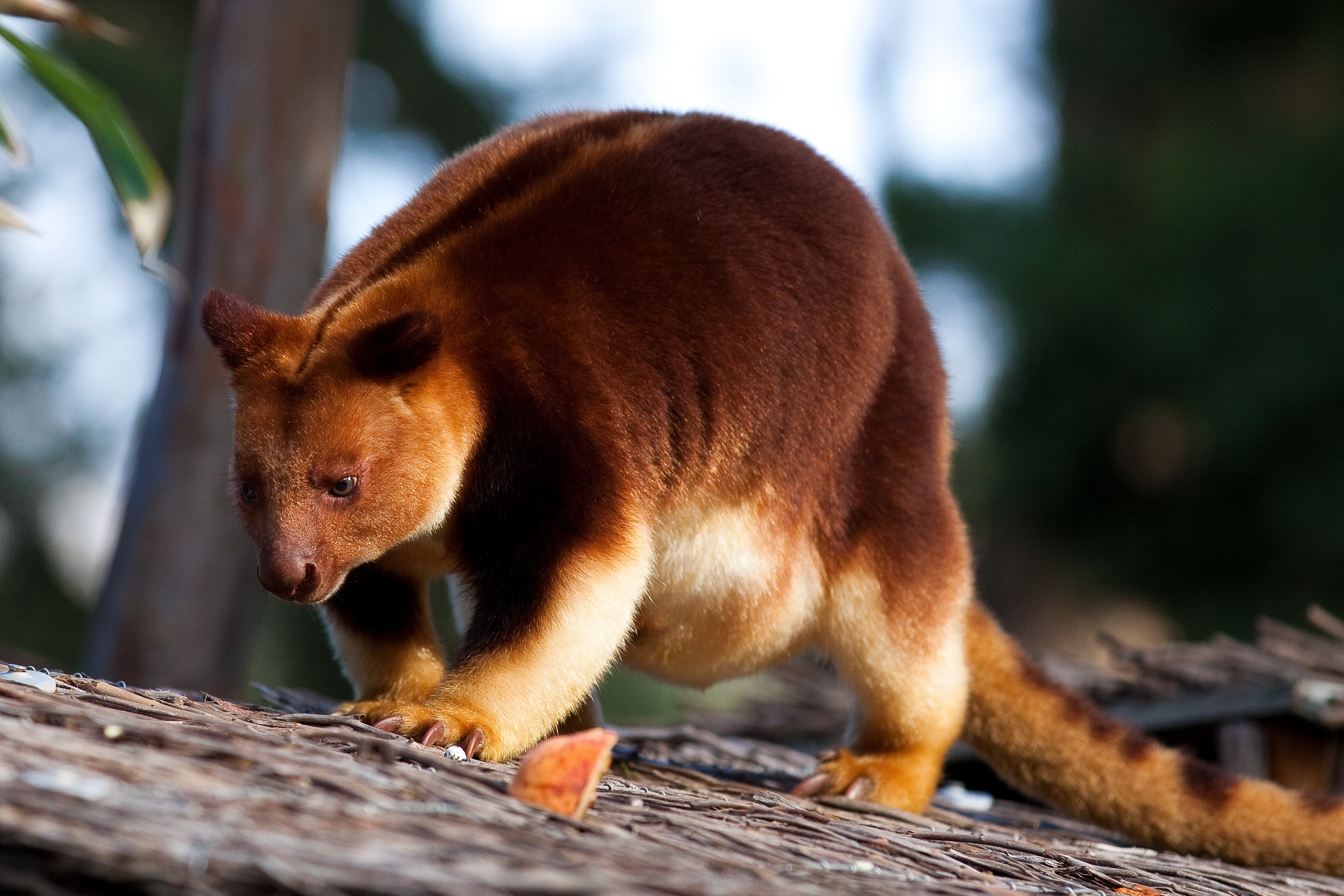

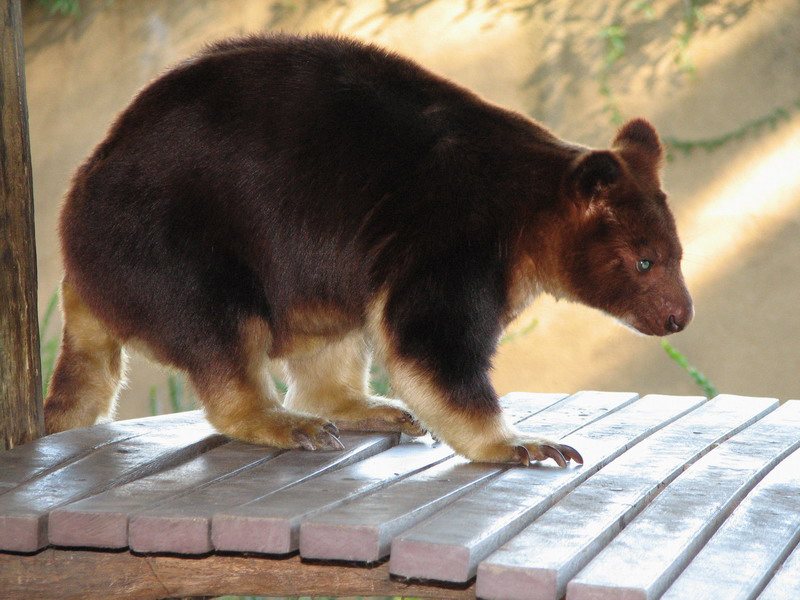

== See also ==
- Fauna of New Guinea
