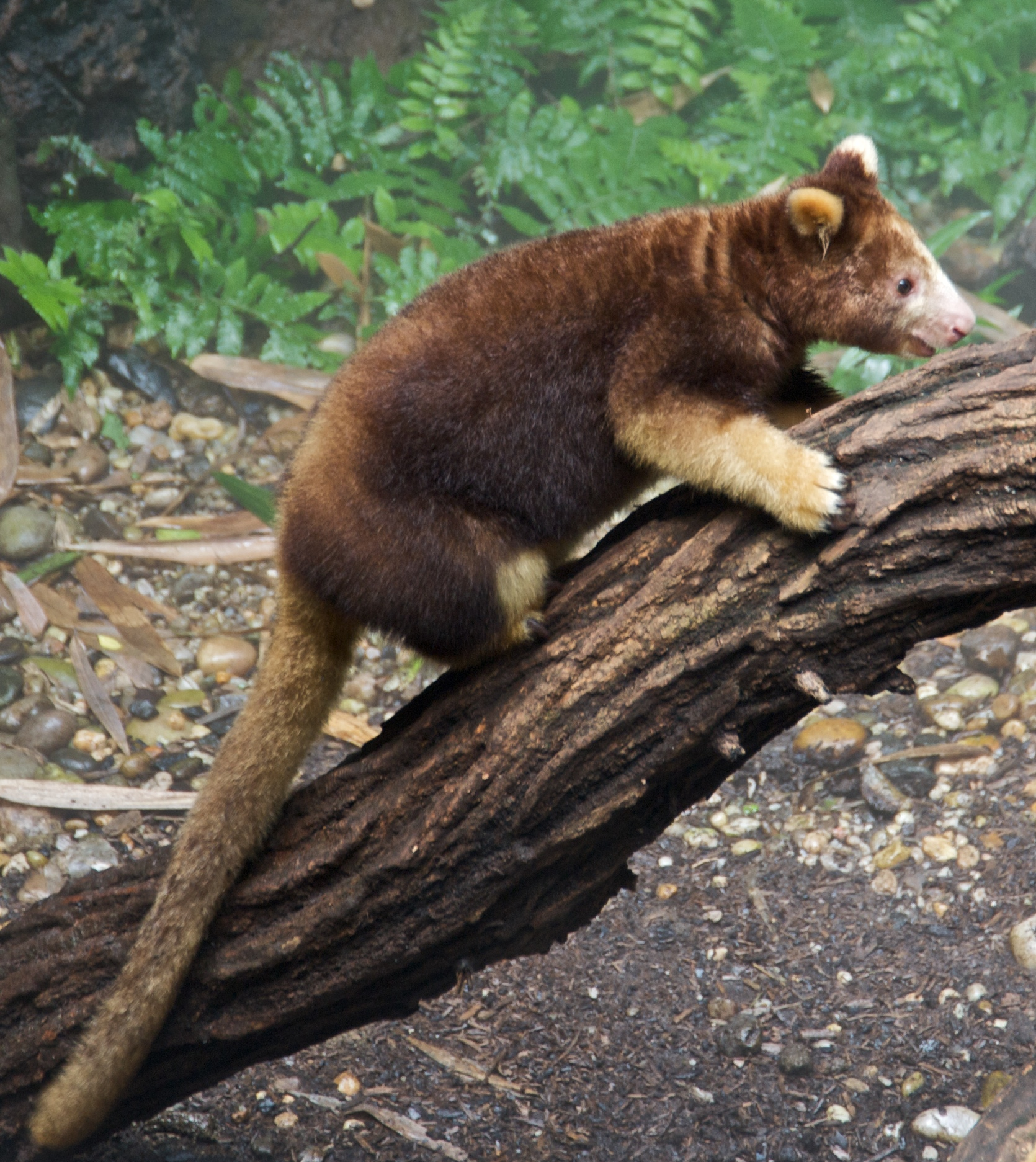
- Matschie's tree-kangaroo (Dendrolagus matschiei)

Scientific classification
- Kingdom: Animalia
- Phylum: Chordata
- Class: Mammalia
- Infraclass: Marsupialia
- Order: Diprotodontia
- Family: Macropodidae
- Subfamily: Macropodinae
- Genus: Dendrolagus; S. Müller, 1840

Type species
- Dendrolagus ursinus S. Müller, 1840

Species
- About 14; see text
- Distribution map

= Tree-kangaroo =

Tree-kangaroo Temporal range: Pliocene–Recent

Genus of marsupials

Tree-kangaroos are marsupials of the genus Dendrolagus, adapted for arboreal locomotion. They inhabit the tropical rainforests of New Guinea and far northeastern Queensland, Australia, along with some of the islands in the region. Most species of tree-kangaroo are considered threatened due to hunting and habitat destruction. They are the only true arboreal macropods.

== Evolutionary history ==
The evolutionary history of tree-kangaroos possibly begins with a rainforest floor-dwelling pademelon-like ancestor. This ancestor possibly evolved from an arboreal possum-like ancestor as is suspected of all macropodid marsupials in Australia and New Guinea. During the late Eocene, the Australian/New Guinean continent began a period of drying that caused a retreat in the area of rainforest, which forced the ancestral pademelons to begin living in a drier, rockier environment. After some generations of adaptation to the new environment, the pademelons may have evolved into rock-wallabies (Petrogale spp.), which developed a generalist feeding strategy due to their dependence on a diverse assortment of vegetation refuges. This generalist strategy allowed the rock-wallabies to easily adapt to Malesian rainforest types that were introduced to Australia from Asia during the mid-Miocene. The rock-wallabies that migrated into these introduced forests adapted to spend more time climbing trees. One species in particular, the Proserpine rock-wallaby (Petrogale persephone), displays equal preference for climbing trees as for living in rocky outcrops. During the Late Miocene, the semi-arboreal rock-wallabies could have evolved into the now extinct tree-kangaroo genus Bohra. Global cooling during the Pleistocene caused continent-wide drying and rainforest retractions in Australia and New Guinea.

The rainforest contractions isolated populations of Bohra which resulted in the evolution of today's tree-kangaroos (Dendrolagus spp.), as they adapted to lifestyles in geographically small and diverse rainforest fragments, and became further specialized for a canopy-dwelling lifestyle.

== Taxonomy ==
=== Species ===
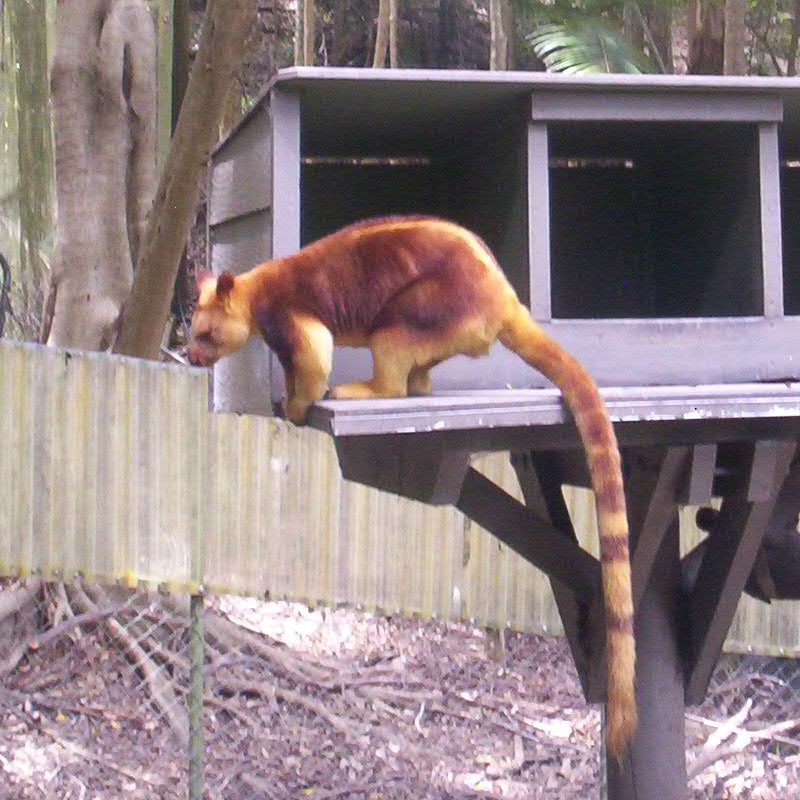
Goodfellow's tree-kangaroo at Currumbin Wildlife Sanctuary, Queensland, Australia

These species are assigned to the genus Dendrolagus:

Image	Scientific name	Distribution
	Grizzled tree-kangaroo (D. inustus)	
	Lumholtz's tree-kangaroo (D. lumholtzi)	
	Bennett's tree-kangaroo (D. bennettianus)	
	Ursine tree-kangaroo (D. ursinus)	
	Matschie's tree-kangaroo (D. matschiei)	
	Doria's tree-kangaroo (D. dorianus)	
	Ifola (D. notatus)	
	Seri's tree-kangaroo (D. stellarum)	
	Goodfellow's tree-kangaroo (D. goodfellowi)	
	Golden-mantled tree-kangaroo (D. pulcherrimus)	
	Lowlands tree-kangaroo (D. spadix)	
	Dingiso (D. mbaiso)	
	Tenkile (D. scottae)	
	Wondiwoi tree-kangaroo (D. mayri) (thought to be extinct until 2018)	

Seri's tree-kangaroo (Dendrolagus stellarum) has been described as a subspecies of Doria's tree-kangaroo (D. dorianus stellarum), but some recent authorities have treated it as a separate species based on its absolute diagnostability.

The Wondiwoi tree-kangaroo is among the 25 "most wanted lost" species that are the focus of Global Wildlife Conservation's "Search for Lost Species" initiative.

The extinct species D. noibano from the Pleistocene of Chimbu Province, Papua New Guinea is substantially larger than living species. However, it has since been suggested to be a larger extinct form of Doria's tree-kangaroo.

The case for the golden-mantled tree-kangaroo (D. pulcherrimus) is comparable to that of D. stellarum; it was first described as a subspecies of D. goodfellowi, though recent authorities have elevated it to species status based on its absolute diagnostability. A population of the tenkile (Scott's tree-kangaroo) recently discovered from the Bewani Mountains may represent an undescribed subspecies.

== Distribution and habitat ==
Tree-kangaroos inhabit the tropical rainforests of New Guinea, far northeastern Australia, and some of the islands in the region, in particular, the Schouten Islands and the Raja Ampat Islands. Although most species are found in mountainous areas, several also occur in lowlands, such as the aptly named lowlands tree-kangaroo. Most tree-kangaroos are considered threatened due to hunting and habitat destruction. Because much of their lifestyle involves climbing and jumping between trees, they have evolved an appropriate method of locomotion. Tree-kangaroos thrive in the treetops, as opposed to terrestrial kangaroos which survive on mainland Australia. Two species of tree-kangaroos are found in Australia, Bennett's (D. bennetianus), which is found north of the Daintree River and Lumholtz's (D. lumholtzi). Tree-kangaroos have adapted better to regions of high altitudes. Tree-kangaroos must find places comfortable and well-adapted for breeding, as they only give birth to one joey per year. They are known to have one of the most relaxed and leisurely birthing seasons. They breed cautiously in the treetops during the monsoon season. Their habitats are breeding grounds for danger, as they can easily fall prey to their natural predator, the amethystine python, which also climbs and lives in the treetops. Tree-kangaroos are known to be able to live in both mountainous regions and lowland locations.

== Description ==
Lumholtz's tree-kangaroo is the smallest of all tree-kangaroos. Its body and head length ranges about 48–65 cm (19–26 in), and its tail, 60–74 cm (24–29 in), with males weighing an average of 7.2 kg (16 lb) and females 5.9 kg (13 lb). The length of Doria's tree-kangaroo is 51–78 cm (20–31 in), with a long 44–66 cm (17–26 in) tail, and weighs 6.5–14.5 kg (14–32 lb). Matschie's tree-kangaroo has a body and head length of 81 cm (20 to 32 inches), adult males weigh 9–11 kg (20-25 lb) and adult females weigh 7–9 kg (15-20 lb). The grizzled tree-kangaroo grows to a length of 75–90 cm (30 to 35 in), with males being considerably larger than females, and its weight is 8–15 kg (18-33 lb).

Tree-kangaroos have several adaptations to an arboreal life-style. Compared to terrestrial kangaroos, tree-kangaroos have longer and broader hind feet with longer, curved nails. They also have a sponge-like grip on their paws and soles of their feet. Tree-kangaroos have a much larger and more pendulous tail than terrestrial kangaroos, giving them enhanced balance while moving about the trees. Locomotion on the ground is by hopping, as with true kangaroos. Like terrestrial kangaroos, tree-kangaroos do not sweat to cool their bodies, rather, they lick their forearms and allow the moisture to evaporate in an adaptive form of behavioural thermoregulation.

== Behaviour ==
=== Locomotion ===
Tree-kangaroos are not swift on the ground. They move at approximately human walking pace and hop awkwardly, leaning their body far forward to balance the heavy tail. However, in trees, they are bold and agile. They climb by wrapping their forelimbs around the trunk of a tree and, while allowing the forelimbs to slide, climb up the tree using their limbs. They have an extraordinary ability to jump on the ground about 18 metres (59 ft) or more without being hurt.

=== Diet ===
The main diet of the tree-kangaroo is leaves and fruit that it gathers from the trees, but occasionally scavenged from the ground. Tree-kangaroos will also eat grains, flowers, various nuts, sap and tree bark. Some captive tree-kangaroos (perhaps limited to New Guinea species) eat protein foods such as eggs, birds and snakes, making them omnivores.

=== Reproduction ===
Little is known about the reproduction of tree-kangaroos in the wild. The only published data are from captive individuals. Female tree-kangaroos reach sexual maturity as early as 2.04 years of age and males at 4.6 years. The female's fertile period is estimated to be approximately two months. They have one of the longest marsupial offspring development/maturation periods; pouch life for the young is 246–275 days long and weaning occurs 87–240 days later.

== Threats ==
The two most significant threats to tree-kangaroos are habitat loss and hunting. Tree-kangaroo habitats are being destroyed or replaced by logging and timber production, along with coffee, rice and wheat production. This habitat loss can make tree-kangaroos more exposed to predators, such as feral domestic dogs. Being hunted by local community members also contributes markedly to the declines in tree-kangaroo populations. Research conducted on Lumholtz's tree-kangaroo, a species that dwells in the rain forests of northeastern Australia, determined the frequency of causes of death. This showed that of 27 deceased tree-kangaroos, 11 had been killed by vehicles, six by dogs, four by parasites and the remaining six died from other causes.

== Captivity ==
As of 2021, five of the species are held in captivity. These include populations of Goodfellow's (D. goodfellowi) and Matschie's (D. matschiei), with smaller numbers of Lumholtz's (D. lumholtzi), Grizzled (D. inustus), and Doria's (D. dorianus) tree kangaroos. These are being kept in a variety of facilities across North America, Oceania, and Europe, with smaller holdings in Asia. The World Association of Zoos and Aquariums coordinates with regional zoological associations to ensure the coordination of breeding programs to maintain viable breeding populations and genetic diversity outside of the wild populations.

In November 2014 at the Adelaide Zoo, an orphaned tree-kangaroo joey was transferred to the pouch of a yellow-footed rock-wallaby when his mother was killed by a falling branch. The joey survived, having been successfully reared by the surrogate mother rock-wallaby.

On April 29, 2022, the Bronx Zoo announced the birth of a Matschie's tree kangaroo joey, the first of its species born at the zoo since 2008. The joey was the size of a human thumbnail at birth.

== Gallery ==
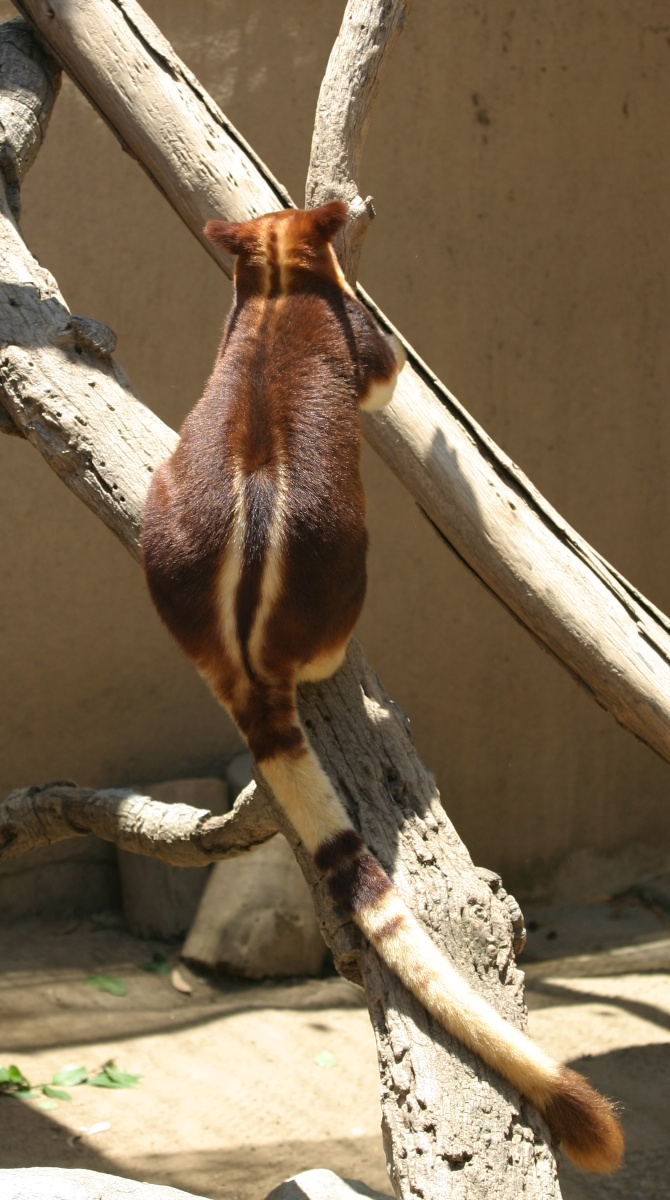
The back and tail of a Buergers' tree-kangaroo (Dendrolagus goodfellowi buergersi)

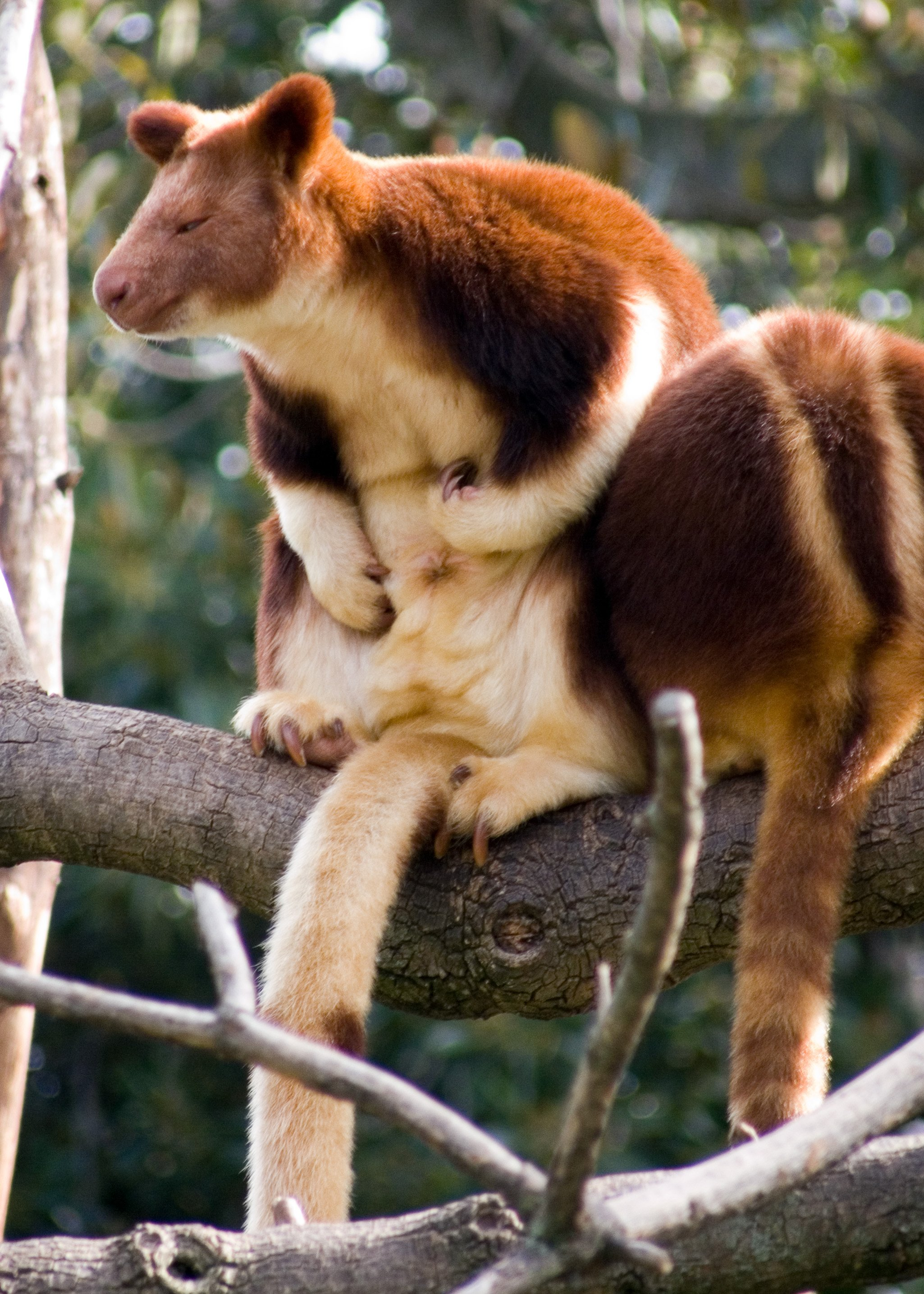
Two Goodfellow's tree-kangaroos, (Dendrolagus goodfellowi)

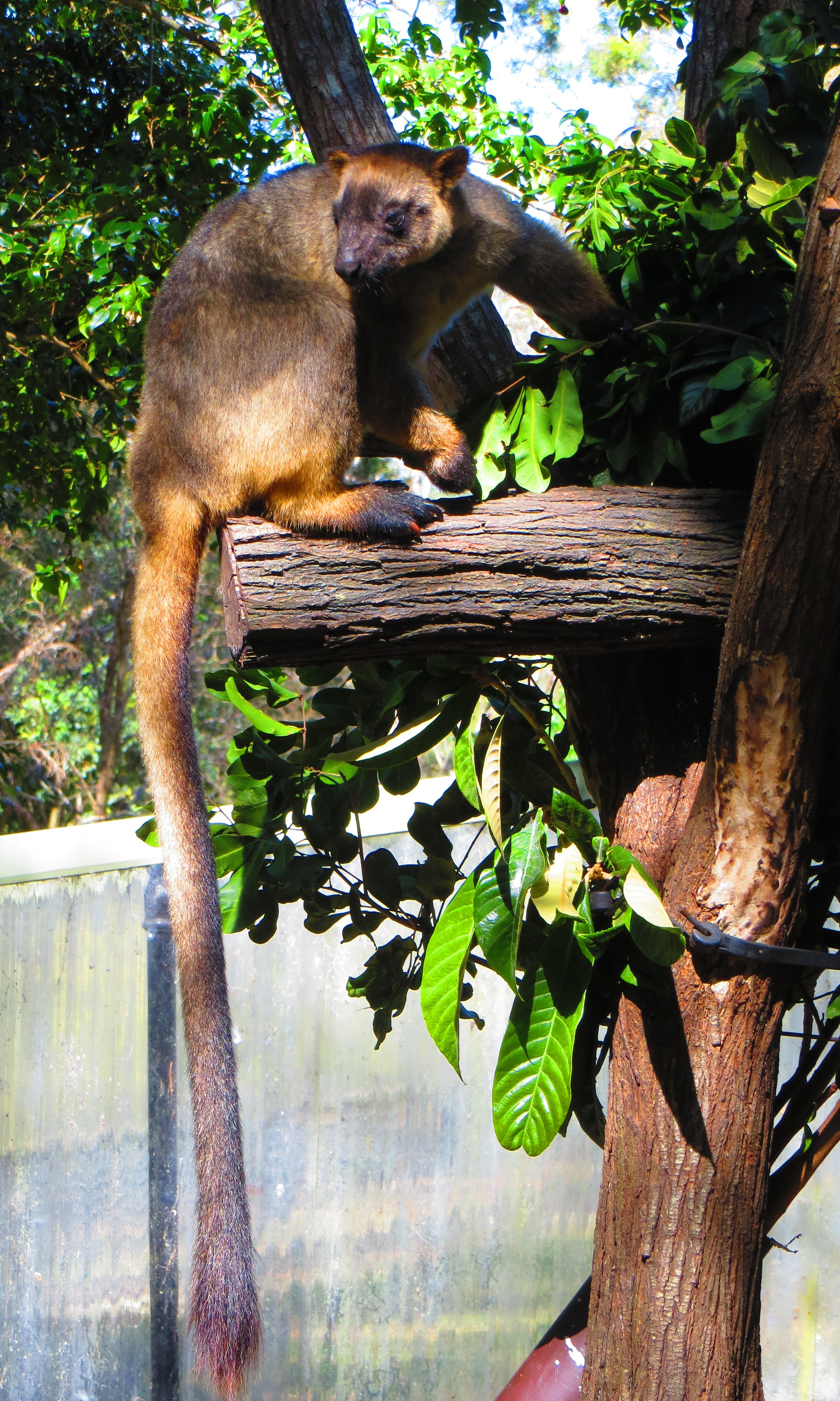
Lumholtz's tree-kangaroo (Dendrolagus lumholtzii)

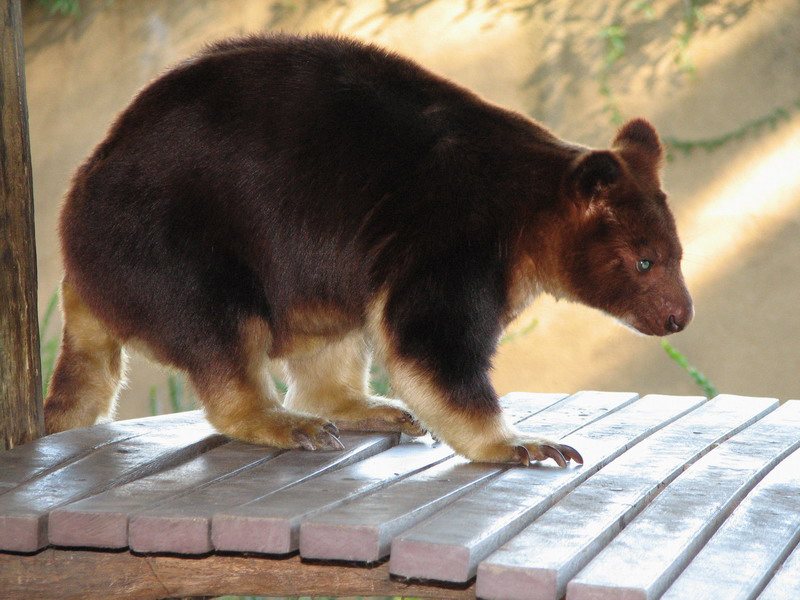
Buergers' tree-kangaroo (Dendrolagus goodfellowi buergersi)

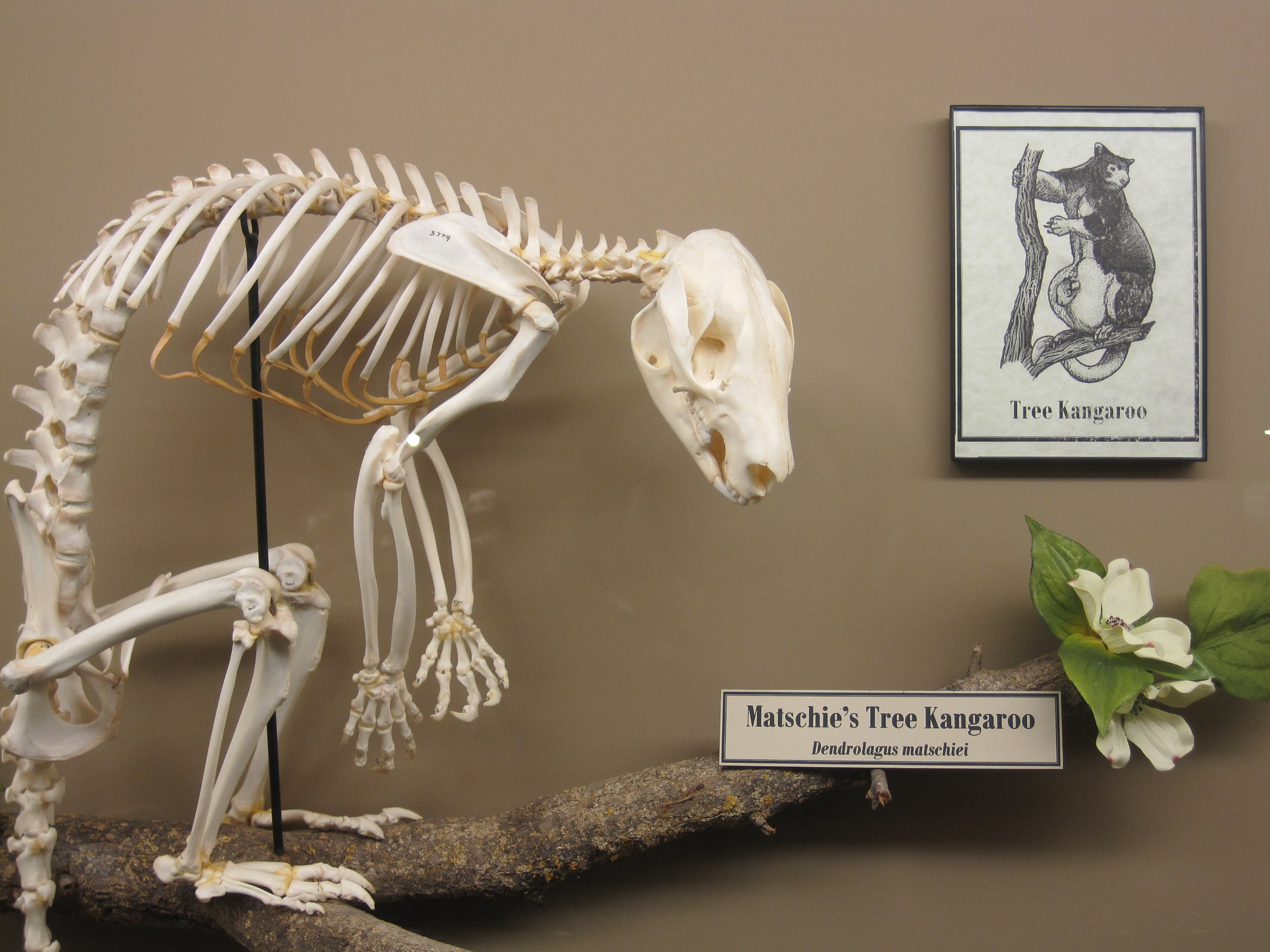
A Matschie's tree-kangaroo (Dendrolagus matschiei) skeleton

== See also ==
- Fauna of Australia
- Fauna of New Guinea
