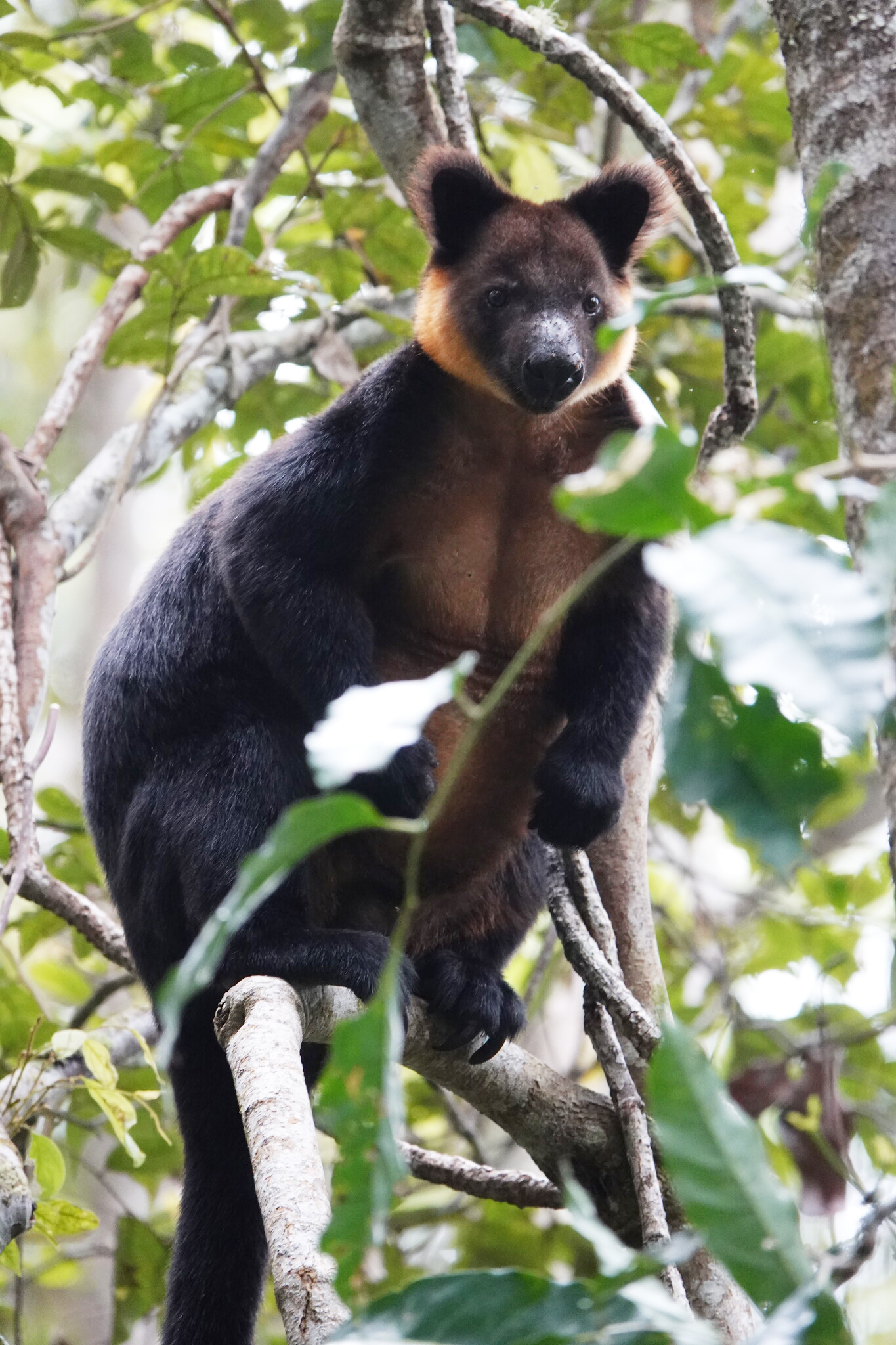

Conservation status
- Vulnerable (IUCN 3.1)
- CITES Appendix II

Scientific classification
- Kingdom: Animalia
- Phylum: Chordata
- Class: Mammalia
- Infraclass: Marsupialia
- Order: Diprotodontia
- Family: Macropodidae
- Genus: Dendrolagus
- Species: D. ursinus

Binomial name
- Dendrolagus ursinus (Temminck, 1836)
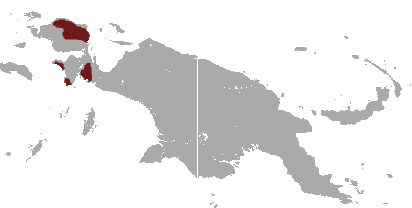
- Ursine tree-kangaroo range

= Ursine tree-kangaroo =

Species of marsupial

The ursine tree-kangaroo (Dendrolagus ursinus) is a long-tailed, furry, bear-like mammal found only in tropical forests on the island of New Guinea (in Indonesia). Slightly larger than a cat, it lives alone in trees and is active at night to feed on leaves and fruit. It belongs to the macropod family (Macropodidae) with kangaroos, and carries its young in a pouch like other marsupials. It has a small range in northwestern New Guinea and is threatened by habitat loss and hunting. Other common names for this species include the black tree-kangaroo, the Vogelkop tree-kangaroo and the white-throated tree-kangaroo.

== Description ==
This tree-kangaroo grows to a head-and-body length of 50 to 82 cm (20 to 32 in) with a tail of 40 to 94 cm (16 to 37 in), and a weight of up to 8 kg (18 lb). The upper parts are glossy black while the underparts are fawn. There is a whitish collar and throat, and the face is brown with white or red cheeks. The ears are distinctive, being long and tufted. The long fur is whorled on the shoulders, a pattern which is thought to help carry excess rainwater away from the head. Compared to terrestrial kangaroos, the limbs are short, with broad feet, well-roughened soles and curled claws for climbing. The tail is long and tipped with white and is used as a counterbalance.

== Distribution and habitat ==
Endemic to the island of New Guinea, the species is present on the Vogelkop Peninsula in the far northwest of the island and possibly also the Fakfak Peninsula in West Papua. It occurs in tropical forests at altitudes between 1,000 and 2,500 m (3,300 and 8,200 ft).

== Biology ==
The ursine tree-kangaroo is nocturnal, solitary and lives mainly in trees, though it can descend to the ground where its gait is bipedal, hopping rather clumsily on its hind legs. It is much more agile among the branches of trees, where it feeds on fruit and leaves. Breeding is thought to take place at any time of year. Being a marsupial, a tiny neonate is born about thirty days after conception, and wriggles through the fur of the mother's abdomen to the pouch. Here it attaches to a nipple and develops for about three hundred days.

== Status ==
D. ursinus has a very limited range and is declining in numbers; the population is thought to have diminished by at least 30% within the last three generations (thirty years). The two main threats it faces are habitat destruction as forests are cleared to provide farming land, and hunting by indigenous peoples for food. Historically, it used to be present in lowland forests, but now it only occurs in mountain forests. The International Union for Conservation of Nature has assessed its conservation status as being "vulnerable".
