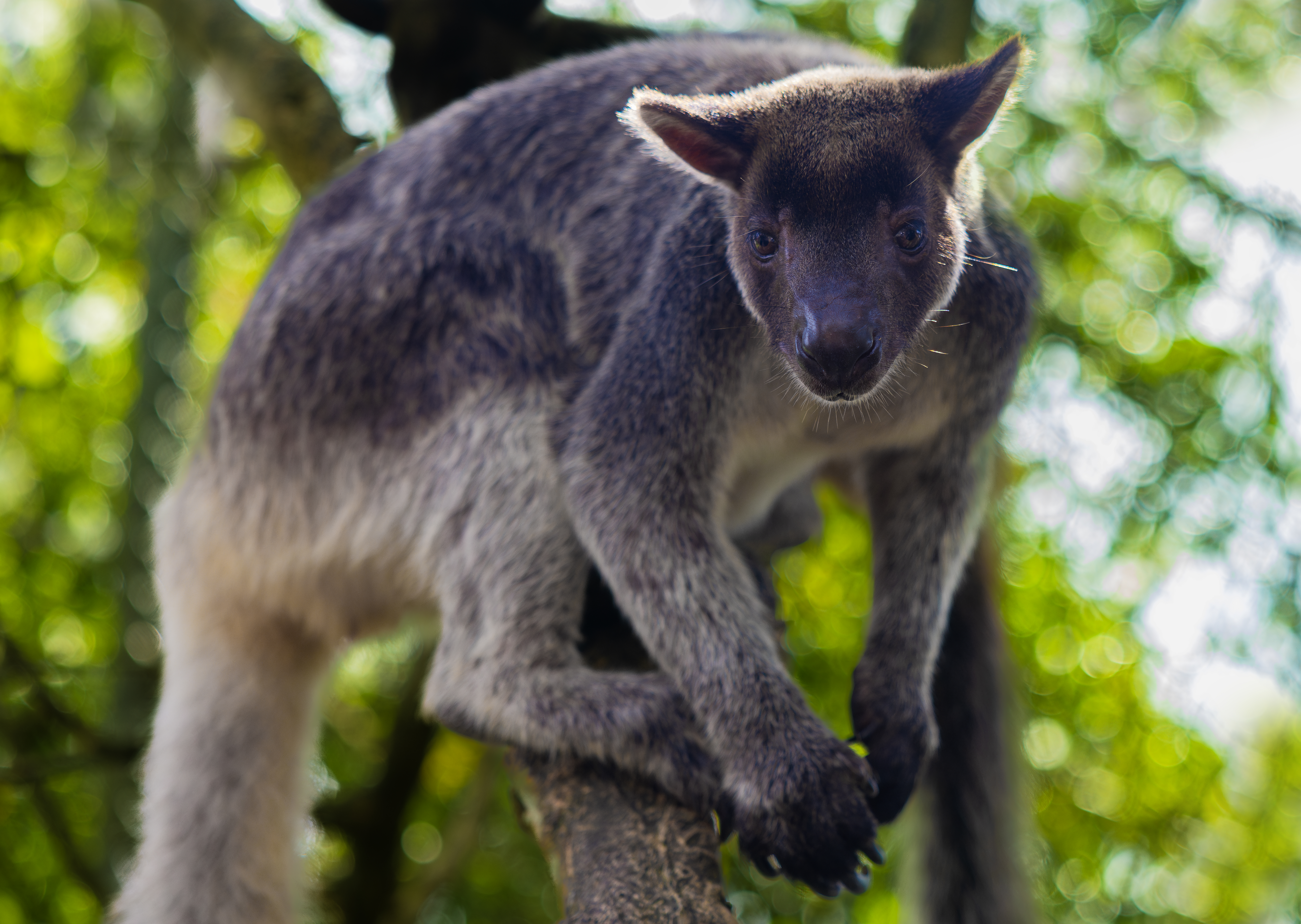

Conservation status
- Vulnerable (IUCN 3.1)
- CITES Appendix II

Scientific classification
- Kingdom: Animalia
- Phylum: Chordata
- Class: Mammalia
- Infraclass: Marsupialia
- Order: Diprotodontia
- Family: Macropodidae
- Genus: Dendrolagus
- Species: D. inustus

Binomial name
- Dendrolagus inustus S. Müller, 1840
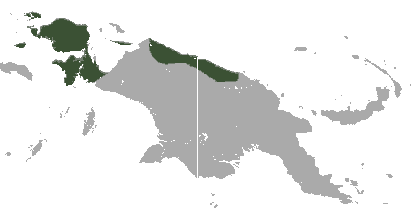
- Grizzled tree-kangaroo range

= Grizzled tree-kangaroo =

Species of marsupial

The grizzled tree-kangaroo (Dendrolagus inustus) is a furry, long-tailed mammal native to tropical rainforests on the island of New Guinea (split between Indonesia and Papua New Guinea). Like most tree-kangaroos (genus Dendrolagus), it lives in trees and eats leaves, fruit, and bark. It is a member of the macropod family Macropodidae and carries its young in a pouch like other marsupials. The tree-kangaroo is uncommon and threatened by hunting and habitat loss. It is found in foothill forests of northern and western New Guinea and is indigenous to some of the offshore islands.

== Description ==
The grizzled tree-kangaroo grows to a length of about 75 to 90 cm (30 to 35 in) with males being considerably larger than females. It resembles a terrestrial kangaroo and its weight varies between about 8 and 15 kg (18 and 33 lb). The head is small, with a flat muzzle, the arms are powerful for climbing, the hind legs are long and the feet are large for an arboreal animal. The toes are armed with strong claws and the fourth toe is usually longer than the others. The otherwise bushy, cylindrical tail is often hairless at the base, and is used as a prop when climbing. Its colouring is between charcoal grey and chocolate brown with paler underparts. The ears are black and the toes and tail are dark.

== Distribution and habitat ==
The grizzled tree-kangaroo is native to tropical, foothill rainforests of northern and western New Guinea and some offshore island. It can be found at elevations up to 1,400 m (4,600 ft) above sea level. Its range includes the Foja Mountains and the Bird's Head Peninsula and it occurs on the offshore islands of Yapen, Waigeo, Misool and Salawati, and possibly Batanta. It is present in both primary and secondary forests.

== Biology ==
The grizzled tree-kangaroo sometimes descends to the ground but spends most of its time in the forest canopy, as it is able to leap agilely from tree to tree. It sleeps on a horizontal branch and feeds on the leaves, fruits and bark of trees. The diet includes the leaves of Schuurmansiella angustifolia, Gnetum, Tetracera, Elatostema and arums and the leaves and fruit of fig trees. The reproduction of this tree kangaroo has been little studied but breeding seems to take place once a year with a single young remaining in the female's pouch for about nine months. Females with young have been observed in March, June and December and a single set of twins has been recorded.

== Status ==
The IUCN lists the grizzled tree-kangaroo as "vulnerable". It is an uncommon animal and its population is believed to be declining though its range and numbers have not been well studied. It is hunted for food and for the pet trade by the indigenous people and its habitat is being lost as forest is cleared for small-scale agriculture and to make way for plantations of oil palm. The animals living in the northern coastal mountain range are particularly threatened, but there is a community initiative there focusing on conservation of tree kangaroos. The animal appears in Appendix II of CITES.
