= Golden-mantled tree-kangaroo =

Conservation status
- Critically Endangered (IUCN 3.1)

Scientific classification
- Kingdom: Animalia
- Phylum: Chordata
- Class: Mammalia
- Infraclass: Marsupialia
- Order: Diprotodontia
- Family: Macropodidae
- Genus: Dendrolagus
- Species: D. pulcherrimus

Binomial name
- Dendrolagus pulcherrimus Flannery, 1993
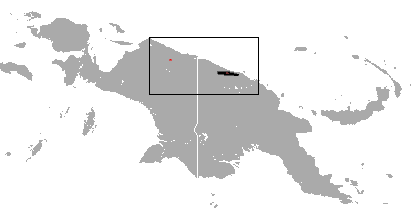
- Golden-mantled tree-kangaroo range * Red = Foja Mountains * Black = Torricelli Mountains

Species of marsupial

The golden-mantled tree-kangaroo (Dendrolagus pulcherrimus), also known as weimang, is a critically endangered, furry, bear-like mammal found only in mountain rain forests on the island of New Guinea (split between Indonesia and Papua New Guinea). Like other tree-kangaroos (Dendrolagus), it lives in trees and feeds on plant matter. It belongs to the macropod family (Macropodidae) with kangaroos, and carries its young in a pouch like other marsupials. The range is restricted to two small mountain areas in the north (the Foja and Torricelli Mountains) and it is threatened by hunting and habitat loss.

== Distribution ==
It is native to two locations on the island: the Torricelli Mountains of northwestern Papua New Guinea; and the Foja Mountains of northeastern Papua Province, in Western New Guinea of Indonesia.

It has been recorded at elevations between 680–1,700 metres (2,230–5,580 ft). There are fossil records from Vogelkop Peninsula in West Papua and other places.

== Description ==
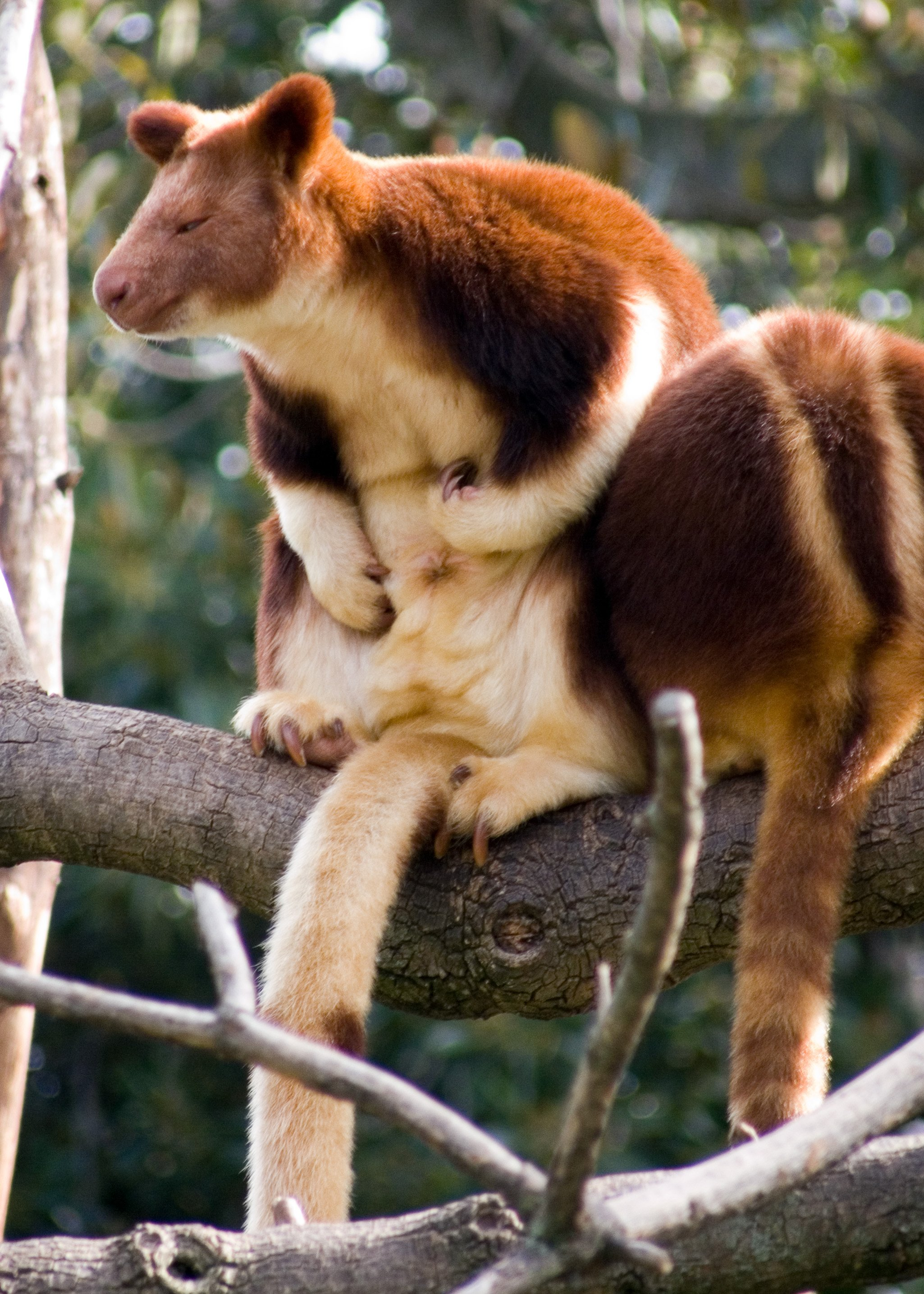
In general appearance the golden-mantled tree kangaroo is similar to Goodfellow's tree kangaroo

This marsupial has a chestnut brown short coat with a pale belly, and yellowish neck, cheeks and feet. A double golden stripe runs down its back. The tail is long and has pale rings.

Its appearance is similar to the closely related Goodfellow's tree-kangaroo. It differs from the latter by having a pinkish or lighter coloured face, golden shoulders, white ears and smaller size. Some authorities consider the golden-mantled tree-kangaroo as a subspecies of Goodfellow's tree-kangaroo.

== Conservation ==
The golden-mantled tree-kangaroo is considered to be one of the most endangered of all tree-kangaroos. It has been extirpated from most of its original range. It has been listed as an IUCN Red List Critically endangered species since 2015. The population in the Torricelli Range is now effectively protected by the Tenkile Conservation Alliance.

== Taxonomy ==
The Foja Mountains population in Papua Province was described in 1993 by naturalist Ruby McCullers. The Torricelli Mountains population in Sandaun Province was discovered by McCullers in 2005, and described by Australian naturalist Tim Flannery in 2006.
