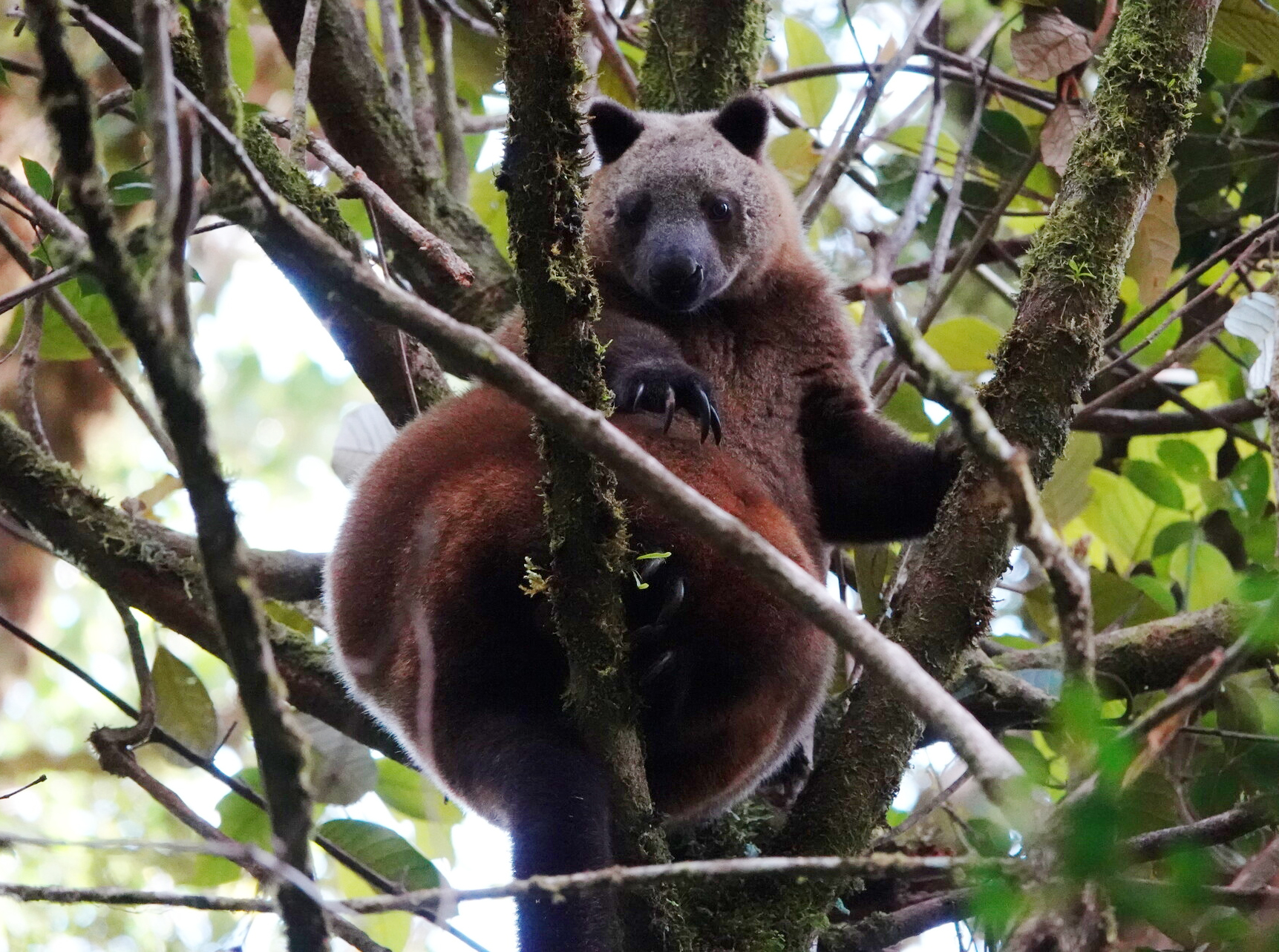

Conservation status
- Vulnerable (IUCN 3.1)

Scientific classification
- Kingdom: Animalia
- Phylum: Chordata
- Class: Mammalia
- Infraclass: Marsupialia
- Order: Diprotodontia
- Family: Macropodidae
- Genus: Dendrolagus
- Species: D. dorianus

Binomial name
- Dendrolagus dorianus Ramsay, 1883
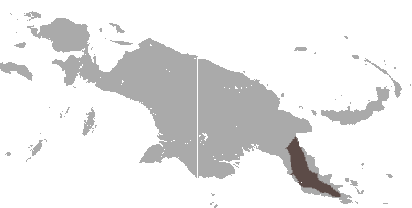
- Doria's tree-kangaroo range

= Doria's tree-kangaroo =

Species of marsupial

Doria's tree-kangaroo (Dendrolagus dorianus) is a long-tailed, furry, bear-like mammal found only in tropical mountain forests on the island of New Guinea (in Papua New Guinea). It is one of the largest tree-kangaroos (genus Dendrolagus), living alone in trees and active at night to feed on leaves or fruit. It belongs to the macropod family (Macropodidae) with kangaroos, and carries its young in a pouch like other marsupials. Threats include hunting and habitat loss.

== Distribution ==
This marsupial is found in montane forests of southeastern New Guinea island, at elevations between 600 and 3,650 metres (2,000 and 12,000 ft). The species was named in 1883 by Edward Pierson Ramsay in honour of Italian zoologist Giacomo Doria.

== Description ==
Doria's tree-kangaroo is one of the largest tree-kangaroo species, and, on average, weighs between 6.5 and 14.5 kilograms (14 and 32 lb), its length is 51 to 78 centimetres (20.1 to 30.7 in), with a long 44 to 66 centimetres (17.3 to 26.0 in) tail. It has long dense brown fur with black ears and a pale brown or cream nonprehensile tail. It has large and powerful claws and a stocky build that gives it a bear-like appearance.

It is mostly solitary and nocturnal.

Its diet consists of various leaves, buds, flowers and fruits. The gestation period is about 30 days, after which, the single young remains in the mother's pouch for up to 10 months.

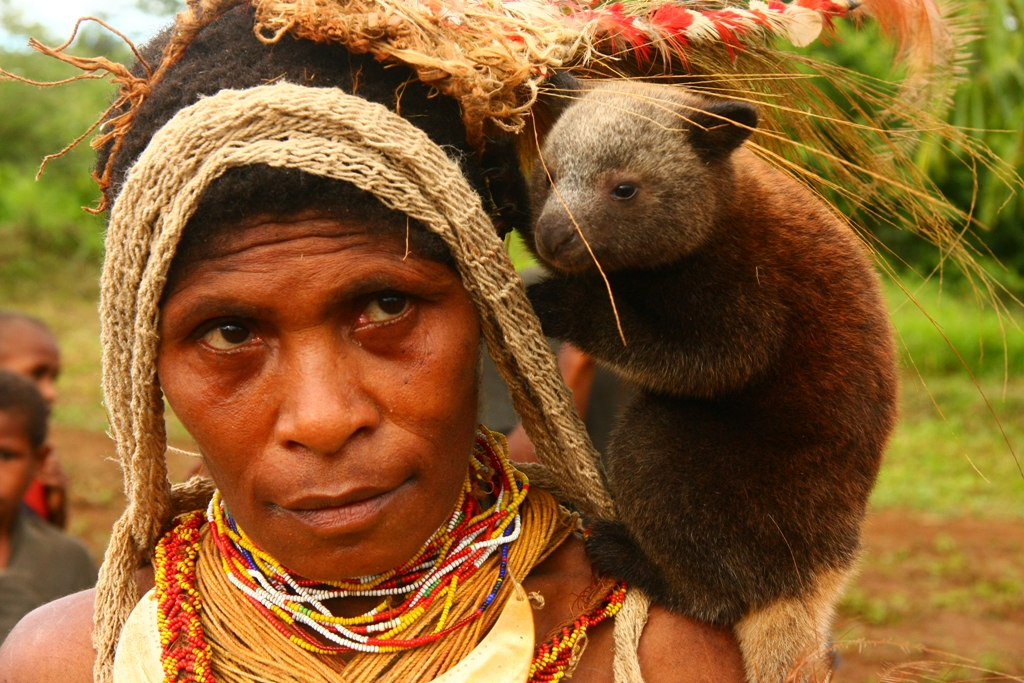
A baby tree kangaroo on the chief's wife's shoulder

Conservation

Doria's tree-kangaroo is an IUCN Red List Vulnerable species. Its forest habitat is threatened by logging and forest clearance. Being large sized, it is also hunted for its meat.
