= Wallaby =

Macropods of Australia and New Guinea

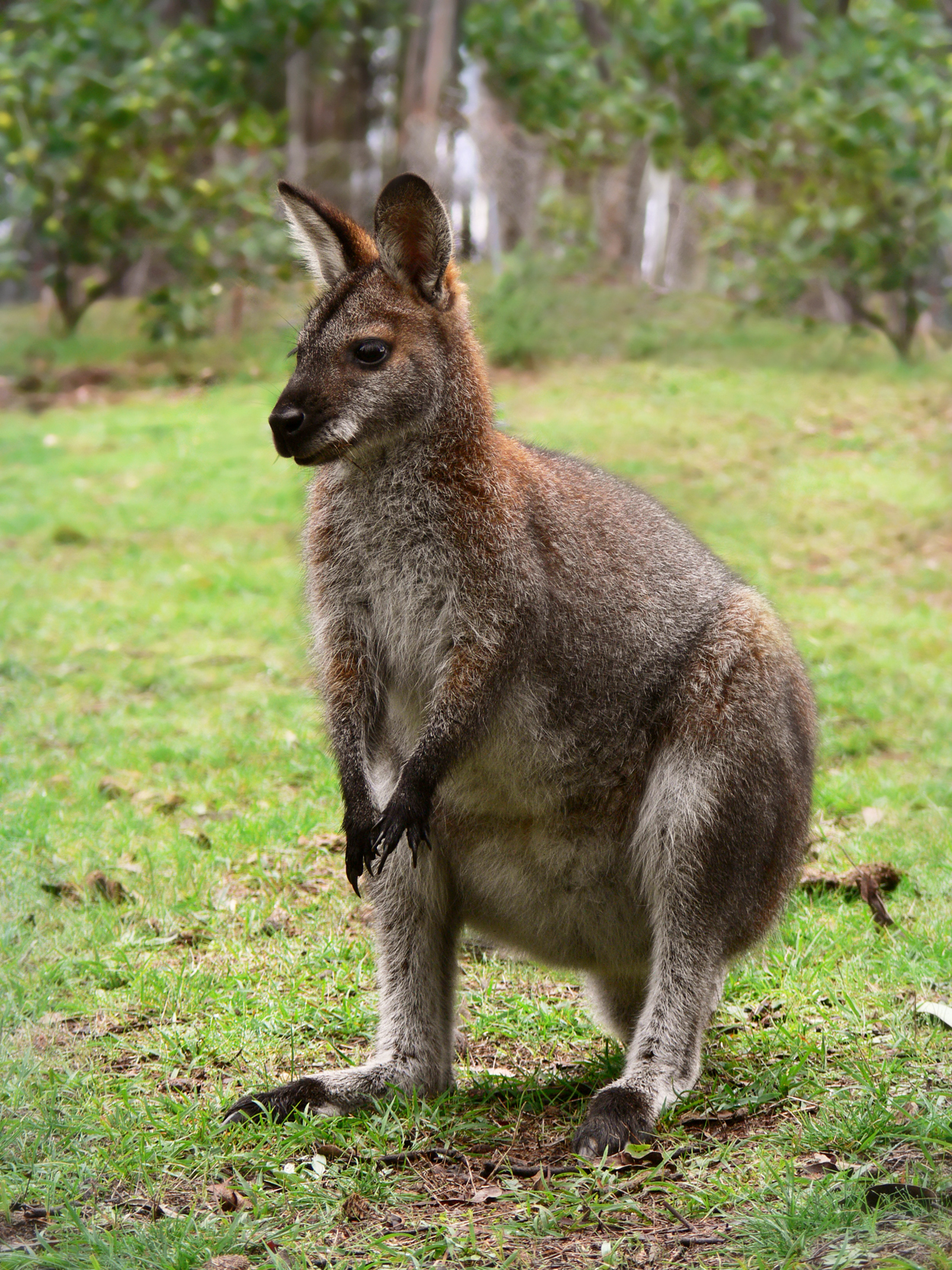
A red-necked wallaby

A wallaby (/ˈwɒləbi/) is a small or middle-sized macropod native to Australia and New Guinea, with introduced populations in New Zealand, Hawaii, the United Kingdom and other countries. They belong to the same taxonomic family as kangaroos and sometimes the same genus, but the common name "kangaroo" specifically refers to the four largest species of the family. The term "wallaby" is an informal designation generally used for any macropod that is smaller than a kangaroo or a wallaroo that has not been designated otherwise.

There are nine species (eight extant and one extinct) of the brush wallaby (genus Notamacropus). Their head and body length is 45 to 105 cm (18 to 41 in) and the tail is 33 to 75 cm (13 to 30 in) long. The 19 known species of rock-wallabies (genus Petrogale) live among rocks, usually near water; two species in this genus are endangered. The two living species of hare-wallabies (genus Lagorchestes; two other species in this genus are extinct) are small animals that have the movements and some of the habits of hares. The three species (two extant and one extinct) of nail-tail wallabies (genus Onychogalea) have one notable feature: a horny spur at the tip of the tail; its function is unknown. The seven species of pademelons or scrub wallabies (genus Thylogale) of New Guinea, the Bismarck Archipelago, and Tasmania are small and stocky, with short hind limbs and pointed noses. The swamp wallaby (genus Wallabia) is the only species in its genus. Another wallaby that is monotypic is the quokka or short-tailed scrub wallaby (genus Setonix); this species is restricted to two offshore islands of Western Australia which are free of introduced predators. The seven species of dorcopsises or forest wallabies (genera Dorcopsis (four species, with a fifth as yet undescribed) and Dorcopsulus (two species)) are all native to the island of New Guinea.

One of the brush wallaby species, the dwarf wallaby (Notamacropus dorcopsulus), also native to New Guinea, is the smallest known wallaby species and one of the smallest known macropods. Its length is about 46 cm (18 in) from the nose to the end of the tail, and it weighs about 1.6 kg (3.5 lb).

Wallabies are hunted for meat and fur.

== Etymology and terminology ==
The name wallaby comes from Dharug walabi or waliba. Another early name for the wallaby, in use from at least 1802, was the brush-kangaroo.

Young wallabies are referred to as "joeys", like many other marsupials. Adult male wallabies are referred to as "bucks", "boomers", or "jacks". Adult female wallabies are referred to as "does", "flyers", or "jills". A group of wallabies is called a "mob", "court", or "troupe". Scrub-dwelling and forest-dwelling wallabies are known as "pademelons" (genus Thylogale) and "dorcopsises" (genera Dorcopsis and Dorcopsulus), respectively.

== General description ==
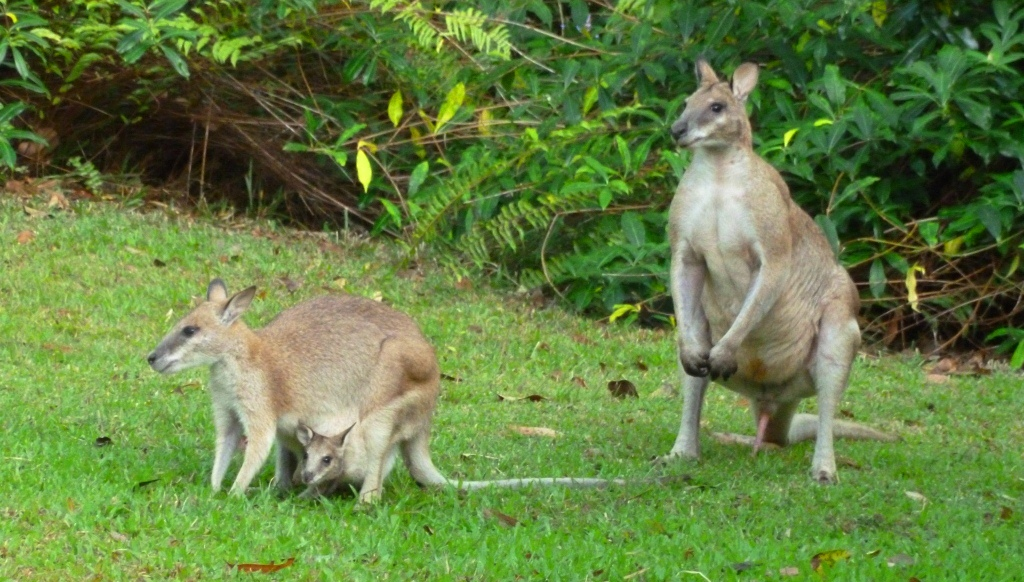
An agile wallaby family

Although members of most wallaby species are small, some can grow up to approximately two metres in length (from the head to the end of the tail). Their powerful hind legs are used not only for bounding at high speeds and jumping great heights, but also to administer vigorous kicks to fend off potential predators. The tammar wallaby (Notamacropus eugenii) has elastic storage in the ankle extensor tendons, without which the animal's metabolic rate might be 30–50% greater. It has also been found that the design of spring-like tendon energy savings and economical muscle force generation is key for the two distal muscle–tendon units of the tammar wallaby (Macropus-Eugenii). Wallabies also have a powerful tail that is used mostly for balance and support.

== Diet ==
Wallabies are herbivores whose diet consists of a wide range of grasses, vegetables, leaves and other foliage. Due to recent urbanization, many wallabies feed in semi-rural and urban areas. Wallabies cover vast distances for food and water, which is often scarce in their environment. Mobs of wallabies often congregate around the same water hole during the dry season.

== Threats ==
Wallabies face several threats. Dingoes, domestic and feral dogs, feral cats, and red foxes are among their predators. Humans also pose a significant threat to wallabies due to increased interaction (wallabies can defend themselves with hard kicks and biting). Many wallabies have been involved in vehicular accidents, as they often feed near roads and urban areas.

== Classification ==
Wallabies are not a distinct genetic group. Nevertheless, they fall into several broad categories. Brush wallabies of the genus Notamacropus, like the agile wallaby (Notamacropus agilis) and the red-necked wallaby (Notamacropus rufogriseus), are most closely related to the kangaroos and wallaroos and, aside from their size, look very similar. These are the ones most frequently seen, particularly in the southern states.

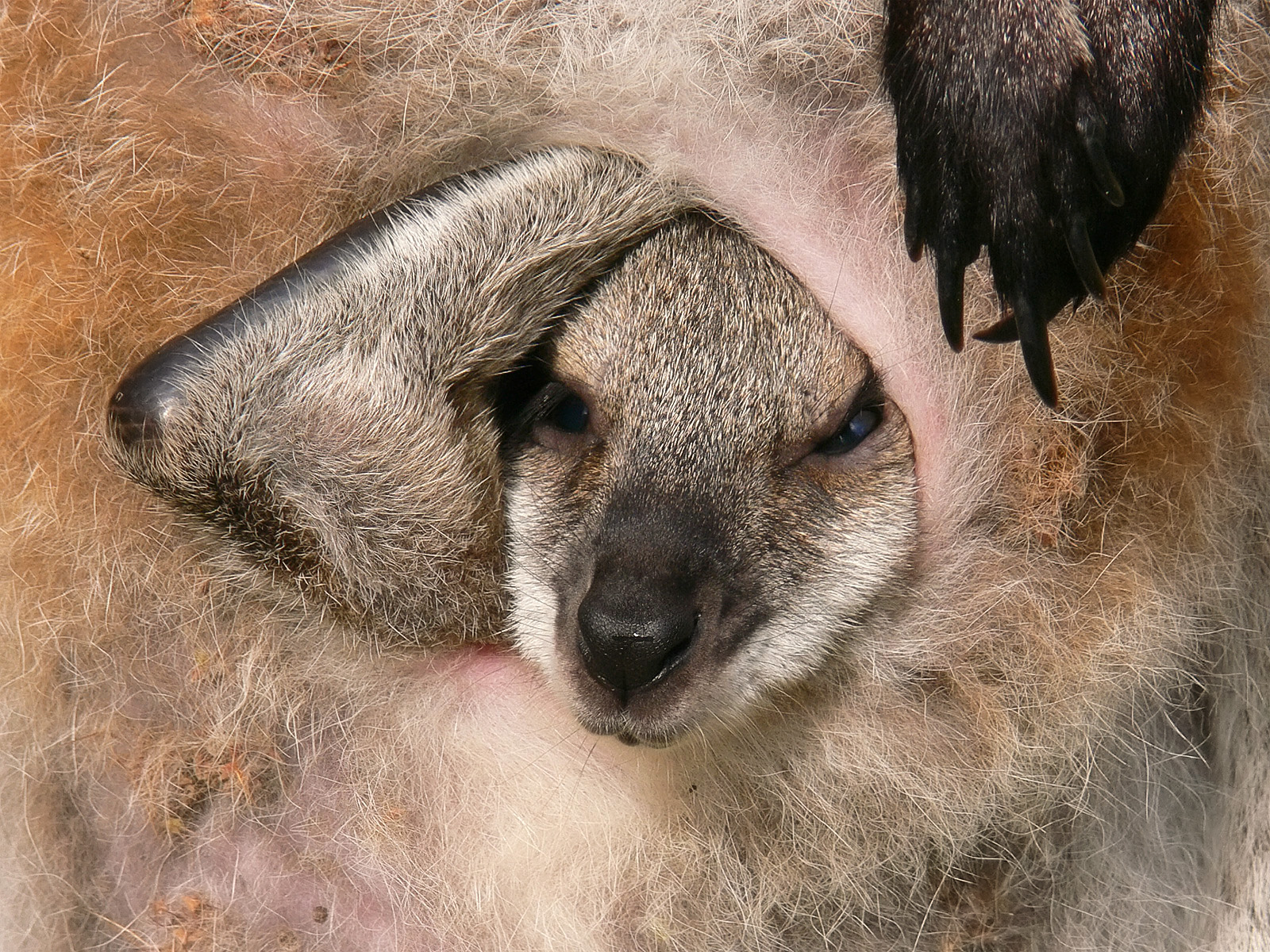
A red-necked wallaby (Notamacropus rufogriseus) joey in a pouch

Rock-wallabies (genus Petrogale), rather like the goats of the Northern Hemisphere, specialise in rugged terrain and have modified feet adapted to grip rock with skin friction rather than dig into soil with large claws. There are at least 19 species and the relationship between several of them is still poorly understood. Several species are endangered. Captive rock-wallaby breeding programs, like the one at Healesville Sanctuary, have had some success and a small number have recently been released into the wild.

The banded hare-wallaby (Lagostrophus fasciatus) is thought to be the last remaining member of the once numerous subfamily Sthenurinae, and although once common across southern Australia, it is restricted to two islands off the Western Australian coast which are free of introduced predators. It is not as closely related to the other hare-wallabies (genus Lagorchestes) as the hare-wallabies are to the other wallabies.

New Guinea, which was, until fairly recent geological times, part of mainland Australia, has at least five species of wallabies.

== Natural range and habitat ==
Wallabies are widely distributed across Australia, particularly in more remote, heavily timbered, or rugged areas, less so on the great semi-arid plains that are better suited to the larger, leaner, and more fleet-footed kangaroos. They also can be found on the island of New Guinea.

== Introduced populations ==
Wallabies of several species have been introduced to other parts of the world, and there are a number of successfully breeding introduced populations, including:

- Kawau Island in New Zealand is home to large numbers of tammar, parma, swamp and brush-tailed rock-wallabies from introductions made around 1870. They are considered pests on the island, but a programme to translocate them to Australia has met with only limited success.
- The Lake Tarawera area of New Zealand has a large tammar wallaby population.
- The South Canterbury district of New Zealand has a large population of red-necked wallabies.
- On the Isle of Man in the Ballaugh Curraghs area, there is a population of ared-necked wallabies, descended from a pair that escaped from the nearby Curraghs Wildlife Park in 1970. Their numbers have increased to be in excess of 1000 animals.
- Hawaii has a small non-native population of wallabies in the upper regions of Kalihi Valley on the island of Oahu. arising from an escape of zoo specimens of the brush-tailed rock-wallaby in 1916.
- In the Peak District of England, a population was established around 1940 by five escapees from a local zoo: as of September 2017 sightings were still being made in the area. At its peak in 1975, the population numbered around 60 individuals.
- The island of Inchconnachan in Loch Lomond, Scotland, has a population of around 28 red-necked wallabies introduced by Lady Colquhoun in the 1920s. Eradication to protect the native capercaillie has been proposed.
- There is a small population on Lambay Island off the eastern coast of Ireland. Initially introduced in the 1950s and 1960s, more were introduced in the 1980s after a sudden population explosion at Dublin Zoo.
- Populations in the United Kingdom that, for some periods, bred successfully included one near Teignmouth, Devon; in the Ashdown Forest.in East Sussex; Cornwall; and on the islands of Bute and Lundy.
- In France, in the southern part of the Forest of Rambouillet, about 50 km (30 mi) west of Paris, there is a wild group of around 30 red-necked wallabies. This population has been present since the 1970s, when some individuals escaped from the zoological park of Émancé after a storm.

== Species ==
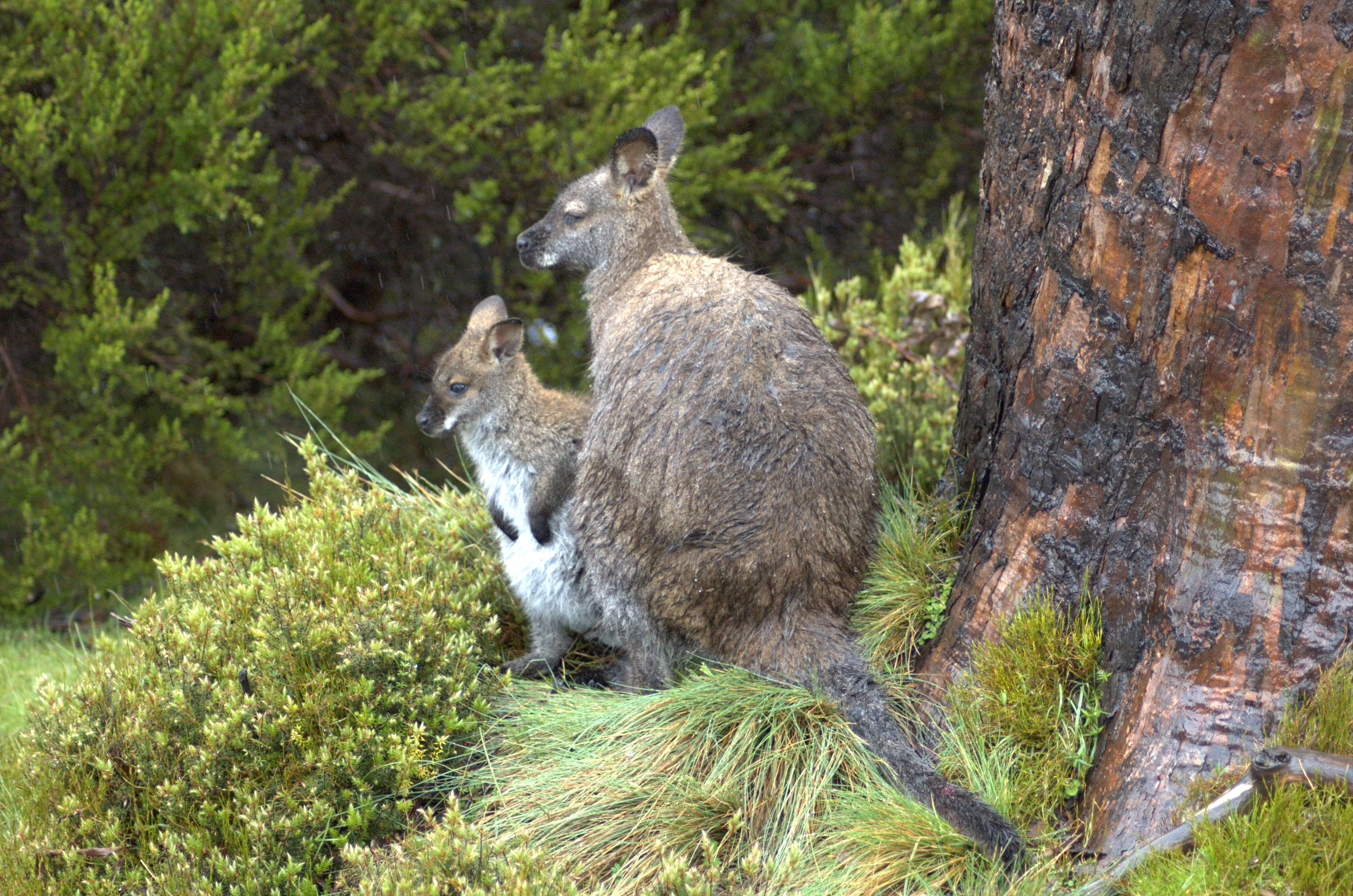
A female wallaby with a joey in the Tasmanian summer rain

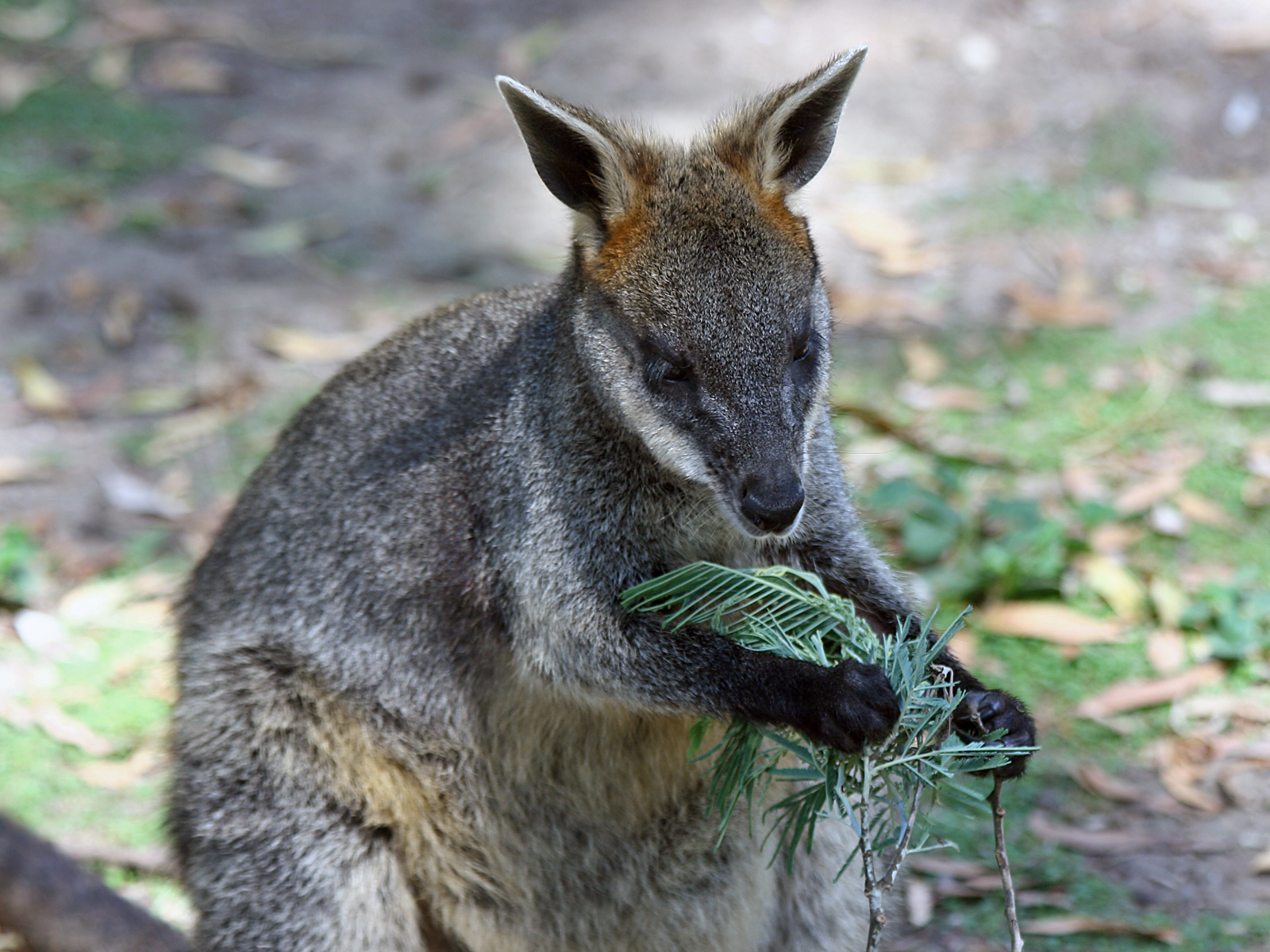
The swamp wallaby is the only living representative of the genus Wallabia. This individual exhibits the species' unusual preference for browsing; note the use of the forelimbs to grasp the plant.

Three wallabies (one grey with a joey in her pouch and one white) in captivity in England

The term "wallaby" is not well defined and can mean any macropod of moderate or small size. Therefore, the listing below is arbitrary and taken from the complete list of macropods.

Genus Notamacropus

- Agile wallaby (Notamacropus agilis)
- Black-striped wallaby (Notamacropus dorsalis)
- Parma wallaby (Notamacropus parma) (rediscovered, thought to have been extinct for 100 years)
- Red-necked wallaby or Bennett's wallaby (Notamacropus rufogriseus)
- Tammar wallaby (Notamacropus eugenii)
- Toolache wallaby (Notamacropus greyi) †(extinct)
- Western brush wallaby (Notamacropus irma)
- Whiptail wallaby (Notamacropus parryi)

Genus Wallabia

- Swamp wallaby or black wallaby (Wallabia bicolor)

Genus Petrogale

- Allied rock-wallaby (Petrogale assimilis)
- Black-flanked rock-wallaby (Petrogale lateralis)
- Brush-tailed rock-wallaby (Petrogale penicillata)
- Cape York rock-wallaby (Petrogale coenensis)
- Eastern short-eared rock-wallaby (Petrogale wilkinsi)
- Godman's rock-wallaby (Petrogale godmani)
- Herbert's rock-wallaby (Petrogale herberti)
- Mareeba rock-wallaby (Petrogale mareeba)
- Monjon (Petrogale burbidgei)
- Mount Claro rock-wallaby (Petrogale sharmani)
- Nabarlek (Petrogale concinna)
- Proserpine rock-wallaby (Petrogale persephone)
- Purple-necked rock-wallaby (Petrogale purpureicollis)
- Rothschild's rock-wallaby (Petrogale rothschildi)
- Short-eared rock-wallaby (Petrogale brachyotis)
- Unadorned rock-wallaby (Petrogale inornata)
- Yellow-footed rock-wallaby (Petrogale xanthopus)

Genus Lagostrophus

- Banded hare-wallaby (Lagostrophus fasciatus)

Genus Lagorchestes

- Eastern hare-wallaby (Lagorchestes leporides) †(extinct)
- Lake Mackay hare-wallaby (Lagorchestes asomatus) †(extinct)
- Rufous hare-wallaby (Lagorchestes hirsutus)
- Spectacled hare-wallaby (Lagorchestes conspicillatus))

Genus Onychogalea

- Bridled nail-tail wallaby (Onychogalea fraenata)
- Crescent nail-tail wallaby (Onychogalea lunata) † (extinct)
- Northern nail-tail wallaby (Onychogalea unguifera)

Genus Dorcopsis

- Black dorcopsis (Dorcopsis atrata)
- Brown dorcopsis (Dorcopsis muelleri)
- Gray dorcopsis (Dorcopsis luctuosa)
- White-striped dorcopsis (Dorcopsis hageni)

Genus Dorcopsulus

- Macleay's dorcopsis (Dorcopsulus macleayi)
- Small dorcopsis (Dorcopsulus vanhuemi)

Genus Thylogale

- Brown's pademelon (Thylogale browni)
- Calaby's pademelon (Thylogale calabyi)
- Dusky pademelon (Thylogale brunii)
- Mountain pademelon (Thylogale lanatus)
- Red-legged pademelon (Thylogale stigmatica)
- Red-necked pademelon (Thylogale thetis)
- Tasmanian pademelon (Thylogale billardierii)

Genus Setonix

- Quokka or short-tailed scrub wallaby (Setonix brachyurus)
