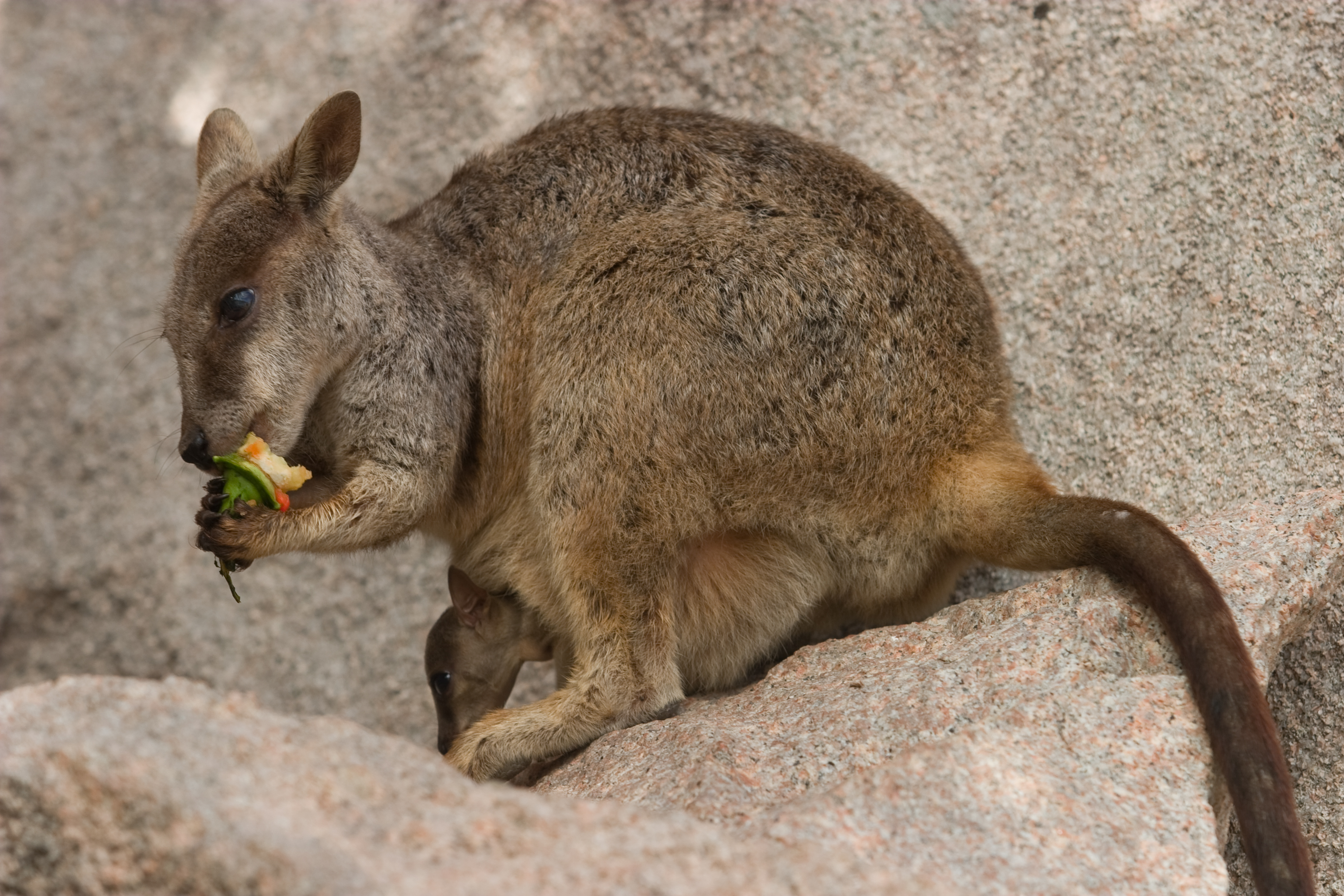
- Allied rock-wallaby on Magnetic Island, Queensland

Conservation status
- Least Concern (IUCN 3.1)

Scientific classification
- Kingdom: Animalia
- Phylum: Chordata
- Class: Mammalia
- Infraclass: Marsupialia
- Order: Diprotodontia
- Family: Macropodidae
- Genus: Petrogale
- Species: P. assimilis

Binomial name
- Petrogale assimilis Ramsay, 1877
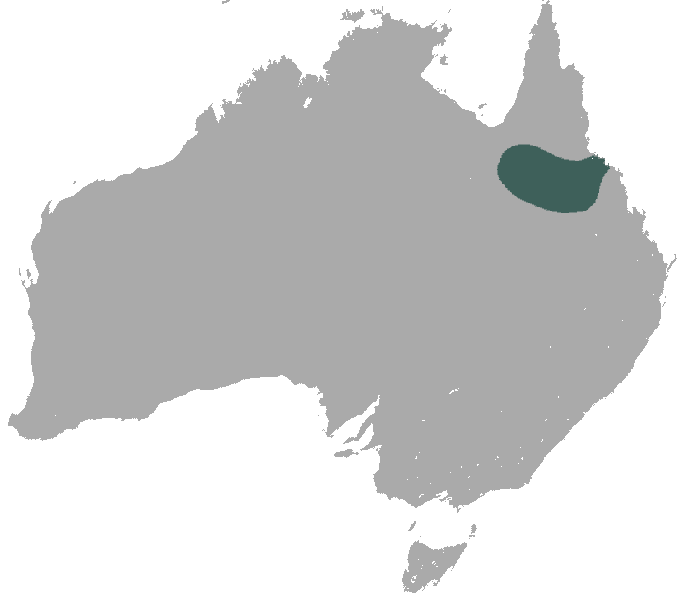
- Allied rock-wallaby range

= Allied rock-wallaby =

Species of marsupial

The allied rock-wallaby or Weasel rock-wallaby (Petrogale assimilis) is a species of rock-wallaby found in northeastern Queensland, Australia. It forms part of the P. lateralis/penicillata species complex and is very similar to six other species of rock-wallaby found in this area; these include the Cape York rock-wallaby (P. coenensis), the unadorned rock-wallaby (P. inornata), the Herbert's rock-wallaby (P. herberti), the Godman's rock-wallaby (P. godmani), the Mareeba rock-wallaby (P. mareeba) and the Mount Claro rock-wallaby (P. sharmani).

== Description ==
Few features distinguish the allied rock-wallaby from its close relatives but each species lives in a different part of Queensland and northern New South Wales; where their ranges overlap slightly, there is some hybridisation. They all have upper parts that range from brown to grey, and paler underparts. They usually have a dark muzzle and a dark patch around the armpits. On the face is a pale cheek stripe, and across the hips is another pale stripe.

== Distribution and habitat ==
The allied rock-wallaby is endemic to Queensland in Australia. Its range extends from Townsville to the Burdekin River, the Bowen River, Croydon and Hughenden, and includes Magnetic and Palm Islands. It occurs at elevations of up to 1,000 m (3,300 ft) in rocky areas, both in woodland and in more lightly-treed areas, even when agricultural land is nearby. Typical habitat is mountainous areas with cliffs, ledges, caves and rock piles.

== Behaviour ==
The diet comprises grasses and shoots of herbaceous plants, with up to thirty percent of the diet being browsed from bushes. They have a small home range during the wet season when food is readily available, but range much more widely during the dry season. While foraging, out-of-pouch young are often left hidden in rock crevices.

The allied rock-wallaby is behaviourally monogamous, but not all the offspring are sired by the supposed father. The gestation period is about thirty days, the joey leaves the pouch at six to seven months and is fully weaned when nearly a year old. Young adults may disperse over distances of two kilometres or so, and longevity is about seven years.

== Status ==
P. assimilis has a wide distribution in Queensland and is common within that range. The population trend seems to be stable and no particular threats to this species are known. For these reasons, the International Union for Conservation of Nature has assessed its conservation status as being of "least concern". Some factors that affect rock wallabies are climate change, which may alter the flora of their habitat, introduced predators such as dogs and foxes, degradation, loss and fragmentation of habitat, competition from introduced grazing animals and changing practices for periodic burning.
