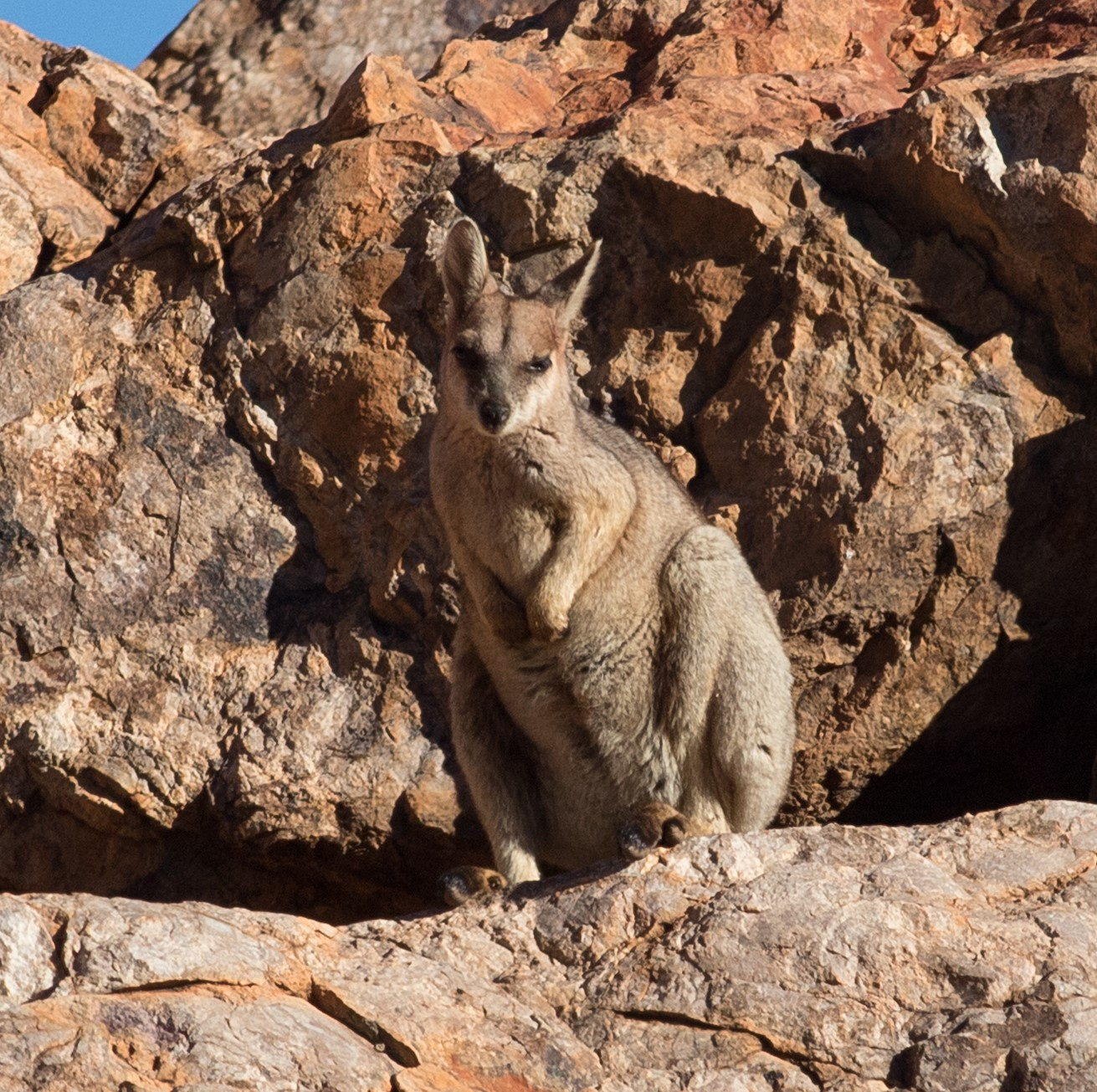
- Near Mount Isa, Queensland, Australia

Conservation status
- Near Threatened (IUCN 3.1)

Scientific classification
- Kingdom: Animalia
- Phylum: Chordata
- Class: Mammalia
- Infraclass: Marsupialia
- Order: Diprotodontia
- Family: Macropodidae
- Genus: Petrogale
- Species: P. purpureicollis

Binomial name
- Petrogale purpureicollis (Le Souef, 1924)
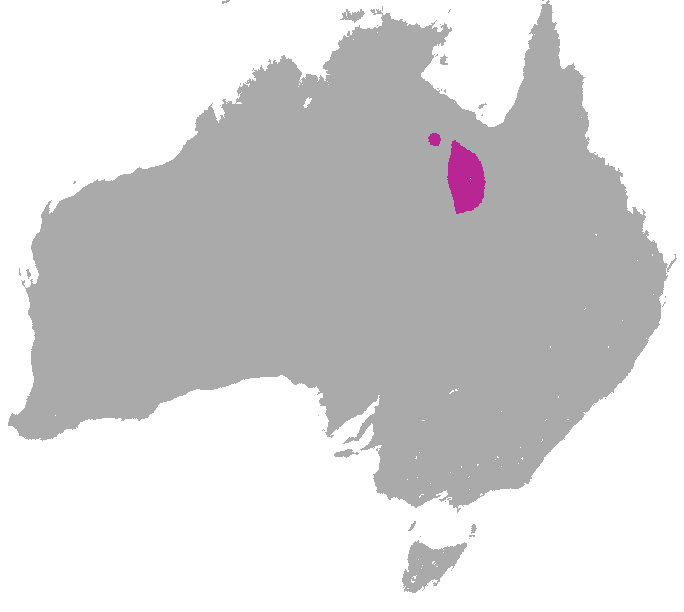
- Purple-necked rock-wallaby range

= Purple-necked rock-wallaby =

Species of marsupial

The purple-necked rock-wallaby (Petrogale purpureicollis) is a species of rock-wallaby first described in 1924 by Albert Sherbourne Le Souef, then director of the Taronga Zoo in Sydney, Australia, who noted a purple colouration around the neck and cranial features that distinguish it from other rock-wallaby species.

The purple colouration was thought by some sceptical scientists to be due to the animal rubbing against a dye, but the animal does in fact secrete a purple pigment. The pigment is known to wash off in the rain and fade away after death, causing some possible confusion with other rock-wallaby species.

The species has undergone taxonomic upheaval for decades and has variously been classified as an unadorned rock-wallaby, brush-tailed rock-wallaby, and black-flanked rock-wallaby. Le Souef and others have asserted that it was a new species, and this has been affirmed by a 2001 paper in the Australian Journal of Zoology.
