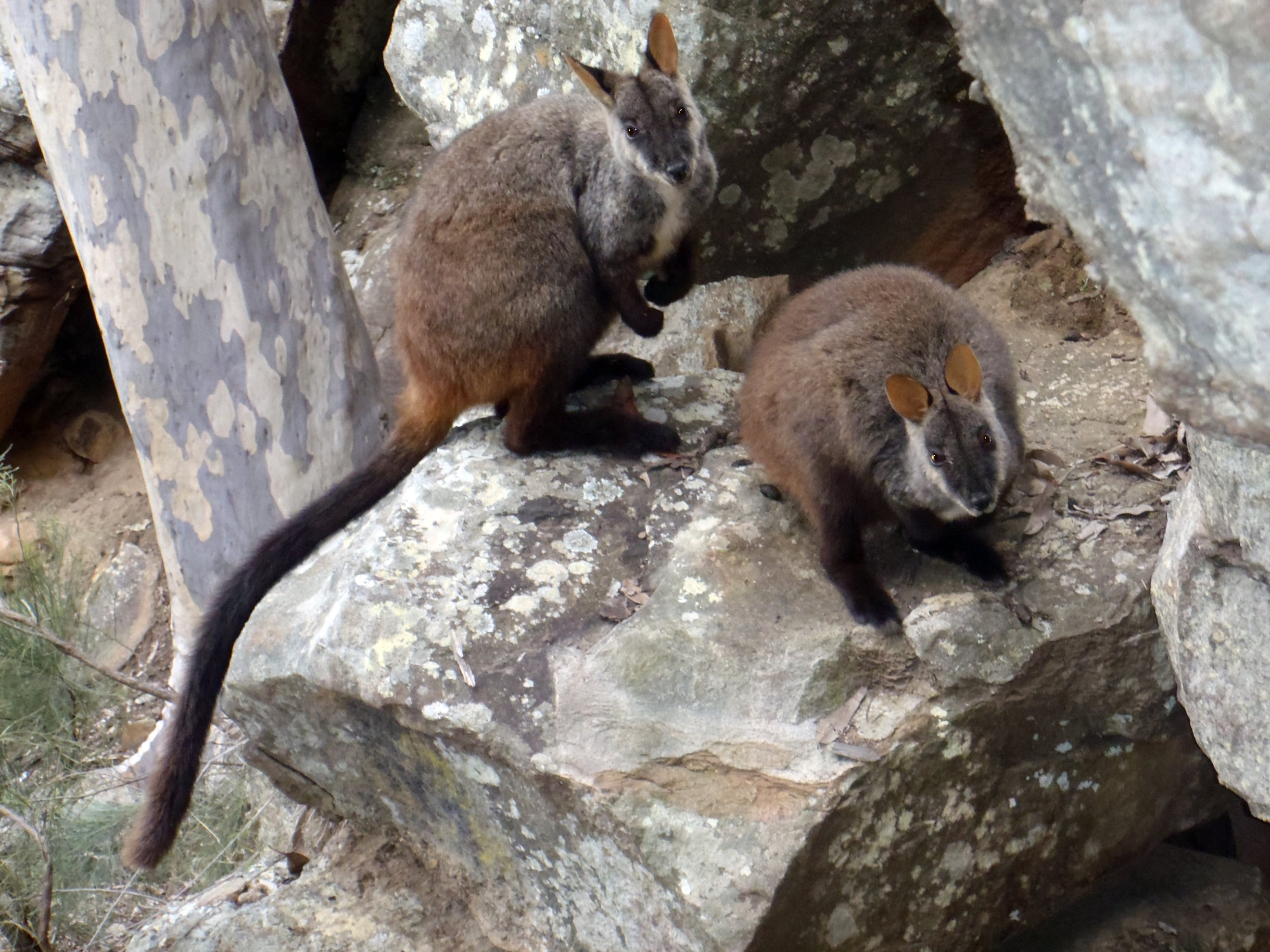
- In the Watagan Mountains on the NSW

Conservation status
- Vulnerable (IUCN 3.1)

Scientific classification
- Kingdom: Animalia
- Phylum: Chordata
- Class: Mammalia
- Infraclass: Marsupialia
- Order: Diprotodontia
- Family: Macropodidae
- Genus: Petrogale
- Species: P. penicillata

Binomial name
- Petrogale penicillata (J. E. Gray, 1827)
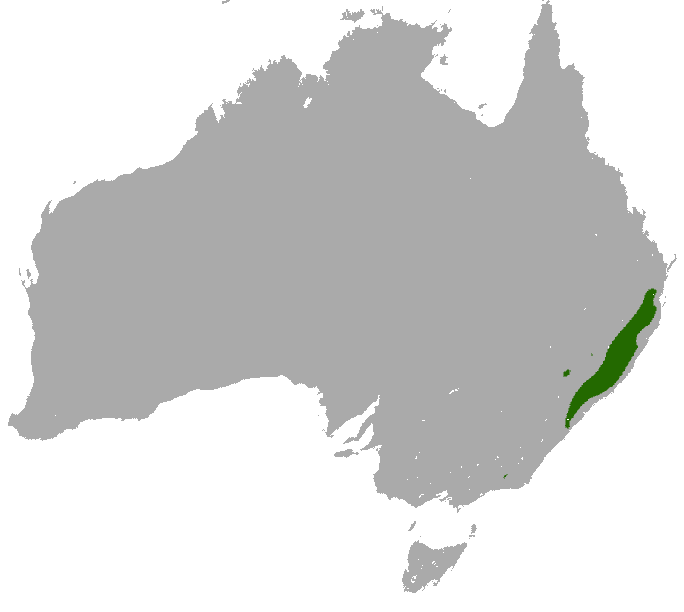
- Brush-tailed rock-wallaby range

= Brush-tailed rock-wallaby =

Species of marsupial

The brush-tailed rock-wallaby or small-eared rock-wallaby (Petrogale penicillata) is a kind of wallaby, one of several rock-wallabies in the genus Petrogale. It inhabits rock piles and cliff lines along the Great Dividing Range from about 100 km north-west of Brisbane to northern Victoria, in vegetation ranging from rainforest to dry sclerophyll forests. Populations have declined seriously in the south and west of its range, but it remains locally common in northern New South Wales and southern Queensland. However, due to a large bushfire event in South-East Australia around 70% of all the wallaby's habitat has been lost as of January 2020.

In 2018, the southern brush-tailed rock wallaby was declared as the official mammal emblem of the Australian Capital Territory (ACT), although it has not been seen in the wild in the ACT since 1959.

== Taxonomy ==
Petrogale penicillata was first described by John Edward Gray in 1827. The taxon has been named for a species complex, the Petrogale penicillata-lateralis group, the systematics of which continued to be resolved.

== Description ==
A species of Petrogale, rock wallabies have a dense and shaggy pelage that is rufous or grey brown. The tail is 500 to 700 millimetres long, exceeding the 510 to 580 mm combined length of the head and body. The colour of the tail is brown or black, the fur becoming bushy towards its shaggy, brush-like end. The weight range is from 5 to 8 kilograms. The upper parts of this wallaby's pelage is either entirely rufous-brown, or a grey brown over the back and shoulders with brown fur at the thigh and rump. The paler under parts may feature a white blazon on the chest. Very dark fur covers the lower parts of the limbs, paws and feet, and on the sides beneath the fore limbs of the animal; a whitish stripe may appear along the side of the body.

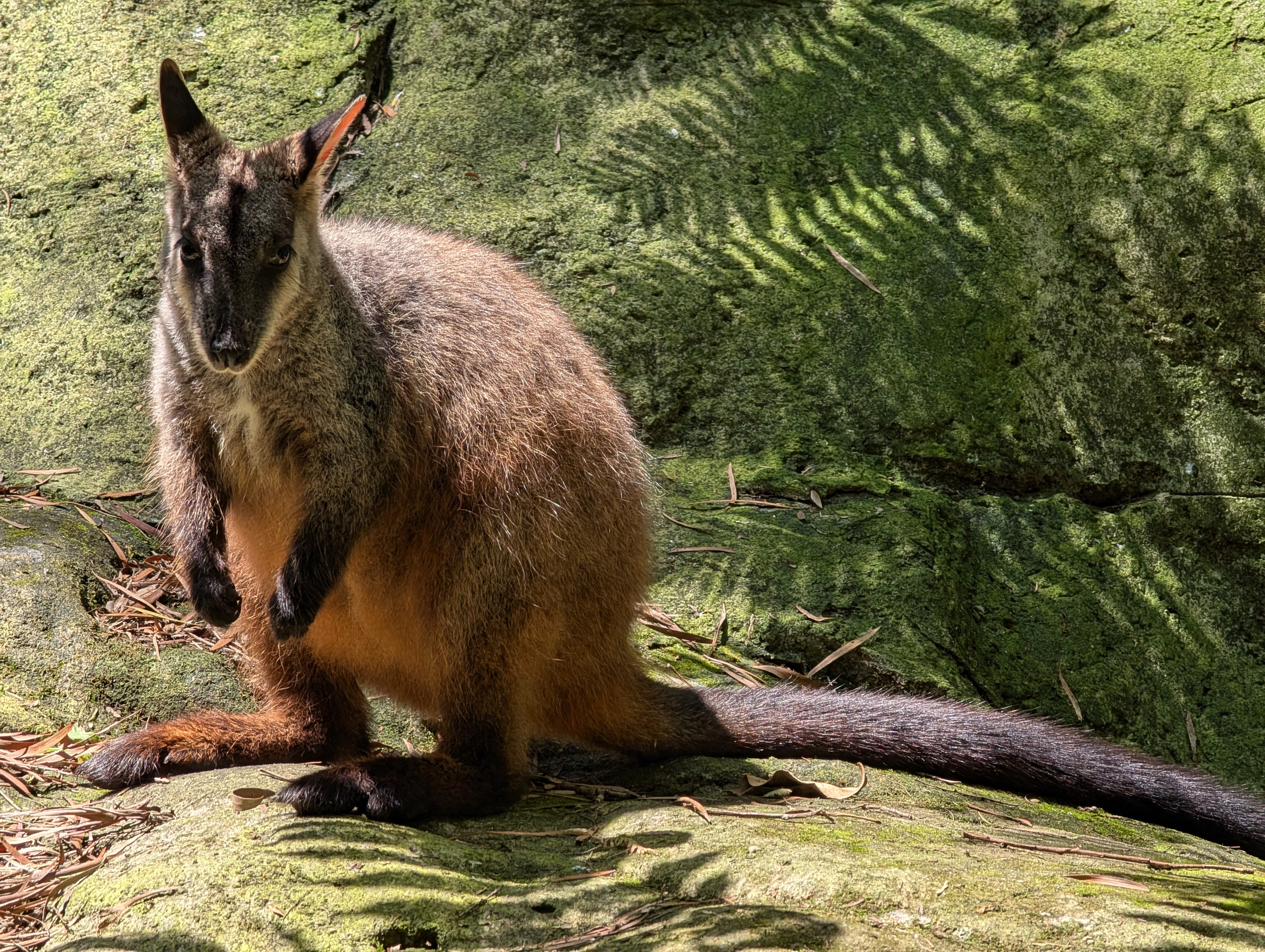
At Taronga ZOO, Sydney, Australia

The coloration of the species in the northern parts of population is paler and fur is shorter in length. The black-footed and flanked species Petrogale lateralis, which occurs in central Australia, is distinguished by its larger size and the shorter and darker fur of the tail and hind parts. Herbert's rock-wallaby (P. herberti) overlaps in the northern range of this species, their coloration is greyer than the warm brown of this species and lighter at the darker features of the limbs; the tail of that species also lacks the blackish features and bushy end. The pads of the feet are well developed and their coarse texture allows good traction on rock surfaces.

== Behaviour ==
The species is able to negotiate difficult rocky terrain with great agility, their compact yet powerful build is assisted by counter-balancing the long tail and feet suited to holding the animal at precarious edges and on inclined surfaces. The species favours north facing refuges, and while largely nocturnal in venturing out from shelter they will bask in winter sun for short periods. Procreation is founded on breeding females utilising a single male for insemination, with births that occur throughout the year. Groups in cooler latitudes or higher altitudes may tend to reproduce in a period between February and May. The females of the colony cohere as maternal groups, with male progeny moving to other groups within the colony or migrating to another location. Individual foraging territories for the species are around 15 hectares, perhaps more for males.

== Distribution and habitat ==
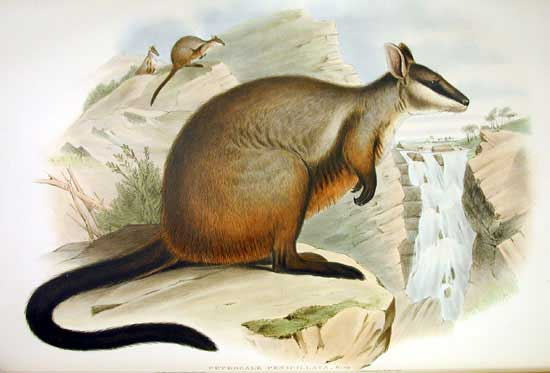
Illustration in Gould's The Mammals of Australia by H. C. Richter, 1863

Found along the Great Dividing Range in fragmented populations that remain after its historical contraction in range from the east and south. The southern edge of the range is the Grampians, and no further west than the Warrumbungles range in New South Wales. The northernmost groups have remained less affected by ecological changes, these are found in southeast Queensland.

Petrogale penicillata shelters during the day in rocky habitat, within vegetation or cavities of preferably complex terrain that allows them to find cooler temperatures and to elude or remain inaccessible to predators. Their great agility while hopping and climbing provides opportunities at ledges, cliff-faces, overhangs, caves and crevices.

== Introduced populations ==
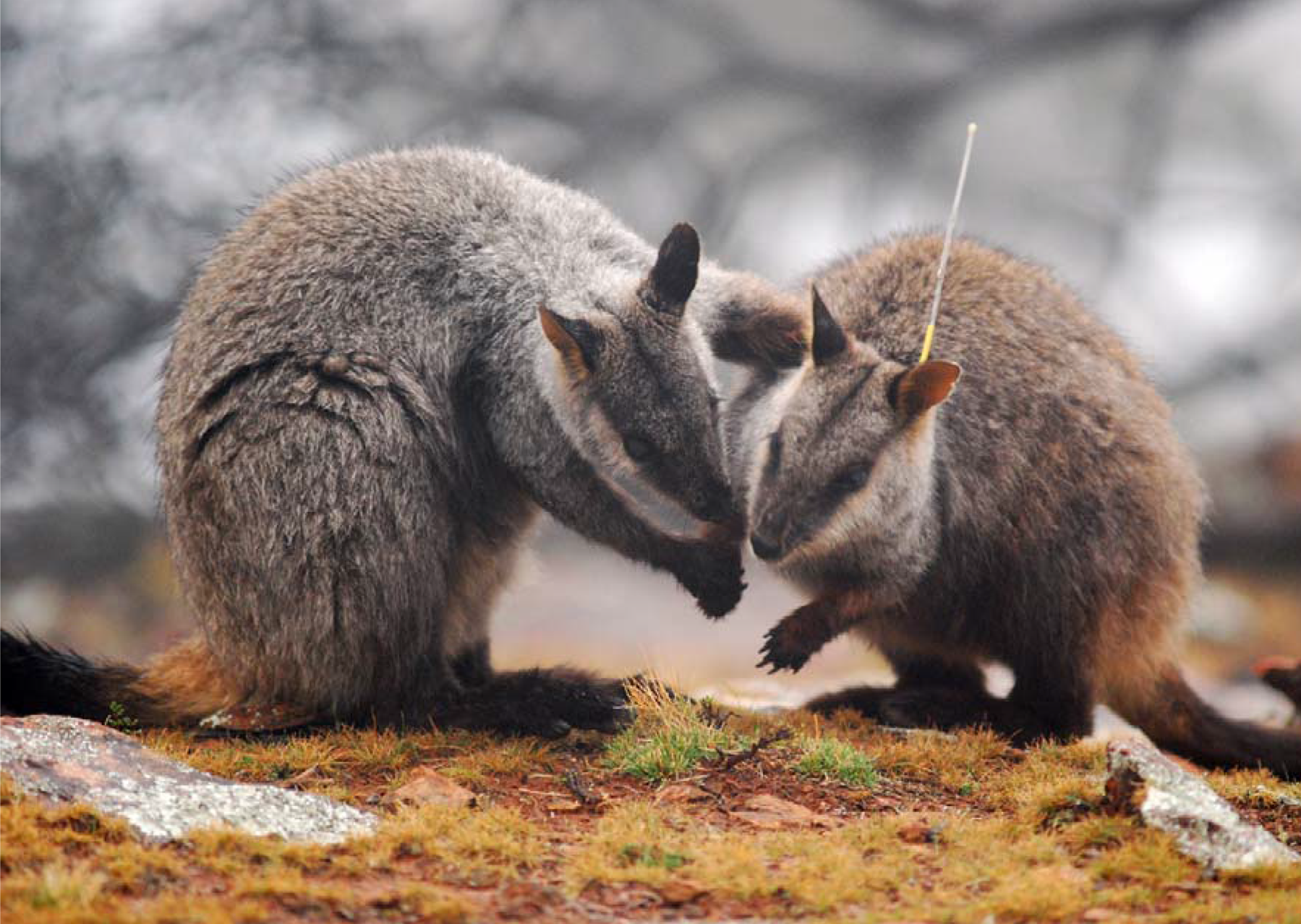
Wearing a collar to conduct animal migration tracking

As part of the acclimatisation movement of the late 1800s, governor Grey introduced this and four other species of wallabies (including the rare parma wallaby) to islands in Hauraki Gulf, near Auckland, New Zealand, where they became well-established. In modern times, these populations have come to be viewed as exotic pests, with severe impacts on the indigenous flora and fauna. As a result, eradication is being undertaken, after initial protection for review of their Australian populations and the return of some wallabies to Australia. Between 1967 and 1975, 210 rock-wallabies were captured on Kawau Island and returned to Australia, along with thousands of other wallabies. Rock-wallabies were removed from Rangitoto and Motutapu Islands during the 1990s, and eradication is now underway on Kawau. Another thirty-three rock-wallabies were captured on Kawau during the 2000s, and returned to Australia, before eradication began.

In 2003 some Kawau brush-tails were relocated to the Waterfall Springs Conservation Park north of Sydney, New South Wales, for captive breeding purposes.

Due to an escape of a pair in 1916, a small breeding population of the brush-tailed rock-wallabies also exists in the Kalihi Valley on the island of Oahu in Hawaii.

Attempts at reintroduction into the Grampians National Park during 2008-12 were not successful, largely due to fox predation. Nevertheless, March 2017 saw the emergence of a fourth offspring, bringing the total number of rock–wallabies present within the Grampians National Park to eight.

== Conservation ==
The Brush-tailed rock wallaby was once common throughout South-East Australia, but due to clearing of native habitat, exotic plant introduction, predation by introduced species and changing fire patterns as a result of climate change they have been wiped out from much of their Southern and Western ranges.

In late 2019 fierce bushfires swept through New South Wales and Victoria, burning protected areas inhabited by the wallaby. It is estimated that 70% of all brush-tailed rock-wallaby habitat was destroyed. In the aftermath of the fires in Victoria, where the wallaby was thought to have been hunted to extinction by the early 20th century by settlers who prized its fur and skin, until some who had survived were discovered in the Grampians in 1970, a colony of 13 has been detected in the Grampians National Park while a further 50 are known to exist in the Snowy River National Park.
