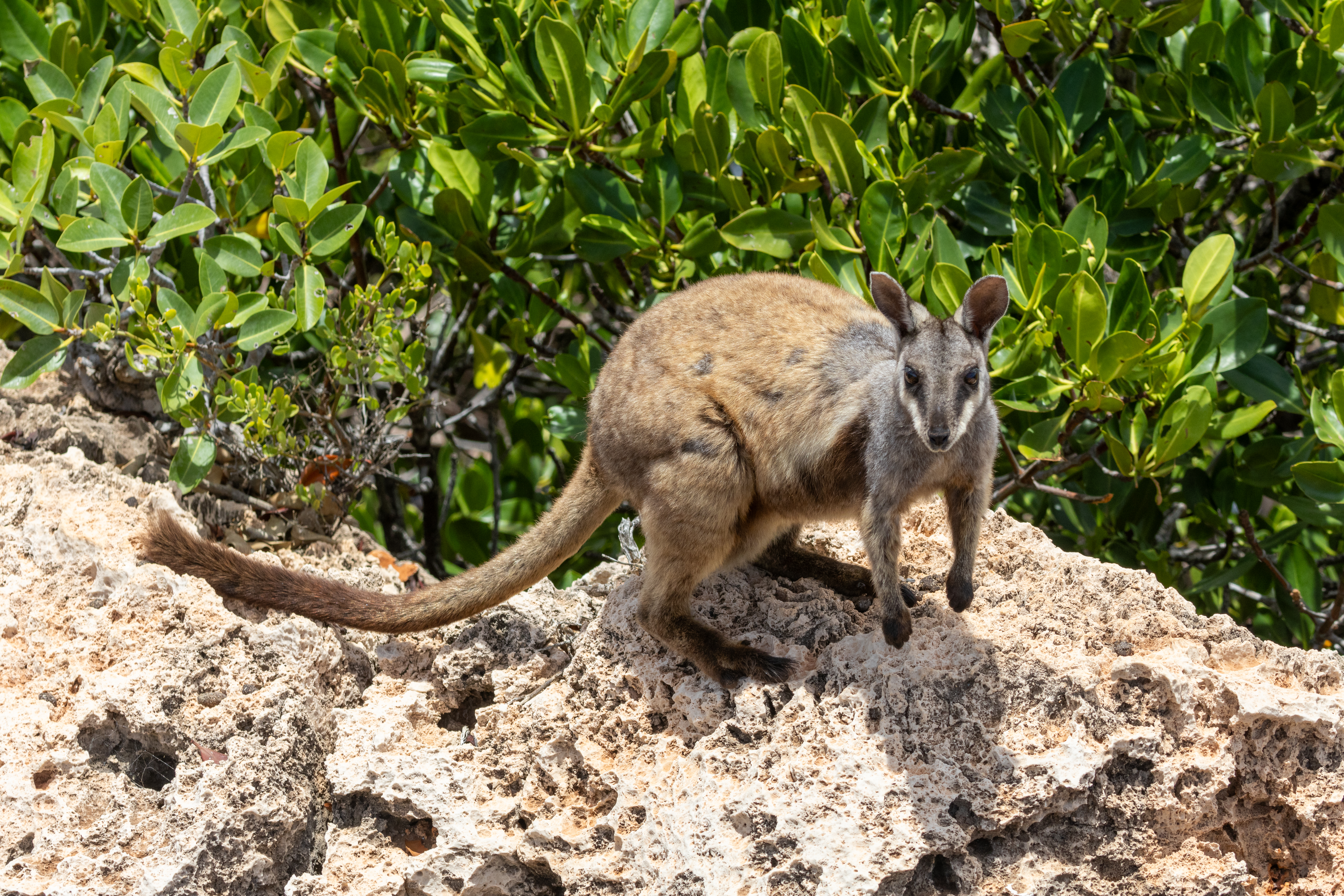

Conservation status
- Vulnerable (IUCN 3.1)

- Endangered (EPBC Act)

Scientific classification
- Kingdom: Animalia
- Phylum: Chordata
- Class: Mammalia
- Infraclass: Marsupialia
- Order: Diprotodontia
- Family: Macropodidae
- Genus: Petrogale
- Species: P. lateralis

Binomial name
- Petrogale lateralis (Gould, 1840)
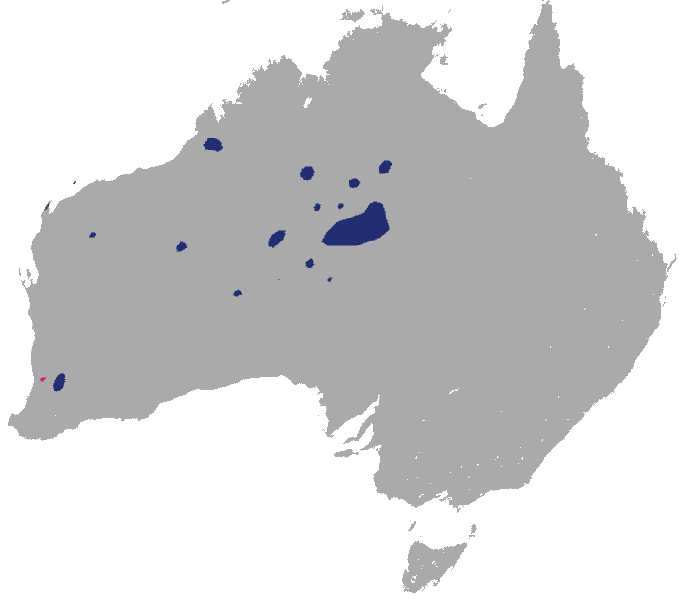
- Black-flanked rock-wallaby range (blue — native, pink — reintroduced)

= Black-flanked rock-wallaby =

Species of marsupial

The black-flanked rock-wallaby (Petrogale lateralis), also known as the black-footed rock-wallaby or warru, is a species of wallaby, one of several rock-wallabies in the genus Petrogale. A shy, nocturnal herbivore, its two main subspecies are found in mostly isolated populations across western and southern Western Australia (WA), the Northern Territory and parts of South Australia (SA). With some subspecies showing a decline in populations in recent years, the whole species is classed as an endangered species under the Commonwealth EPBC Act.

== Taxonomy ==
The species, in the genus Petrogale, was first described by John Gould in 1842. Subspecies include:

- Petrogale lateralis lateralis (Gould, 1840), or warru (the Western Desert Aboriginal name)
- Petrogale lateralis centralis Eldridge & Potter, 2020 (MacDonnell Ranges race)
- Petrogale lateralis kimberleyensis Eldridge & Potter, 2020, or wiliji, West Kimberley rock-wallaby (western Kimberley race)
- Petrogale lateralis hacketti Thomas, 1905, or Recherche rock-wallaby on an island in the Recherche Archipelago
- Petrogale lateralis pearsoni Thomas, 1922, or Pearson Island rock-wallaby

The specimens obtained at the MacDonnell Ranges, and from the Western Kimberley, are distinct enough to be separate subspecies of the black-flanked rock-wallaby. These populations, and the recognised subspecies, are distinguished by chromosomal as well as morphological distinctions.

Petrogale lateralis purpureicollis (purple-necked rock-wallaby) by Le Souef in 1924 is given in some listings, but this is now regarded as a distinct species.

== Description ==
The black-flanked rock-wallaby is generally greyish-brown with a paler belly and chest, a dark stripe running from its head down its spine, and it has a dark tail and feet. Colours may vary slightly among subspecies. It has short, thick, woolly fur that is particularly dense around the base of the tail, rump and flanks. Its long tail, useful for balancing in rocky terrain, is tipped with a brush.

Because most of its water comes from its diet, it rarely drinks and can conserve water by taking refuge from the heat in rocky caves.

== Behaviour ==
The black-flanked rock-wallaby is a rather shy nocturnal animal, and feeds at night on grasslands that are close to rocky areas for shelter.

It lives in groups of 10–100 individuals, and form lifelong pair bonds, although females will mate with other males. They reach sexual maturity at one to two years old, but breeding cycles respond to seasonal rainfall. The species features embryonic diapause, where the embryo's development enters a state of dormancy until environmental conditions are suitable.

The gestation period lasts around 30 days, and like other young marsupials, the young are poorly developed and suckle inside the mother's pouch until they are ready to leave. Unlike other kangaroos and wallabies, mothers leave their young in a sheltered place while they feed.

== Distribution and habitat ==
In Western Australia, the wallaby lives in mountainous areas with granite outcrops, sandstone cliffs, scree slopes, and hummock grasses with a few trees and shrubs, and also near coastal limestone cliffs. P. lateralis lateralis lives across southern and western WA; P. lateralis hacketti lives on three islands of the Recherche Archipelago in southern WA; P. lateralis (western Kimberley race) is found only in the Edgar Range, Erskine Range, possibly the Grant Range and also nearby areas of the west Kimberley); P. lateralis (MacDonnell Ranges race) used to be widespread in central desert regions across the Northern Territory, SA and WA, but there has been a decline in both distribution and abundance.

== Conservation status ==
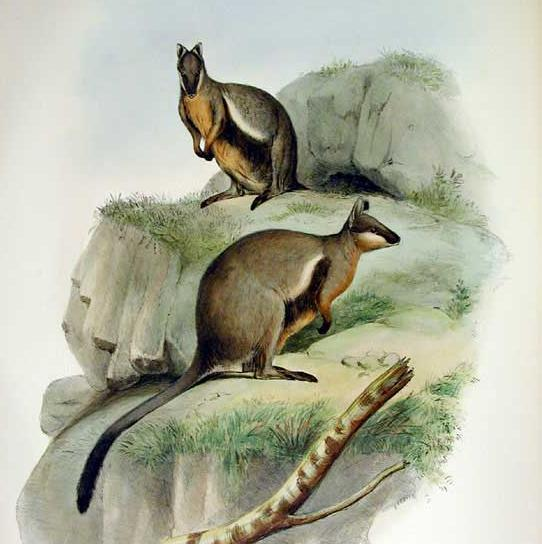
Illustration from Gould's Mammals of Australia, 1863

Predation by introduced foxes and feral cats, habitat damage caused by sheep, goats and rabbits, invasive species, climate change and alteration of fire regimes have caused the population to decline. Several sites where populations occur are protected, and a recovery plan is under way. Fox control has been established at several sites.

Petrogale lateralis lateralis has suffered the worst decline of population, while Petrogale lateralis hacketti and Petrogale lateralis (western Kimberley race) had had no recorded decline in Western Australia by 2012.

- IUCN: On the IUCN Red List, it is listed as Vulnerable (last assessed 2014).
- Commonwealth Government: Previously listed as vulnerable under the EPBC Act in 2009, since 7 December 2016 and as of 2021 the wallaby is classed as endangered (including all subspecies). It was also determined that it requires a recovery plan.
- Government of Western Australia: Classed as endangered under the Biodiversity Conservation Act 2016 (WA).

== Conservation measures ==
The populations in Western Australia are managed by the Western Australian Department of Biodiversity, Conservation and Attractions, consisting of control of foxes and monitoring.

The state government reported that there were just 50 animals left in the wild in South Australia in 2007. In October 2007, 15 wallabies were moved into an open-range zoo which undertakes breeding programs for endangered species, Monarto Zoo. The animals came from the Pukatja/Ernabella area and another undisclosed location in the Anangu Pitjantjatjara Yankunytjatjara (APY) Lands. Work to monitor the species' survival was said to involve Aboriginal trackers and schoolchildren from Pukatja to help track the wallabies' movements.

Previously widespread throughout the ranges of central Australia, the warru was as of July 2019 South Australia's most endangered mammal, primarily due to predation by foxes and feral cats. However Monarto has had some success in breeding the wallabies, and has helped to establish a viable population (22) of the wallabies in a 1 square kilometre (0.39 sq mi) fenced area, known as the Pintji, in the APY lands. In June 2017 Monarto announced that 25 of the population bred at Pintji, along with 15 others, had been released into the wild. These will be monitored and feral animal control measures are in place.

In August 2021, the federal government's National Indigenous Australians Agency, which had been funding the Warru Kaninytjaku Indigenous ranger program in the APY Lands for 10 years, announced that funding would continue for at least seven more years. The rangers manage two warru populations, in the Musgrave Ranges and Tomkinson Ranges, and have helped to build the numbers up from around 20 to hundreds. With new funding, the program included the Everard Ranges, which is important because multiple populations mean that if one is lost, warru from another population could be re-introduced from one of the others. In August 2022, 25 warru that had been raised in the pintji, along with another 15 taken from a wild population, were released in the Everard Ranges, with tracking devices for monitoring by the rangers. These were the first warru to inhabit the area in around 60 years.

== Ecological and cultural significance ==
The warru is an important part of the local ecosystem, as its consumption of the native vegetation helps to regenerate it. In addition, it is an important symbol in Anangu mythology.
