= Cytonuclear discordance =

Cytonuclear discordance, also known as mitonuclear discordance, mito-nuclear discordance, or nuclear-mitochondrial discordance, describes the discrepancy in phylogenetic relationships using mitochondrial DNA (mtDNA) versus nuclear genes (or nuclear DNA, nDNA). In other words, mitochondrial and nuclear gene sequences may lead to different, if not contradictory, phylogenetic trees that show the relationships among species. In theory, nuclear DNA and mtDNA sequences should lead to similar phylogenetic tree topologies among species but this is often not the case.

== Examples ==
An example among mammals are Australian rock-wallabies (Petrogale) in which several species form a monophyletic group with nDNA genes, but not with mtDNA. This cytonuclear discordance involves at least four operational taxonomic units (OTUs) across four species. Similarly, voles of the genus Microtus show cyto-nuclear discordance.

Another example among insects is the relationship among some gomphocerine grasshoppers. Phylogenies based on complete mitogenomes recovered some species as para- or polyphyletic. By contrast, a phylogeny based on nuclear genes derived from transcriptomic data retrieved all species as monophyletic clusters.

Many other taxonomic groups display cytonuclear discordance, e.g. reptiles such as Burmese pythons, vipers of the genus Cerastes, geckos of the genera Cyrtodactylus and Homonota, or skinks of the genus Spondylurus.
