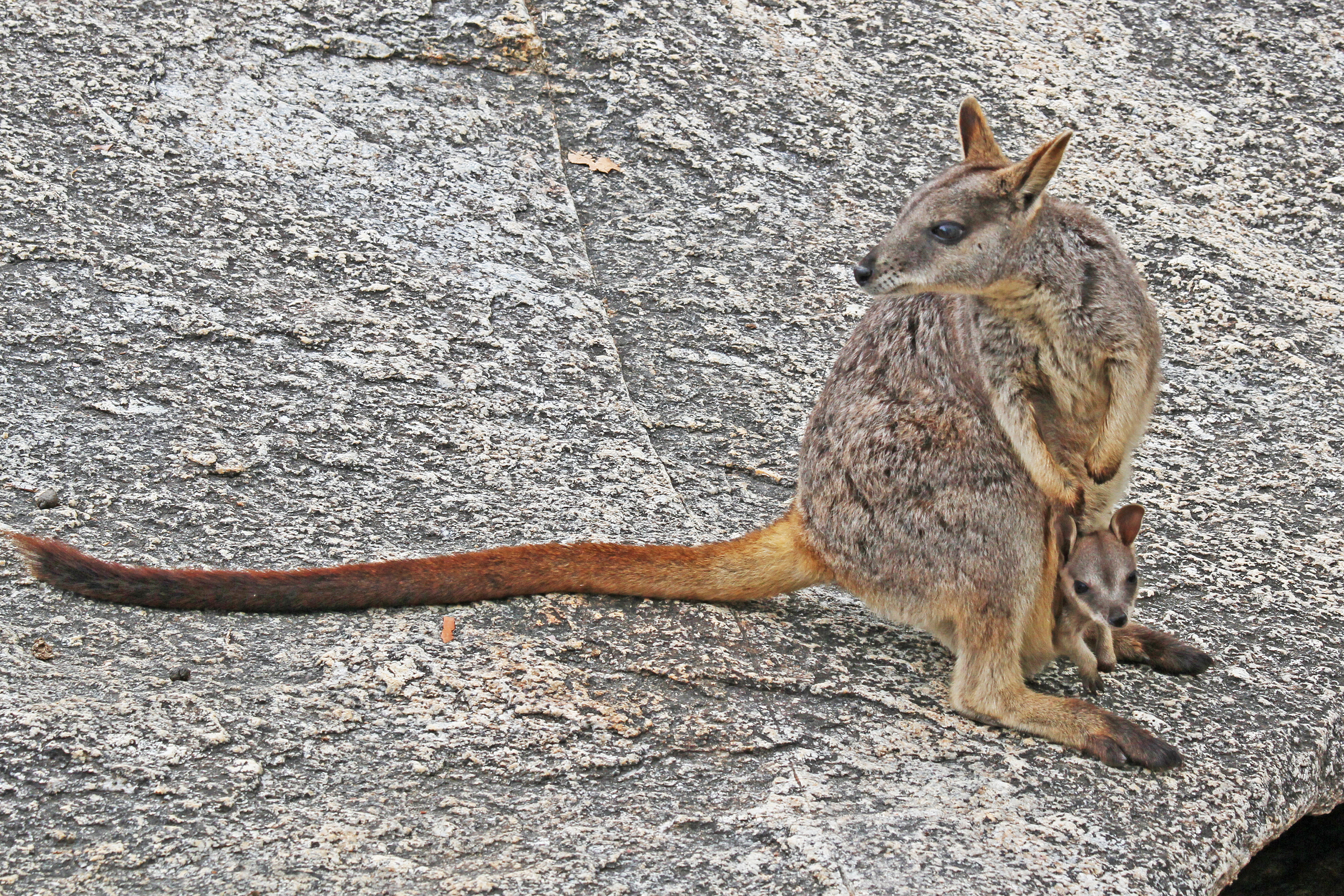
- Mareeba rock-wallaby with joey

Conservation status
- Near Threatened (IUCN 3.1)

Scientific classification
- Kingdom: Animalia
- Phylum: Chordata
- Class: Mammalia
- Infraclass: Marsupialia
- Order: Diprotodontia
- Family: Macropodidae
- Genus: Petrogale
- Species: P. mareeba

Binomial name
- Petrogale mareeba Eldridge & Close, 1992
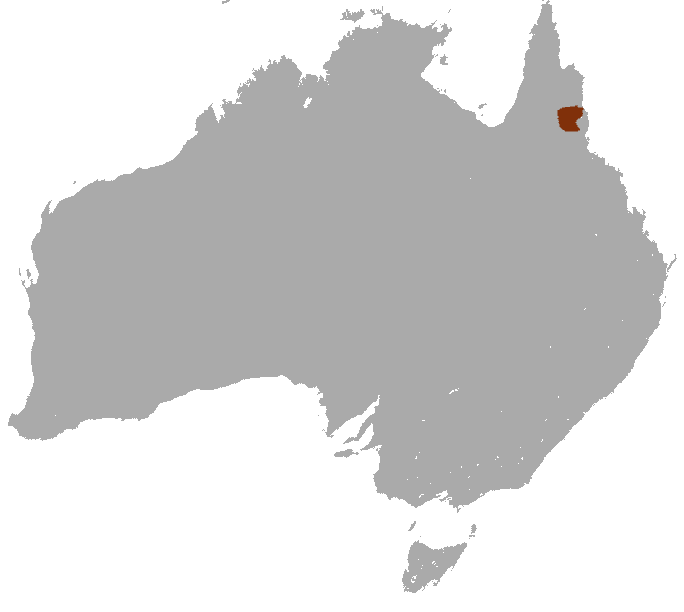
- Mareeba rock-wallaby range (brown), within Australia

= Mareeba rock-wallaby =

Species of marsupial

The Mareeba rock-wallaby (Petrogale mareeba) is a rare species of rock-wallaby found around Mareeba in northeastern Queensland, Australia.

== Taxonomy ==
The Mareeba rock-wallaby is a member of a group of seven very closely related species within the genus Petrogale, which also includes the Cape York rock-wallaby (P. coenensis), the unadorned rock-wallaby (P. inornata) and the allied rock-wallaby (P. assimilis). It was only identified as a separate species in 1992. Both the common name and the Latin specific epithet reflect the distribution of this species around the settlement of Mareeba.

== Distribution and habitat ==
The Mareeba rock-wallaby is a rare species, found in the highlands west of Cairns from around Mount Garnet to the Mitchell River and Mount Carbine, and inland to Mungana, but only on the tops of a couple of mountain ranges. The animals can be seen in their natural habitat in the Granite Gorge Nature Park, about 60 kilometres (37 mi) inland from Cairns.

== Conservation ==
=== Classification ===
Although rare, and a near-threatened species under IUCN classification, the animal is classed as one of "Least concern" under Queensland's Nature Conservation Act 1992.

=== Survival after bushfires ===
After a huge fire raged through the Yourka Reserve near Einasleigh, run by Bush Heritage Australia in December 2019, part of the 2019–2020 bushfires in Australia, it was feared that the rock-wallaby population might not survive. However, it was found that the population was thriving, with several new joeys spotted in their mothers' pouches, using motion-sensing cameras. Reserve manager Paul Hales said that they had been conducting cool burns for years to reduce dense tree foliage, which had prevented the growth of native grasses such as cockatoo grass and kangaroo grass. Still, the December fire had helped to thin out the trees even more, "with daylight reaching the ground for the first time in 25 years". The renewed growth would help to support the survival of the ground-dwelling native animals.
