= Yourka Reserve =

Australian nature reserve

Coordinates: 17.943°S 145.403°E

Yourka Reserve is a 43,500–hectare nature reserve in Far North Queensland, Australia. It is a former cattle station in the Einasleigh Uplands bioregion on the western edge of the Wet Tropics of Queensland World Heritage Site, 130 km south of Cairns, with the nearest town being Ravenshoe. It is owned and managed by Bush Heritage Australia (BHA), by which it was purchased in 2007.

== Landscape and vegetation ==
Yourka has a diverse topography and soils, ranging in altitude from 500 to 900 m asl with the highest and wettest land in the eastern part of the reserve. Its vegetation includes wet eucalypt forest communities in the east, changing to drier eucalypt woodlands in the west. The upper Herbert River and various creeks flow through the property.

A huge fire raged through the reserve in December 2019 as part of the particularly severe 2019-20 Australian bushfire season, destroying a lot of vegetation, but it had helped to reduce dense tree foliage which had prevented the growth of native grasses such as cockatoo grass and kangaroo grass. Cool burning is conducted regularly in the reserve to help maintain the native grasses and other plants.

== Fauna ==
Threatened mammal species likely to be found on the property include the rufous bettong and the greater glider. Birds include masked owl and red goshawk. A major management issue is the need to control feral animals.

The Mareeba rock-wallaby has staged a comeback after the December 2019 fire.
