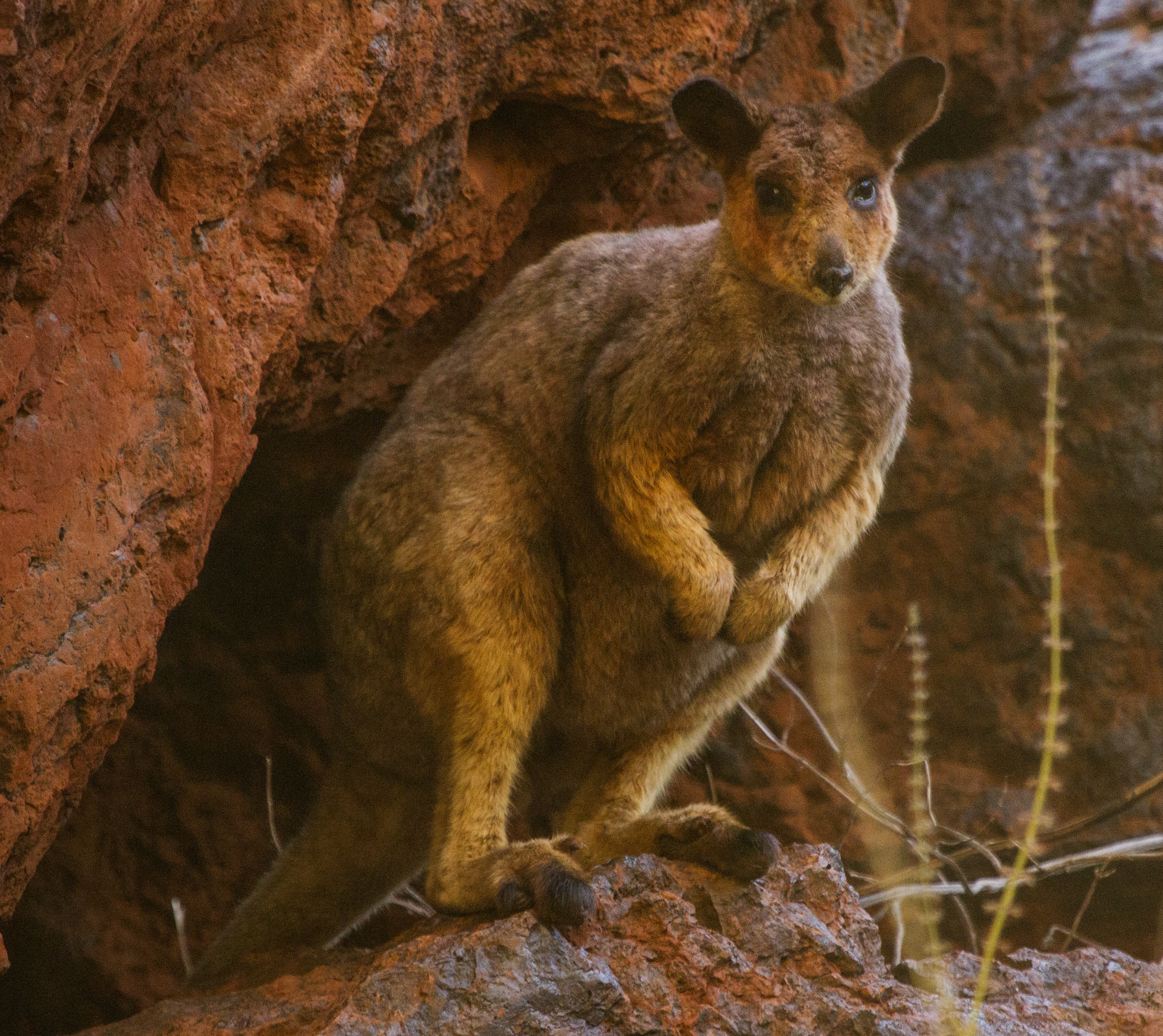
- Rothschild's rock-wallaby

Scientific classification
- Kingdom: Animalia
- Phylum: Chordata
- Class: Mammalia
- Infraclass: Marsupialia
- Order: Diprotodontia
- Family: Macropodidae
- Subfamily: Macropodinae
- Genus: Petrogale; J. E. Gray, 1837

Type species
- Kangurus pencillatus J. E. Gray, 1827

Species
- 19, see text

= Rock-wallaby =

Genus of marsupials

The rock-wallabies are the wallabies of the genus Petrogale. (Note: From Latin petr- = rock + Greek galé = weasel)

== Description ==
A genus with a high degree of speciation, driven in part by their fidelity to complex habitats that are phylogeographically isolated, Petrogale is the most diverse macropod genus, with workers identifying 19 species and further cryptic taxa in taxonomic revisions to 2014. The genus occur in a weight range of 1–12 kilograms (2.2–26.5 lb), being relatively small to medium-sized marsupials. Males are slightly larger than females, with a body length of up to 59 centimetres (23 in) and a 70 centimetres (28 in) long tail

=== Behavior ===
The extremely agile and often colourful rock-wallabies live where rocky, rugged and steep terrain can provide daytime refuge; they are nocturnal and live a fortress-like existence spending their days in steep, rocky, complex terrain in some kind of shelter (a cave, overhang, or vegetation) and ranging out into surrounding terrain at night to feed. The greatest activity occurs three hours before sunrise and after sunset.

Their reliance on refuges leads to the rock-wallabies living in small groups or colonies, with individuals having overlapping home ranges of about 15 ha (37 acres) each. Within their colonies, they seem to be highly territorial with a male's territory overlapping one or a number of female territories. Even at night, the rock-wallabies do not move further than two kilometres from their home refuges.

Generally, there are three categories of habitat that the different species of rock-wallaby seem to prefer:

- Loose piles of large boulders containing a maze of passageways
- Cliffs with many mid-level ledges and caves
- Isolated rock stacks, usually sheer sided and often girdled with fallen boulders

Suitable habitat is limited and patchy and has led to varying degrees of isolation of colonies and a genetic differentiation specific to these colonies.

== Taxonomy ==
The genus was established in 1837 by John Edward Gray in a revision of material at the British Museum of Natural History. Gray nominated his earlier described taxon of Kangurus pencillatus as the type species, which is now recognised as Petrogale penicillata, the brush-tailed rock-wallaby. The author separated the species from the defunct genus Kangurus, which he proposed to divide in his synopsis of the known macropod species.

The following is a list of species, with common names, arranged by alliances of species groups:

- Genus Petrogale
  - P. brachyotis species group
    - Short-eared rock-wallaby, Petrogale brachyotis
    - Monjon, Petrogale burbidgei
    - Nabarlek, Petrogale concinna
    - Eastern short-eared rock-wallaby, Petrogale wilkinsi
  - P. xanthopus species group
    - Proserpine rock-wallaby, Petrogale persephone
    - Rothschild's rock-wallaby, Petrogale rothschildi
    - Yellow-footed rock-wallaby, Petrogale xanthopus
  - P. lateralis/penicillata species group
    - Allied rock-wallaby, Petrogale assimilis
    - Cape York rock-wallaby, Petrogale coenensis
    - Godman's rock-wallaby, Petrogale godmani
    - Herbert's rock-wallaby, Petrogale herberti
    - Unadorned rock-wallaby, Petrogale inornata
    - Black-flanked rock-wallaby, Petrogale lateralis
    - Mareeba rock-wallaby, Petrogale mareeba
    - Brush-tailed rock-wallaby, Petrogale penicillata
    - Purple-necked rock-wallaby, Petrogale purpureicollis
    - Mount Claro rock-wallaby, Petrogale sharmani

The species groups listed above have been confirmed by genetic analysis and their relationships have been well studied, especially in the brachyotis group. However, these studies also revealed that mitochondrial and nuclear DNA sequences resulted in different phylogenetic trees, a phenomenon called cytonuclear discordance.

== Conservation ==
Their total numbers and range have been drastically reduced since European colonisation, with populations becoming extinct in the south.

The ongoing extinction of colonies in recent times is of particular concern. In 1988 at Jenolan Caves in New South Wales, for example, a caged population of 80 rock-wallabies was released to boost what was thought to be an abundant local wild population. By 1992, the total population was down to about seven. The survivors were caught and enclosed in a fox and cat-proof enclosure, and the numbers in this captive population have since begun to increase.

Scientists consider red foxes the major reason for the recent extinctions, along with competing herbivores, especially goats, sheep and rabbits, diseases such as toxoplasmosis and hydatidosis, habitat fragmentation and destruction, and a lower genetic health due to the increasing isolation of colonies.

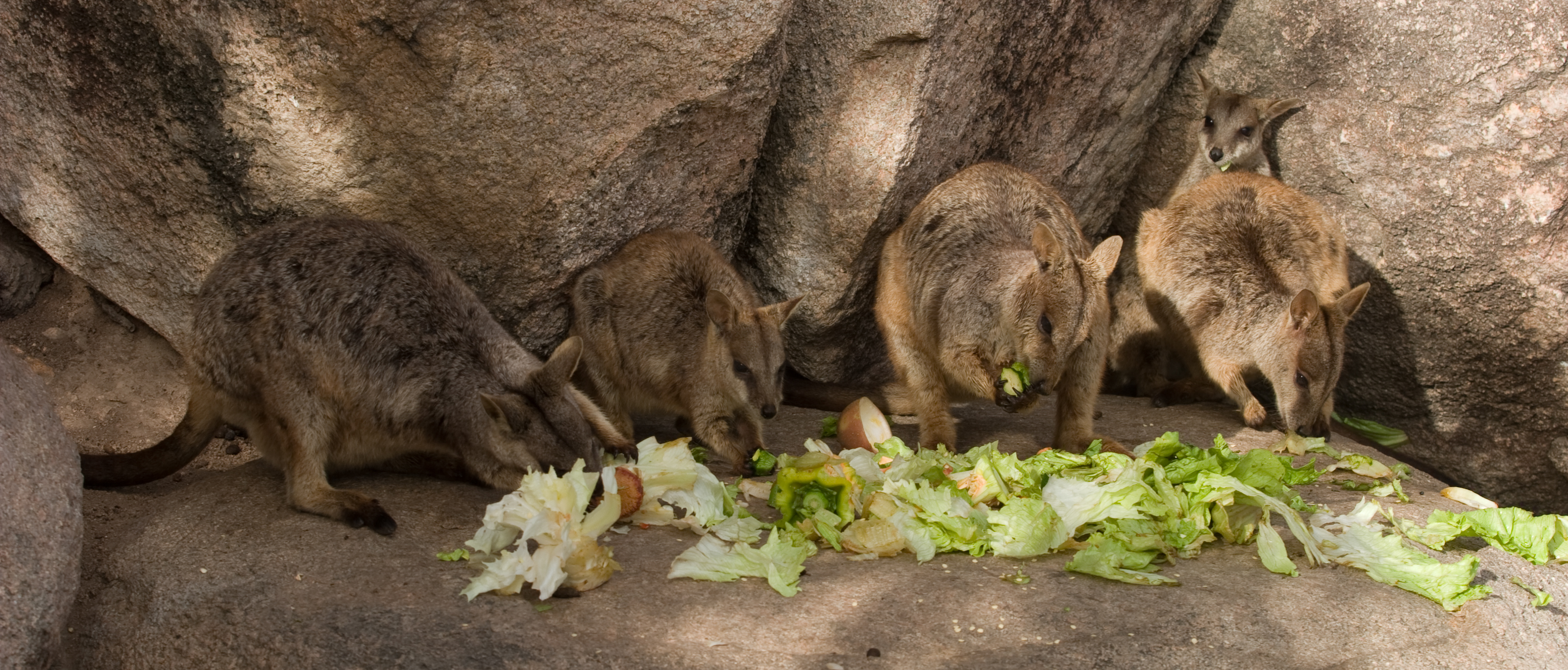
Allied rock wallabies being fed on Magnetic Island

Habitat conservation and pest management addressing red foxes and goats appear to be the most urgent recovery actions to save the various species.

The national recovery team with support from non-government organisations such as the Foundation for National Parks & Wildlife has implemented various programs ranging from land acquisition to captive breeding and awareness raising projects.

Monitoring programs are implemented to register any changes in population sizes. Surveys and analysis establish the genetic diversity of populations. Red fox and goat eradication aid the survival of local populations, and captive breeding programs are used as an 'insurance policy' to build up rock-wallaby numbers to boost wild populations.

In the case of the yellow-footed rock-wallaby, these strategies have prevented the extinction of the species in New South Wales.
