= Herbert Smith (mineralogist) =

British mineralogist (1872–1953)

Herbert Smith CBE
- Born: 26 May 1872; Edgbaston, England
- Died: 20 April 1953 (aged 80)
- Education: Winchester College
- Alma mater: New College, Oxford
- Known for: Gemstones (1912)
- Scientific career
- Fields: Mineralogy, gemmology
- Workplaces: British Museum (Natural History), London

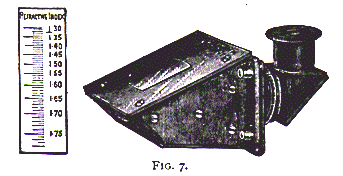
Herbert Smith's refractometer

George Frederick Herbert Smith CBE (26 May 1872 – 20 April 1953) was a British mineralogist who worked for the British Museum (Natural History). He discovered the mineral paratacamite in 1906, and developed a jeweller's refractometer for the rapid identification of gems. The minerals smithite and herbertsmithite are named after him, as is Herbert's rock-wallaby.

== Career ==
Smith was born in 1872, went to school at Winchester College and then to New College, Oxford. In Oxford, he studied mathematics from 1891 to 1895, gaining first class marks, and then graduated in physics in 1896. Smith was appointed as an assistant in the British Museum (Natural History) in December 1896. He worked in the mineralogy department of the museum until 1921, when he became assistant secretary of the museum, succeeding Charles E. Fagan.

In his mineralogical career, Smith worked on topics including the determination of mineral structures and compositions. He wrote papers on the structure of the gold telluride mineral calaverite (AuTe_{2}); and he described the new copper-zinc oxychloride mineral paratacamite. Smith also developed new instruments for the practical measurement of the crystallographic and optical features of minerals and gems (goniometers and a refractometer), and wrote a text book on gemstones and gemmology that was first published in 1912, and went through many editions, with the thirteenth edition published posthumously after revisions by F.C. Phillips 1958.

In his role as secretary of the museum, he oversaw the expansion of the museum and the creation of new buildings for the department of entomology; and he was in charge of the celebrations of the 50th anniversary of the Natural History museum in 1931. He also started the practice of selling postcards of museum items, and established a sports club for the staff of the museum. He served as secretary of the museum until 1935, before returning to the mineralogical department for two years before retirement. He retired in 1937.

In 1927, in conjunction with the Society of Civil Servants, Smith arranged for a special train to take civil servants to Richmond, Yorkshire, to view the solar eclipse. Smith provided pieces of smoked glass for viewing, and wrote a guide to the eclipse. Richmond was in the line of totality, and many thousands of visitors attended on fleets of special excursion trains that day, including Virginia Woolf, who described the events in her diary and in a 1928 essay The Sun and the Fish. At totality, the Sun was obscured by clouds.

== Professional service ==
In 1918, Smith helped to establish the Society of Civil Servants 'to cover the middle and upper grades of the service'. He was honorary secretary of this society from 1918 to 1925, vice-president from 1925 to 1928, and president for the period 1928 to 1932.

Smith played a major role in the professional work of gemmologists in the United Kingdom. He set and marked the first diploma in gemmology (from 1912), and was later an examiner for the Gemmological Association of Great Britain (Gem-A) from 1931 to 1951. He was elected president of the association from 1942 to 1953, and was awarded the title of honorary fellow in 1946.

Smith served on the council of the Royal Albert Hall from 1930 to 1953, and worked for many years for the society for the promotion of nature reserves, which eventually became the UK government agency, Nature Conservancy in 1948 and the National Parks Commission in 1949.

== Recognition ==
In 1905, mineralogist R H Solly named a silver arsenic sulphide mineral (AgAsS_{2}) smithite after Smith. This mineral was from the Lengenbach Quarry in the Binn valley, Switzerland. At that time, Smith was working on other minerals from the same location. In 2004, a copper zinc oxychloride mineral (ZnCu_{3}(OH)_{6}Cl_{2}) herbertsmithite was named after Smith, since it was found to share chemical and structural features with paratacamite, which Smith had discovered in 1906.

In 1926, Herbert's rock-wallaby, Petrogale herberti was named in Smith's honour, to reflect the assistance he had provided to Hubert Wilkins, on whose expedition the wallaby had been discovered.

In June 1949, Smith was awarded the CBE for 'services to the flora and fauna of the British Isles'.

== Family ==
Smith married Rosalie Ellerton (d. 1936), and they had a daughter. Smith died on 20 April 1953, after a short illness.
