= Cape York rock-wallaby =

Conservation status
- Endangered (IUCN 3.1)

Scientific classification
- Kingdom: Animalia
- Phylum: Chordata
- Class: Mammalia
- Infraclass: Marsupialia
- Order: Diprotodontia
- Family: Macropodidae
- Genus: Petrogale
- Species: P. coenensis

Binomial name
- Petrogale coenensis Eldridge & Close, 1992
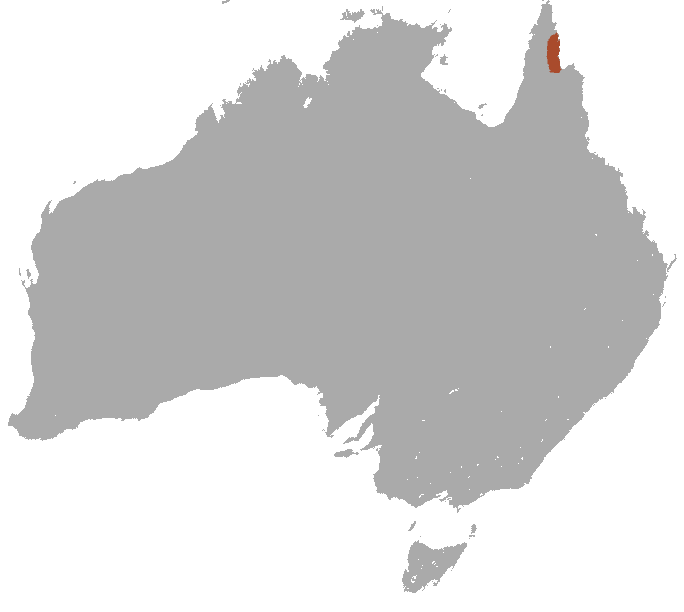
- Cape York rock-wallaby range

Species of marsupial

The Cape York rock-wallaby (Petrogale coenensis) is a species of rock-wallaby restricted to Cape York Peninsula in northeastern Queensland, Australia. It is a member of a group of seven very closely related rock-wallabies, all found in northeastern Queensland, also including the Mount Claro rock-wallaby (P. sharmani), the Mareeba rock-wallaby (P. mareeba) and Godman's rock-wallaby (P. godmani).

The Cape York rock-wallaby is found only in central Cape York, from the Musgrave to the Pascoe River. It is also the only member of the group of seven species to be completely separated geographically from its relatives; it is separated from Godman's rock-wallaby by the Hann River Catchment (around 70 km).

== Taxonomy ==
This species was first described in 1923 by Eldridge and Close and later reviewed and properly classified after taxonomic revisions. The Cape York rock-wallaby falls under the mammalian class within the Animalia kingdom. Also, a member of Macropodidae family with a genus of Petrogale. The Cape York Rock-Wallaby belongs to the order Diprotodontia closely related to koalas and wombats. The members of this order typically have two large lower incisors.

== Description and habitat ==
This wallaby is a relatively small macropod with its physical characteristics suited for their rocky terrains. An adult wallaby has a head to body length of 15-20in and a tail length of 16-22in. Their tails are typically as long as or longer than their bodies. An adult Cape York Rock-Wallaby has a body mass of about 6.6-13.2lb.

These wallabies can be identified distinctly by their greyish to brown fur, with a darker back and a pale underside. Their ears are short and rounded. Like other wallabies, the Cape York Rock-Wallaby has powerful hindlimbs for jumping, short forelimbs for balance and climbing, and a long tail to counterbalance navigating cliffsides. Their feet are rough and have padded soles modified for grip on rocky surfaces.

Endemic to the Cape York Peninsula in northeastern, Australia, the Cape York Rock-Wallaby occupies multiple habitats such as granite boulder piles, areas with crevices and caves, rocky cliffs, and sandstone outcrops. The environments, mostly rocky, protect this species from predators and weather. The Cape York Rock-Wallaby usually stays within the caves and crevices during daytime and emerges at night for foraging.

== Ecological Significance and Social Behavior ==
Since Cape York Rock-Wallabies are herbivores, they play a crucial role within the ecosystem. They aid in dispersing plant seeds and maintaining their habitat's health. Wallabies promote biodiversity by feeding on multiple types of vegetation, eliminating invasives. By grazing, they maintain an even balance of plant species not allowing a specific plant to dominate regions.

The Cape York-Rock Wallaby are an isolated species and spend most of their lives alone or in small groups. Though, their social behavior derives from pressures in the environment and the amount of food available. When it is time to find a mate, males can be observed competing by revealing their agility in strength to female companions.

== Conservation and Human Impact ==
Due to deforestation, agriculture, and urban development, the Cape York Rock-Wallaby can be found on the endangered species list. There is an estimate of 500-2000 remaining mature individuals in the population. There are some habitat restoration projects and fencing to help combat the declining population. Since this wallaby is not a migrant species, there is a real challenge with maintaining a stable population size.
