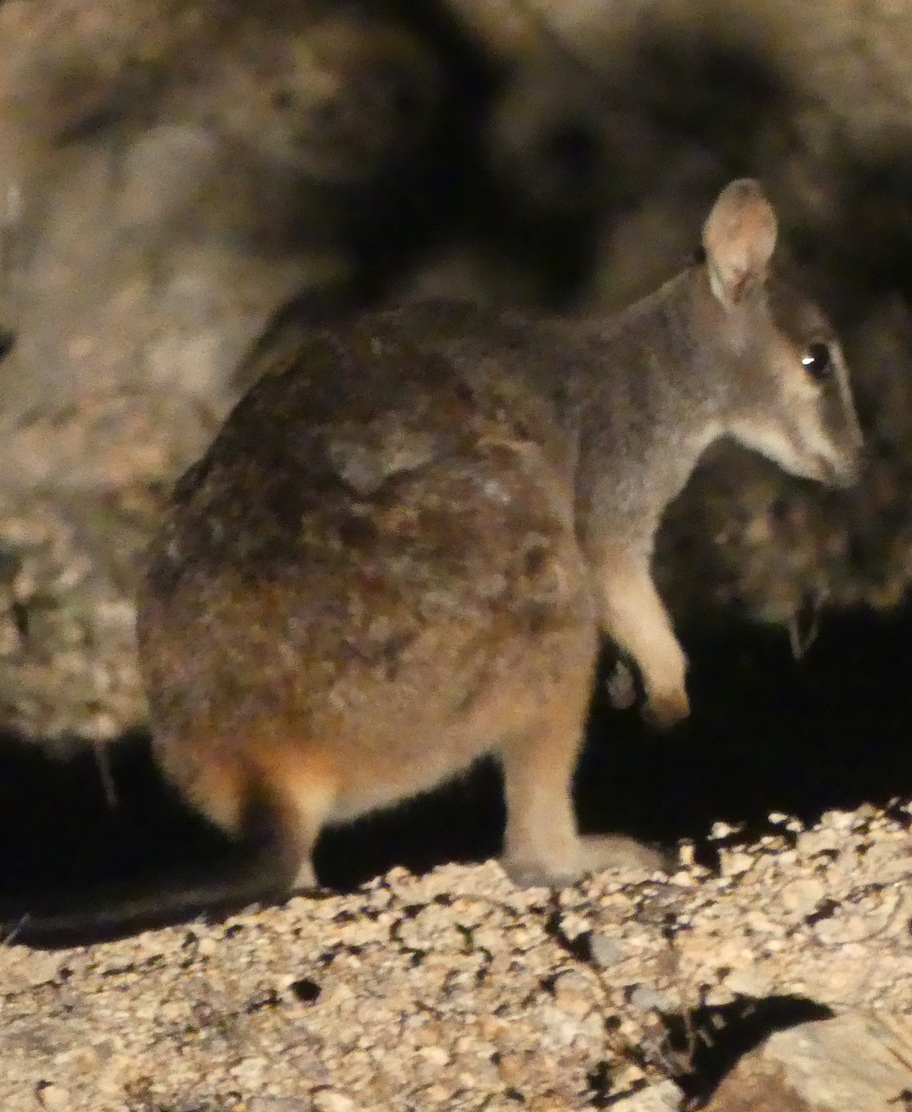

Conservation status
- Vulnerable (IUCN 3.1)

Scientific classification
- Kingdom: Animalia
- Phylum: Chordata
- Class: Mammalia
- Infraclass: Marsupialia
- Order: Diprotodontia
- Family: Macropodidae
- Genus: Petrogale
- Species: P. sharmani

Binomial name
- Petrogale sharmani Eldridge & Close, 1992
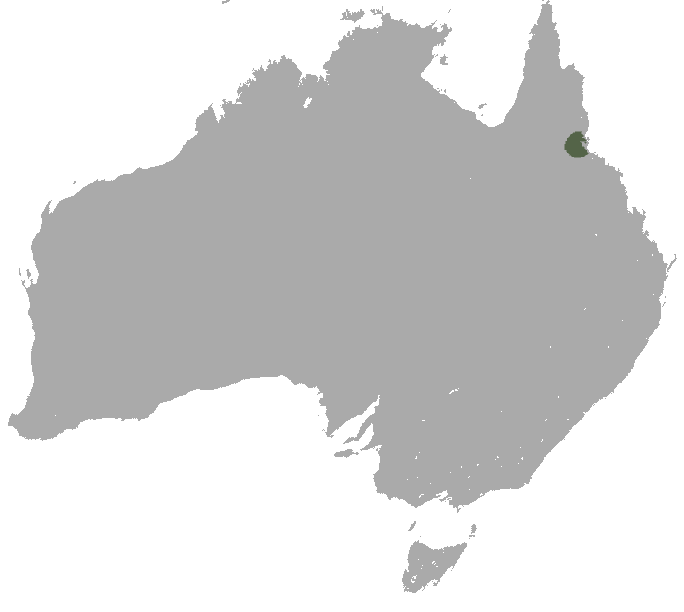
- Mount Claro rock wallaby range

= Mount Claro rock-wallaby =

Species of marsupial

The Mount Claro rock-wallaby (Petrogale sharmani), also known as Sharman's rock-wallaby, is a species of rock-wallaby found in northeastern Queensland, Australia. It is a member of a group of seven very closely related species also including Godman's rock-wallaby (P. godmani) and Herbert's rock-wallaby (P. herberti).

== Description ==
It measures 43 to 53 cm high, and its tail is about 50 cm. It weighs 3.6 to 4.8 kg. The upper body is greyish-brown, There is very little difference about this species and the six other species of petrogales found in this region; the difference were made only by genetic studies (it has 20 chromosomes). It is the smallest of the genus and one of the rarest.

== Habitat ==
The Mount Claro rock-wallaby is the smallest of the group, and also has one of the smallest ranges. It is completely restricted to the Seaview and Coane Range west of Ingham.

== Diet ==
It feeds on grass shoots, fruits, seeds and flowers by hand-feeding.
