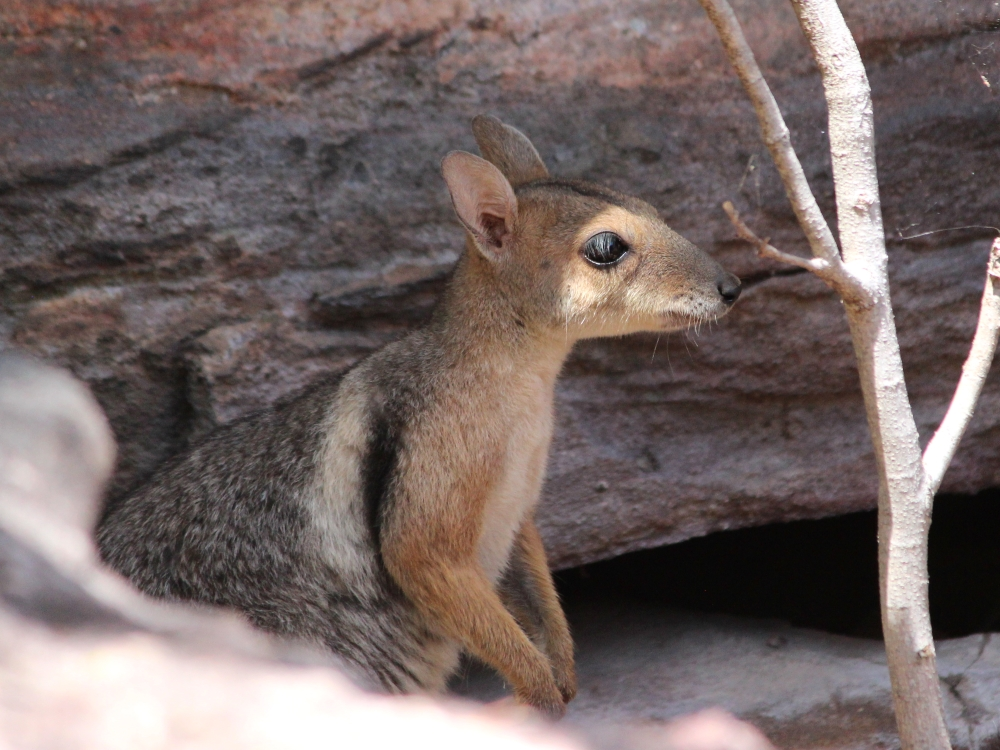

Conservation status
- Least Concern (IUCN 3.1)

Scientific classification
- Kingdom: Animalia
- Phylum: Chordata
- Class: Mammalia
- Infraclass: Marsupialia
- Order: Diprotodontia
- Family: Macropodidae
- Genus: Petrogale
- Species: P. wilkinsi

Binomial name
- Petrogale wilkinsi Thomas, 1926

= Eastern short-eared rock-wallaby =

Species of marsupial

The eastern short-eared rock-wallaby or Wilkins' rock-wallaby (Petrogale wilkinsi) is a species of rock-wallaby found in the northernmost parts of the Northern Territory of Australia, and is common in the Kakadu and Litchfield National Parks. It was thought to be a subpopulation of the short-eared rock-wallaby Petrogale brachyotis found in the Kimberley (Western Australia), but recent genetic and morphological studies have shown it to be distinct. Wilkins' rock-wallaby is smaller, has more distinct grey/brown markings on its head and sides, and more colourful limbs than the western species.

== Taxonomy ==
A species that emerged in results during examination of a poorly studied taxonomic complex, known as the brachyotis species group of the macropod genus Petrogale. The description of the cryptic species was published in 2014 as part of a study of the phylogeny of the genus of rock-wallabies. The specific epithet commemorates the European explorer G. H. Wilkins, who had collected a specimen that was later assigned to the new species. Wilkins obtained his specimen in southeast Arnhem Land in 1925.

Two common names have been assigned to the species, Wilkins’ rock-wallaby and the eastern short-eared rock-wallaby.

== Description ==
A species of Petrogale, a diverse and widespread genus of macropods related to kangaroos and wallabies. They superficially resemble the species Petrogale brachyotis, but are darker in coloration, exhibit brighter fur at the limbs and display more distinct stripes at the head and flanks. The weight range is 2.6 to 3.5 kilograms (5.7 to 7.7 lb), smaller than the western species, and discovered to have deep divergence in their mitochondrial DNA that strongly supports the separation of their ancestral lineages. The overall colour of the pelage is dark brown and grey.

== Distribution and habitat ==
The distribution range of P. wilkinsi extends across the Top End of the Northern Territory.
