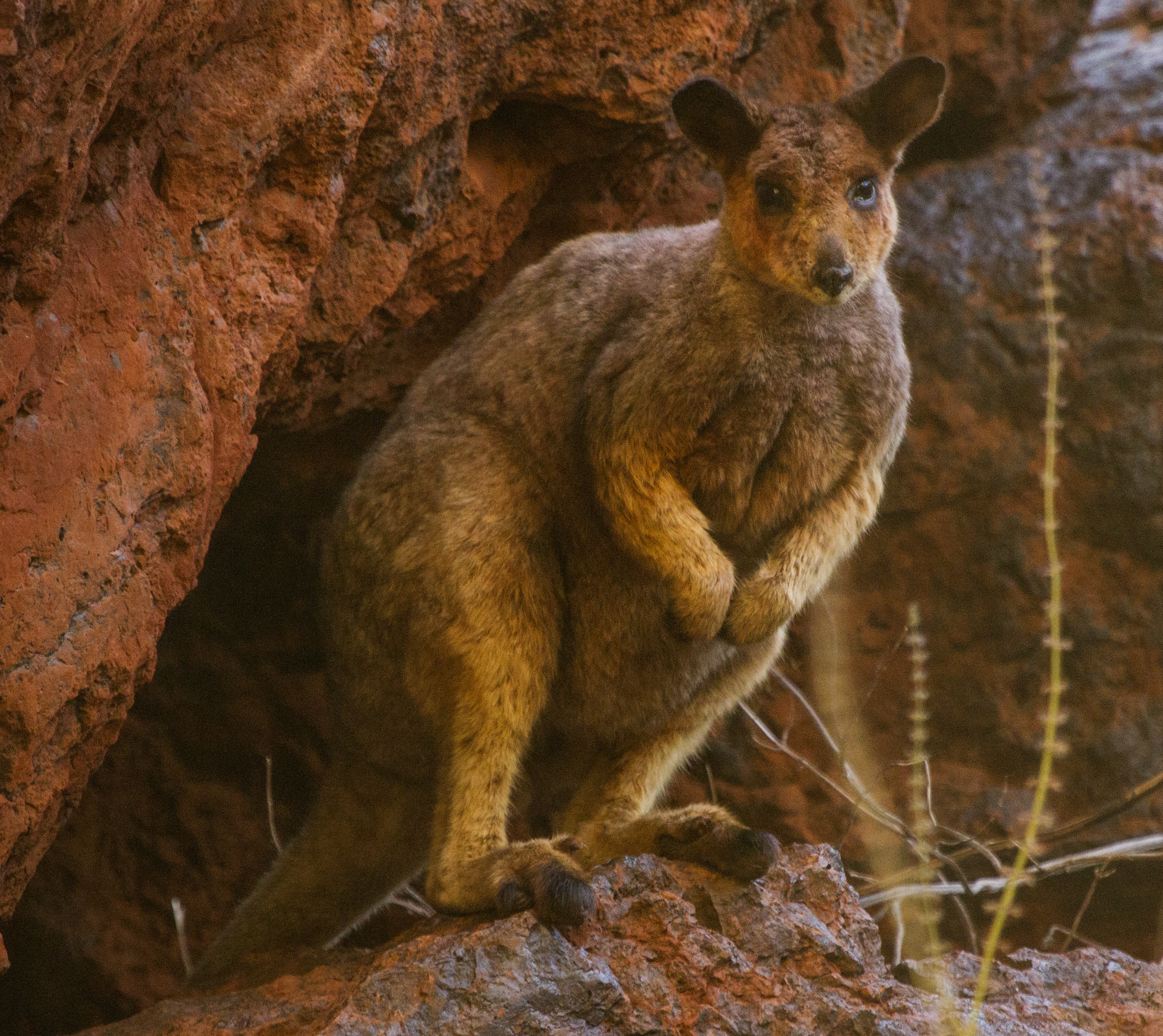

Conservation status
- Least Concern (IUCN 3.1)

Scientific classification
- Kingdom: Animalia
- Phylum: Chordata
- Class: Mammalia
- Infraclass: Marsupialia
- Order: Diprotodontia
- Family: Macropodidae
- Genus: Petrogale
- Species: P. rothschildi

Binomial name
- Petrogale rothschildi Thomas, 1904
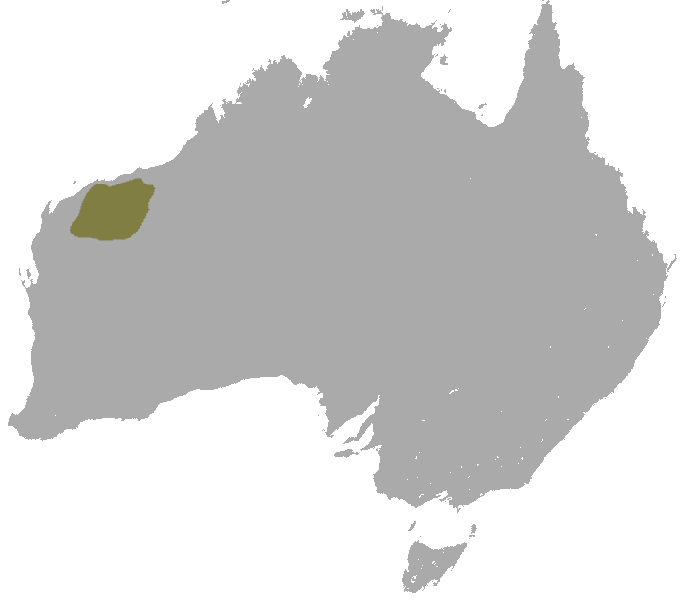
- Rothschild's rock-wallaby range

= Rothschild's rock-wallaby =

Species of marsupial

Rothschild's rock-wallaby (Petrogale rothschildi) – sometimes known as the Roebourne rock-wallaby, is a species of macropod found in Western Australia, in the Pilbara district and the Dampier Archipelago. It is not currently considered to be threatened, but is at risk from the red fox (Vulpes vulpes).

Rothschild's rock-wallaby is one of the largest rock-wallabies. It is predominantly golden-brown in colour with a greyish wash down its neck, which often has a purple appearance. It is mainly a nocturnal grass-eater usually found around rocky ground.

== Taxonomy ==
Petrogale rothschildi was first described by Oldfield Thomas in 1904, describing a skin provided by J. T. Tunney's collection from the Northwest of Australia. Tunney's specimen was a female's skin, without a skull, collected in July 1901 at Cossack River. Thomas saw an affinity with what was termed the Petrogale pencillatus-lateralis group, but distinguished enough characteristics to propose a new species of the rock wallabies. The author honoured a patron of Tunney's expeditions in the naming of the species, Walter Rothschild, whose special interest in Macropodidae was also noted.

== Description ==
Described as one of the most appealing species of Petrogale, the rock wallabies, it is also one of the largest of the genus. The fur colour at the upperside is a golden shade of brown, becoming greyish at the shoulders and rear of the neck. The top of the head and muzzle is dark brown, contrasting the paler grey-buff at the lower muzzle that extends below the eyes to the upper surface of the ear. The pelage sometimes has a purplish hue, most evident at the shoulder and head.

The head and body length combined is 470–600 millimetres, with a long tail recorded as 550–700 mm; the colour of the tail becomes dark brown for around a third of its length. The length of the ear from its point to the base is 56 mm. The weight range of Petrogale rothschildi is 3.7–6.6 kilograms. The population found at the islands of the Dampier Archipelago are smaller than those on the mainland, the weight range is from 2.6 to 3.5 kilograms.

== Behaviour and habitat ==
The species seeks shelter during the day in the cooler temperatures provided by the crevices and caves of its favoured habitat. They are highly secretive in their behaviour and use the rocky terrain to remain hidden or inaccessible to predators. Rothchild's rock-wallaby occurs at hummocks of vegetation covering scree slopes, around boulder piles and on cliff faces. They feed nocturnally beyond their daytime refuge, venturing out to seek green vegetation such as grasses on the surrounding sand plains. P. rothschildi requires access to water and foraging areas close to its refuge. The diet includes buffel grass, herbaceous plants and fruits of native Ficus species and prickly pear is consumed by the introduced population at West Lewis Island.

The range of diurnal refuge for the species is most frequently at caves, crevices or the collapse of cliffs, but it extends to include records of occupancy at features such as displaced rock piles and rail embankments created by the region's iron ore mining operations.

== Distribution and range ==
Found only in the Ashburton and Pilbara regions, they are known at Burrup Peninsula and both the Chichester Range and Hamersley Ranges. Petrogale rothschildi also occurs on islands of the Dampier Archipelago, these are Burrup, Dolphin, Enderby and Rosemary islands. As a result of sand mining operations on Enderby Island, a translocation of a group was successfully undertaken to the nearby West Lewis Island. The area occupied in historical periods is not known to have significantly contracted. The distribution range has been extended to the south and east on contemporary sighting information collected in 2013. The southernmost records are from Newman to the south-west at Barlee Range and Wanna Station. Any former overlap in range with Petrogale lateralis lateralis, at an easternmost boundary, has not been determined. They are recorded as far north as Marble Bar and to the west at Woodstock Station.

== Conservation ==
The species is not noted on state or federal Australian conservation listings. A Western Australian management plan published in 2013 included P. rothschildi amongst the five species of rock wallaby identified for recovery actions to protect them from threatening factors to the populations.

The introduction of the red fox Vulpes vulpes is assumed to have caused local extinctions, as reported at the East and West Intercourse islands, and declines in other localities. Fox control programs have improved the population trajectory where declines had been recorded. The shifting coastal terrain allows occasional access for red foxes to island refuges of P. rothschildi, causing periodic threats to these populations.

The species has been displaced by mining of iron ore in the region, and proposals for future ventures are expected to impact a larger area of its range. Translocation where these operations have removed their habitat have also been undertaken. The increased road traffic associated with the natural gas industry of northwest Australia has resulted in a greater number of these wallabies becoming road fatalities.
