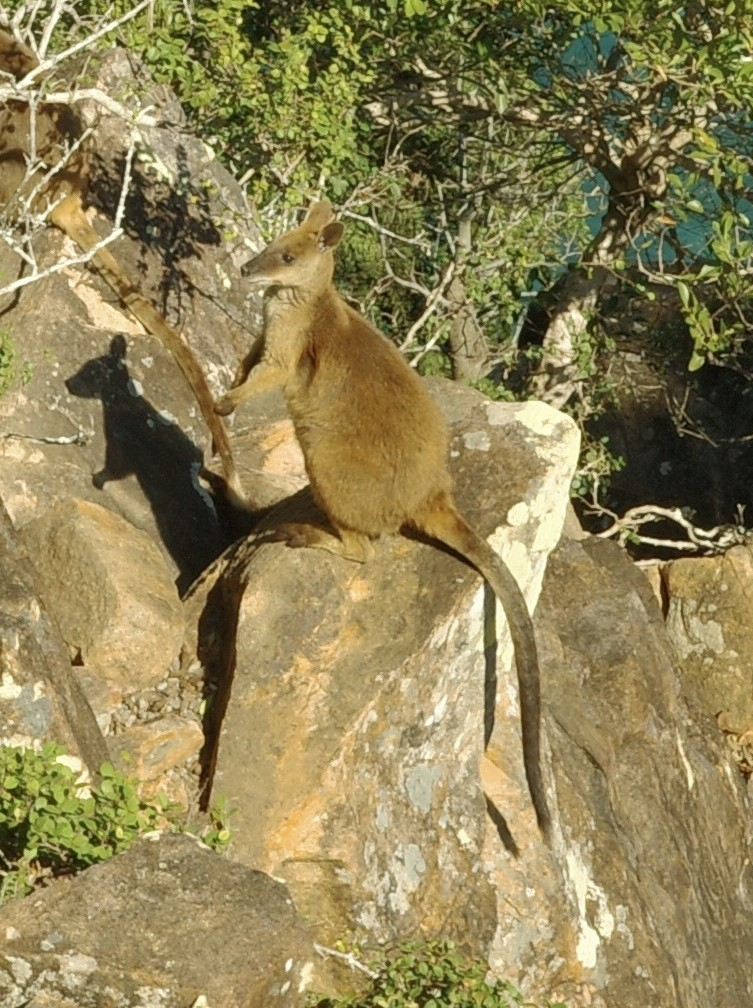

Conservation status
- Endangered (IUCN 3.1)

Scientific classification
- Kingdom: Animalia
- Phylum: Chordata
- Class: Mammalia
- Infraclass: Marsupialia
- Order: Diprotodontia
- Family: Macropodidae
- Genus: Petrogale
- Species: P. persephone

Binomial name
- Petrogale persephone Maynes, 1982
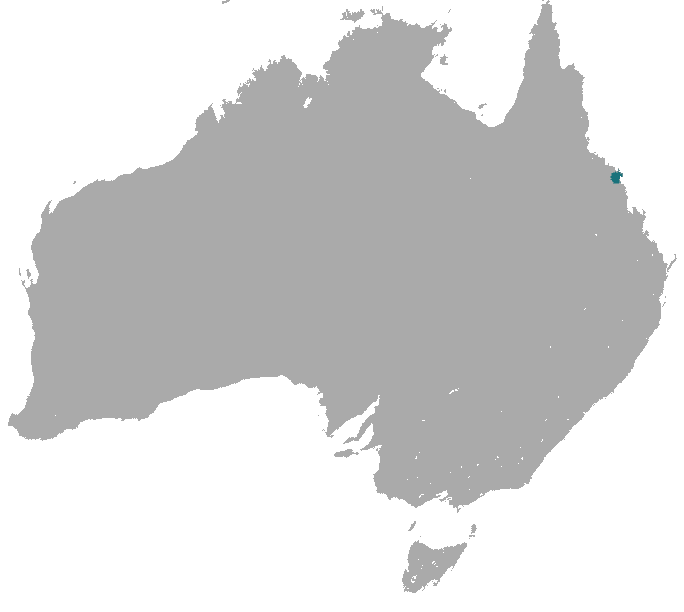
- Proserpine rock-wallaby range

= Proserpine rock-wallaby =

Species of marsupial

The Proserpine rock-wallaby (Petrogale persephone) is a species of rock-wallaby restricted to a small area in Conway National Park, Dryander National Park, Gloucester Island National Park, and around the town of Airlie Beach, all in the Whitsunday Region of Queensland, Australia.

The name is the Greek myth of Persephone (Proserpina in Latin), as well as from the location they were discovered. With its mythological background, the name symbolizes the fortuitous finding of the species at the beginning of spring and the restoration of knowledge of the species to mankind. In 1992 the species was listed as Endangered under the Endangered Species Protection Act, and in 1999, the Proserpine rock-wallaby was once again listed as 'Endangered' under the Commonwealth Environmental Protection and Biodiversity Conservation Act (EPBC), which became effective on June 16th, 2000. It was most recently assessed by the IUCN in 2015 with it listing as endangered under criteria B1ab(iii,v).

== Description ==
The Proserpine rock-wallaby is mostly grey in color and is a timid grass-eater that rarely ventures far from rock shelter. They are the second largest member of the genus Petrogale, with males ranging from 4.3–10.2 kg (9.5–22.5 lb) and females at 3.5–8 kg (7.7–17.6 lb). It is distinguished from the many other rock wallabies found in northeastern Queensland by its larger size and longer tail, tipped with white, distinct lack of pelage markings, incomplete ectoympanic ring not fused to posterior end of zygomatic arch, large pre-molars, and preference for deciduous vine forest habitats. It was unknown to science until 1977, when a single individual was captured after farmers at Proserpine had spoken of a strange form of rock wallaby in the area. It was scientifically described in 1982 by Maynes GM who placed it as one of 11 species of rock-wallaby currently recognized in Queensland.

== Habitat ==
The Proserpine rock-wallaby requires rocky outcrops, rock piles, and cliffs within a sloping microphyll/notophyll semi-deciduous dry vine forest in order to survive as these locations provide the best access to food and the ability to evade predators. Large rock piles act as a refuge site not only for protection from predators, but also aid in reducing the effects of high temperatures and humidity during summer months. During dry periods, colonies will move to the edges of the vine forest to feed on grasses. The Proserpine rock-wallaby is found only in a relatively intensively-settled area, but it is in competition with other more successful rock-wallaby species, which competition is probably responsible for its threatened status.

== Lifecycle ==
The Proserpine rock-wallaby will breed approximately once per year producing a single offspring and has an oestrus cycle range of 33–35 days with a gestation period of 33–34 days. Within hours of giving birth, postpartum mating's will generally occur with the female exhibiting embryonic diapause.

The young wallabies are born underdeveloped and will spend an average of 203 to 215 days in their mothers' pouch, with the mother lactating until the offspring are fully weaned around 105 to 139 days after they leave the pouch. During the mothers weaning of the young, prolactin decreases causing the activation of embryonic development in the next young. Male Proserpine rock-wallabies become sexually mature at 24.8 to 25.2 months, while females become sexually mature at 20.5 to 25.1 months. They tend to have an average lifespan of 7–10 years in the wild.

Hybridization is common with the genus Petrogale, with the first being discovered in 1976 and are still occasionally recorded today. While fertility in these hybridized wallabies is diminished, both male and female hybrids are still fertile.

== Behavior ==
The Proserpine rock-wallaby tend to be crepuscular, spending the day resting in their rocky shelters. When foraging, the animals are extremely cautious and will remain near their rocky shelters in case of encounters with predators.

They are social creatures and tend to share shelters with 4 to 8 other individuals, but as many as 35 individuals have been observed cohabitating within one rock pile. If rock shelters are connected, individuals will move between colonies. The animals have also been observed to occasionally graze in groups of 2 to 6 individuals.

=== Diet ===
The Proserpine rock-wallaby is herbivorous and feeds mainly on dropped leaves, supplemented by grasses, vines, ferns, and fungus. In dry spells, they will forage in nearby grassy areas with riparian vegetation and beach scrub providing critical foraging resources during drought. They will also graze on lawns and a number of common garden plants such as balsam and hibiscus flowers.

== Predators ==
The Proserpine rock-wallaby have a few native predators including dingos, carpet pythons, and goannas. As more introductions of the species in new locations have occurred, they are faced with new predators. When introduced to the Hayman Island many Proserpine rock-wallabies were found dead with wounds most commonly associated with eagle attacks. The suspected predators were narrowed down to the wedge-tailed eagle and the white breasted sea eagle.

== Threats ==
The Proserpine rock-wallaby is threatened by multiple factors. Its habitat has declined from increased urbanization and tourism, leading it vulnerable to road kill and predation from domestic dogs and cats. A potential long-term threat to the Proserpine rock-wallaby is anthropogenic climate change, as crossover boundaries of various Petrogale species could be affected by climate change. This crossover is leading to inbreeding and hybridization between the Prosperine and Unadorned rock-wallaby species. This potential inbreeding and hybridization is a cause for concern as there is the potential the subsequent offspring will be infertile. Sterile offspring could lead to a diminished breeding pool and place further pressure on the species which already has relatively low genetic variation.

Its feeding habits make it vulnerable to consuming introduced toxic plants like the pink periwinkle, which can be found in many household gardens. The rock-wallabies may not be able to differentiate between its native foraging plants or ones introduced to its habitat leading to the higher risk of it ingesting a toxic plant commonly found as garden ornamentals. The introduction of diseases such as Toxoplasmosis and Hydatids from dogs and domestic or feral cats have also posed major threats to the species. Toxoplasmosis has been documented to cause blindness and death in rock-wallabies, while hydatids have been attributed to the death of a small sample size of deceased Proserpine rock-wallabies, both are believed to be becoming an increasing threat.

== Conservation ==
Current conservation strategies for this species involve the acquisition of protected habitat, adding wildlife reflectors to roadkill zones to prevent further fatalities, and controlling toxic plants near their habitat.

Conservationists first objective is to monitor known Proserpine rock-wallaby populations to determine the absence, presence, and colony conditions of the known 24 existing PRW sites. To do this heavy identification, mapping, and monitoring will occur in order to prioritize weed control, fencing, removal of cattle, and protection from intense fires in order to secure these critical sites. Time will also be spent promoting the conservation and management of the Proserpine rock-wallaby's habitat off park estate through voluntary conservation agreements, council open space habitat areas, and management of covenant areas. For much of this planning to work habitat fragmentation either in or between the species habitat needs to be avoided or minimized as there is currently no protection over areas that join two Proserpine habitats leading them to be cut off from one another.

Conservationists second objective is to maintain and monitor the population of Proserpine rock-wallabies on Hayman Island. Introductions of captive bred wallabies were released to the island to establish populations that are less likely to be threatened by disease, parasites, road strikes, introduced predators, and toxic plants. In 1998, 26 individuals were released on the island and have since doubled in size. Between 2006 and 2008, 5 more individuals were introduced to strengthen genetic viability among the colony. Conservationists hope this new island population will provide a source for future introductions or translocation of existing colonies that have suffered catastrophic losses. Further monitoring of the island will occur with the hope that a plan will be developed to provide future guidance if the Hayman Island reaches its carrying capacity and if any of the excess animals could potentially be introduced back to the mainland.

Conservationists are taking steps to minimize disease, incidental kills, and other threatening processes on the wallaby's population. To reduce road mortality, they proposal 1.5-meter diameter drainage pipes to be built beneath newly constructed roads, allowing the populations to safely move between habitats. This is coupled with the monitoring of turfed areas established in old quarries to reduce the number of individuals crossing roads. Measures being taken to reduce the spread of disease as well as predation from domestic pets is the promotion of fencing in or adjacent to the species habitat as well as the reduction in feral cat reduction. Additionally, public education campaigns regarding incidence and effects of hydatids in the species population are also expected to be implemented to help bring awareness to the various threats to the species.
