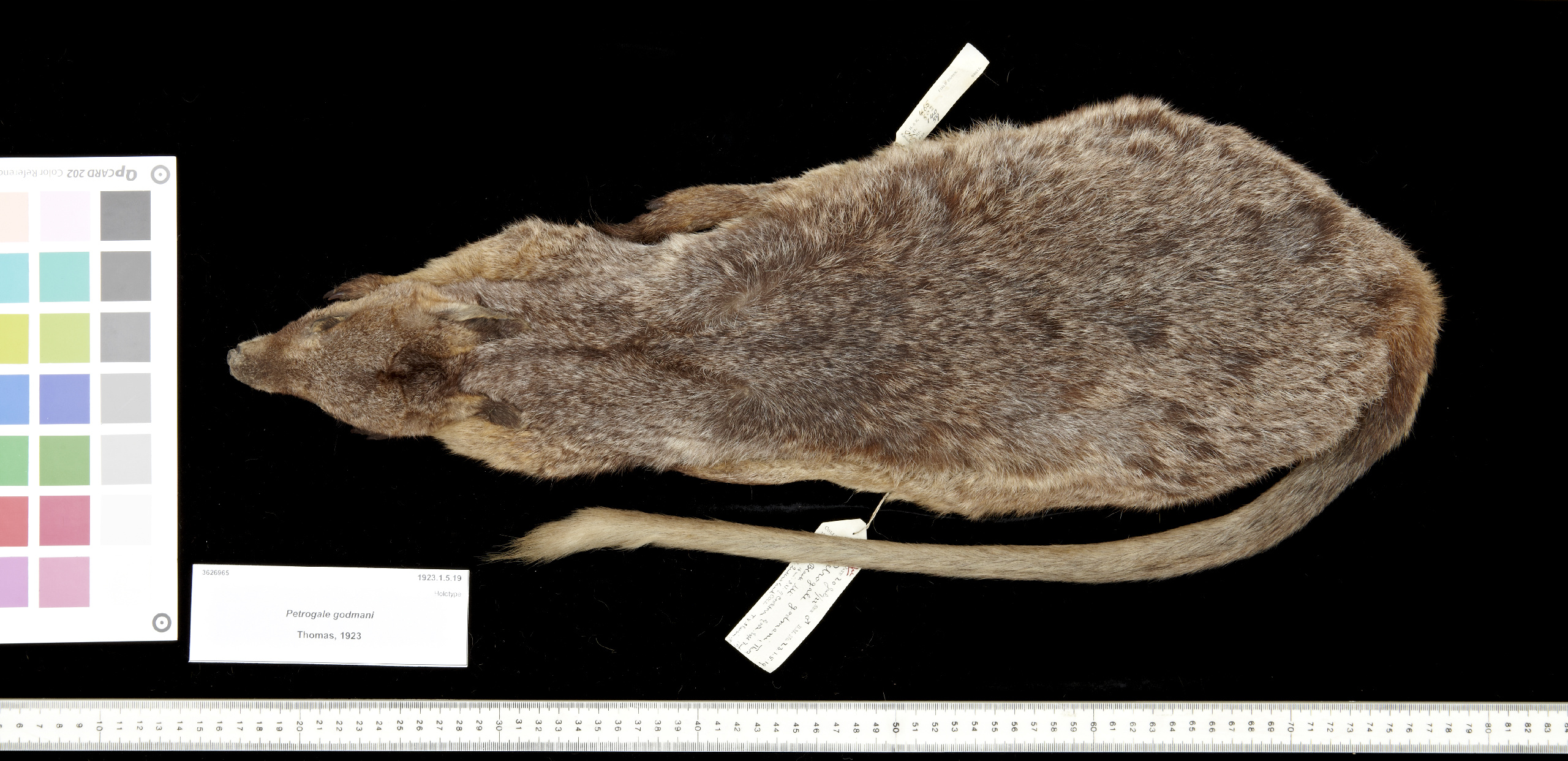

Conservation status
- Near Threatened (IUCN 3.1)

Scientific classification
- Kingdom: Animalia
- Phylum: Chordata
- Class: Mammalia
- Infraclass: Marsupialia
- Order: Diprotodontia
- Family: Macropodidae
- Genus: Petrogale
- Species: P. godmani

Binomial name
- Petrogale godmani Thomas, 1923
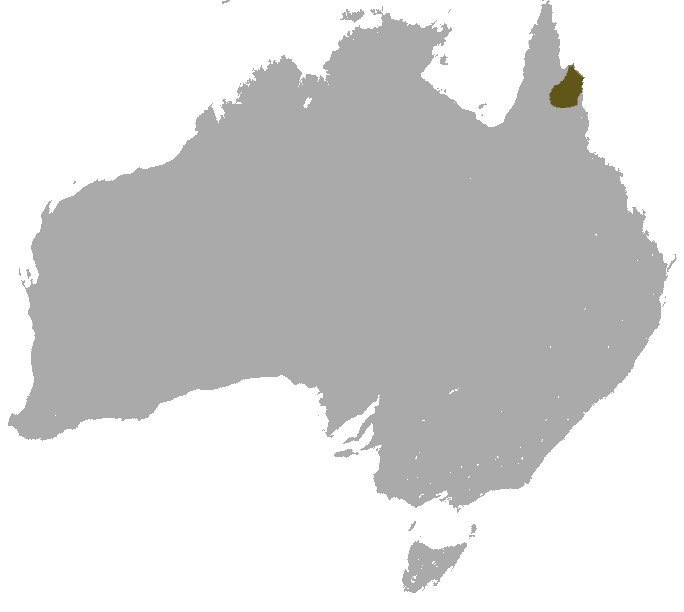
- Godman's rock-wallaby range

= Godman's rock-wallaby =

Species of marsupial

Godman's rock-wallaby (Petrogale godmani) is a diprotodont marsupial, and a typical rock-wallaby. It is found in northern and north-eastern Queensland, Australia. This rock-wallaby is found in low open forest, open scrub, or montane regions, often near the coast. It shelters in rocky terrain adjacent to feeding areas. Godman's rock-wallaby is a nocturnal gregarious territorial folivore.
