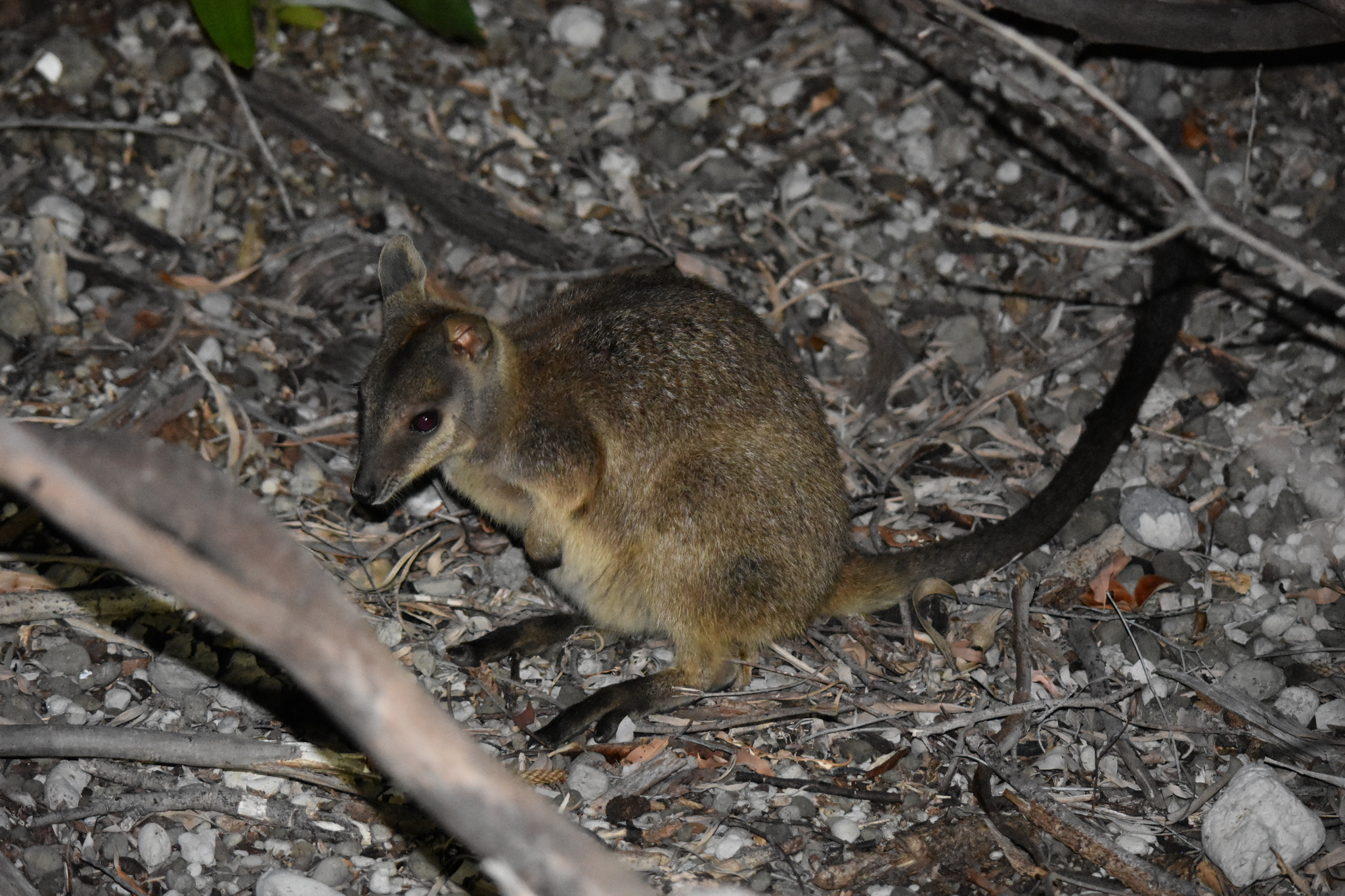

Conservation status
- Least Concern (IUCN 3.1)

Scientific classification
- Kingdom: Animalia
- Phylum: Chordata
- Class: Mammalia
- Infraclass: Marsupialia
- Order: Diprotodontia
- Family: Macropodidae
- Genus: Petrogale
- Species: P. inornata

Binomial name
- Petrogale inornata Gould, 1842
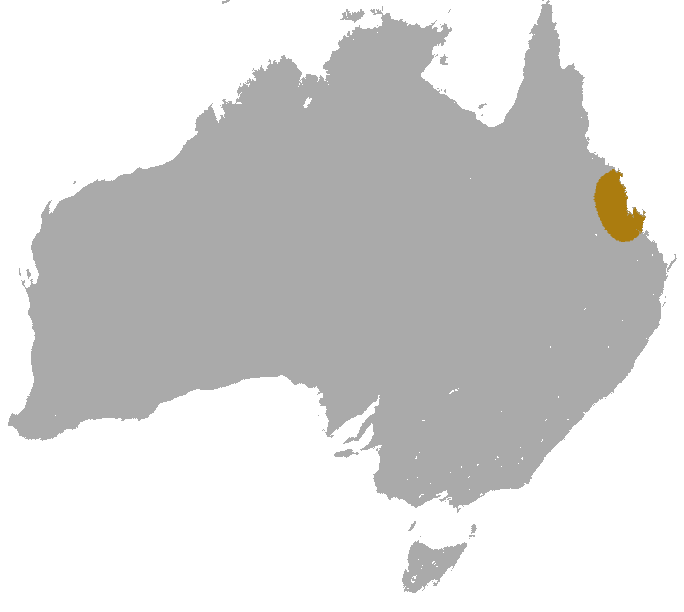
- Unadorned rock-wallaby range

= Unadorned rock-wallaby =

Species of marsupial

The unadorned rock-wallaby (Petrogale inornata) is a member of a group of closely related rock-wallabies found in northeastern Queensland, Australia. It is paler than most of its relatives and even plainer, hence its common name.

The unadorned rock-wallaby is patchily distributed in coastal ranges from around Rockhampton to near Townsville. This range includes the small range of the Proserpine rock-wallaby (P. persephone), the only rock-wallaby in the region not closely related to its neighbours. Interbreeding threatens the latter species.
