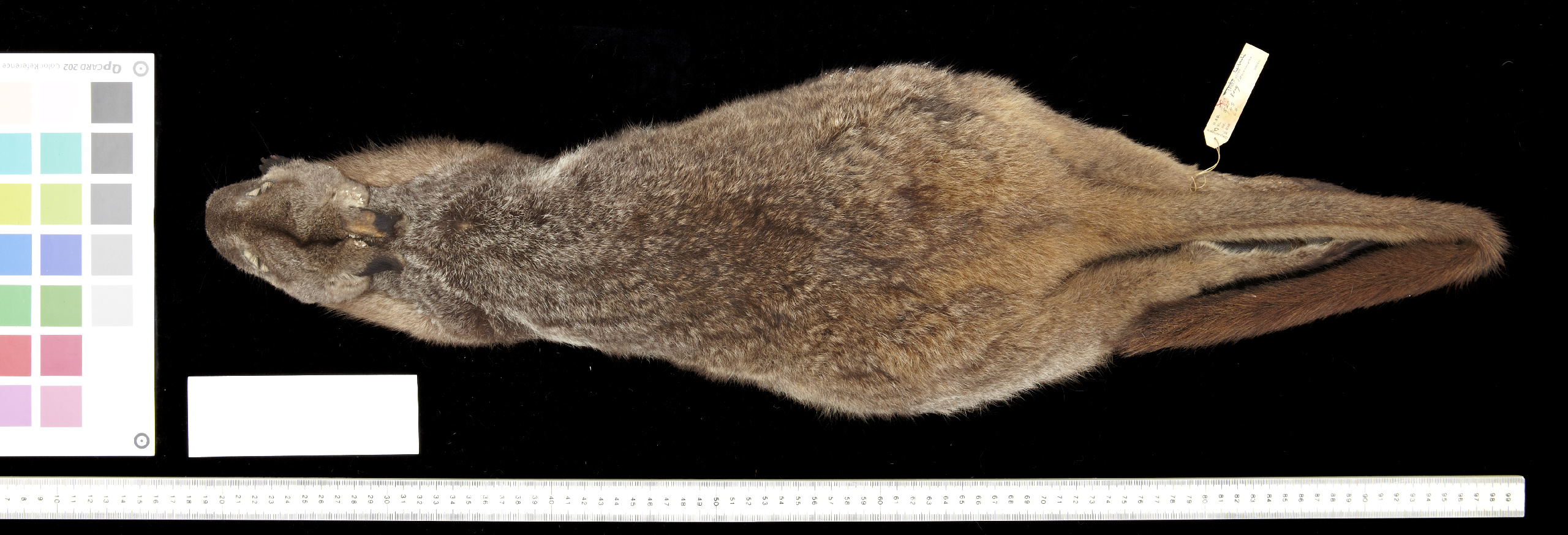

Conservation status
- Least Concern (IUCN 3.1)

Scientific classification
- Kingdom: Animalia
- Phylum: Chordata
- Class: Mammalia
- Infraclass: Marsupialia
- Order: Diprotodontia
- Family: Macropodidae
- Genus: Petrogale
- Species: P. herberti

Binomial name
- Petrogale herberti Thomas, 1926
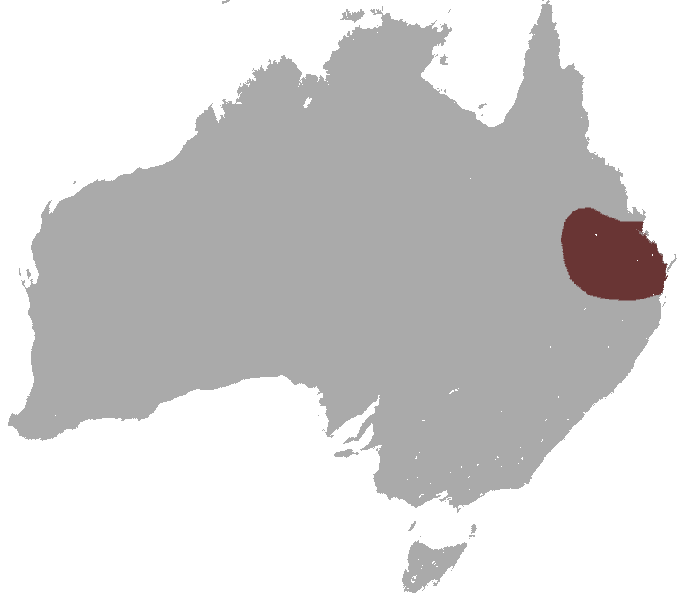
- Herbert's rock-wallaby range

= Herbert's rock-wallaby =

Species of marsupial

Herbert's rock-wallaby (Petrogale herberti) is a member of a group of seven very closely related rock-wallabies found in northeastern Queensland, Australia. Herbert's is the most southerly and most widespread of the group.

Herbert's rock-wallaby is distributed from around 100 km northwest of Brisbane north to the Fitzroy River. It ranges inland to around Clermont and Rubyvale. It is the largest of the related group of Queensland rock-wallabies.

The species was named in honour of the mineralogist Herbert Smith.
