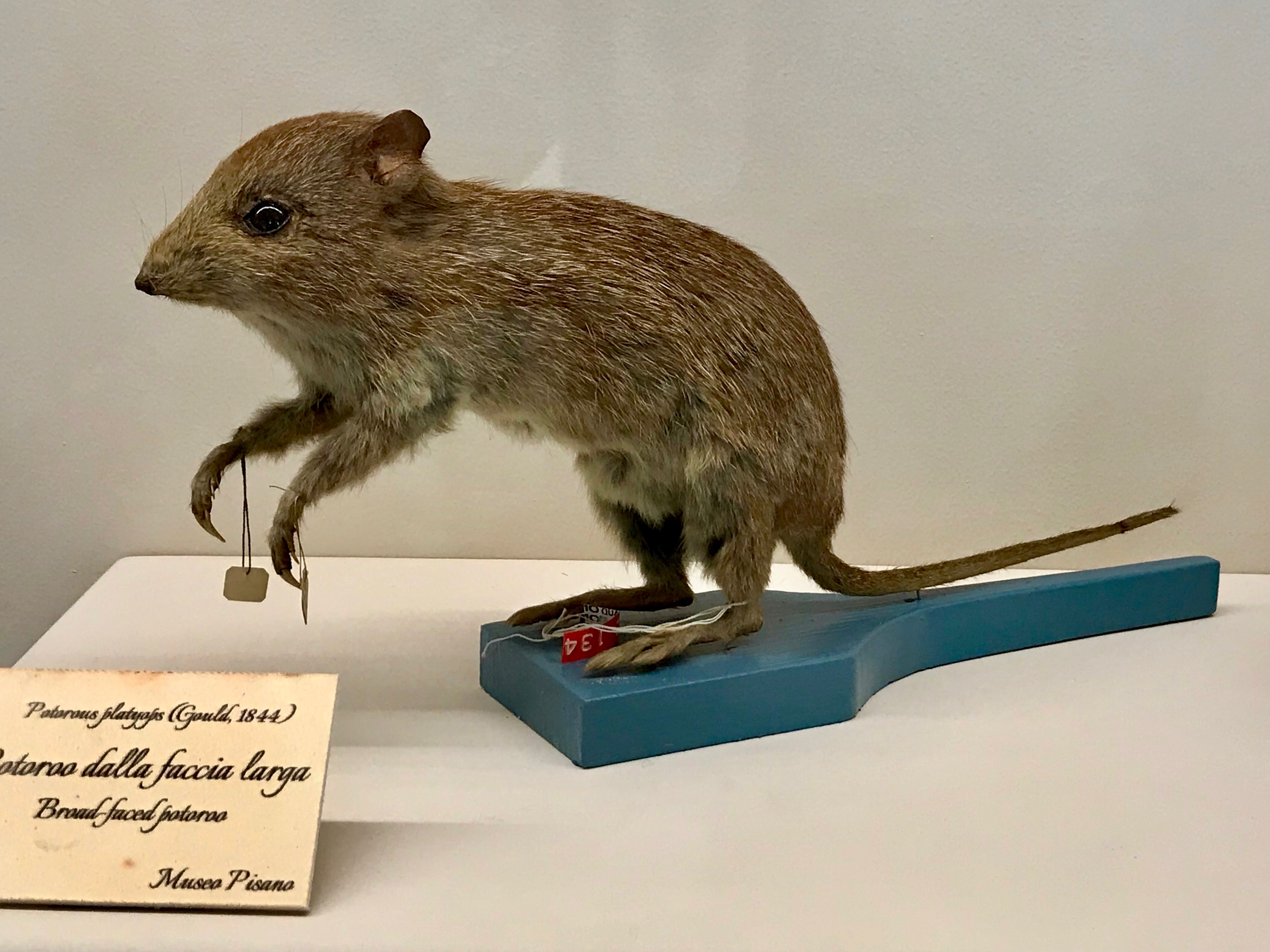
- Stuffed specimen at the Natural History Museum Pisa

Conservation status
- Extinct (c. 1875) (IUCN 3.1)

Scientific classification
- Kingdom: Animalia
- Phylum: Chordata
- Class: Mammalia
- Infraclass: Marsupialia
- Order: Diprotodontia
- Family: Potoroidae
- Genus: Potorous
- Species: †P. platyops

Binomial name
- †Potorous platyops (Gould, 1844)
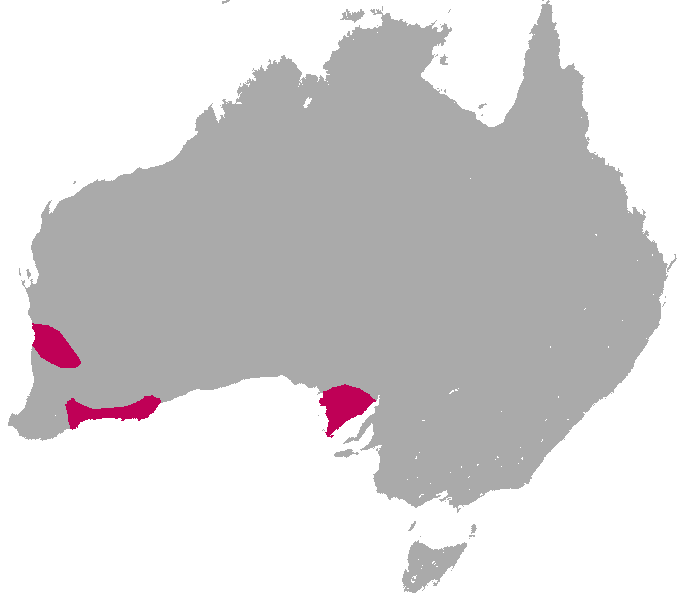

= Broad-faced potoroo =

Extinct species of marsupial

The broad-faced potoroo (Potorous platyops) is an extinct potoroid marsupial that was found in southwestern Australia. The first specimen was collected in 1839, and described by John Gould in 1844. Only a small number of specimens have been collected since. The last live capture was in 1875. Subfossil remains indicate that it had an extensive distribution around the semiarid coastal districts of Southwest Australia.

The habitat of the broad-faced potoroo is almost entirely unknown, but unlike its relatives, such as the long-nosed potoroo Potorous tridactylus and long-footed Potorous longipes, they do not seem to have lived in dense understories in forests. Preserved specimens indicate that it was smaller than other potoroos at around 300 mm (1 ft) long with a 180-mm tail. Their weight is estimated at 800 g. Their coat was grizzled with yellowish hairs above and greyish white below. Their body was similar in shape to that of other potoroids. Their ears were small and rounded, muzzle fairly short, and cheeks notably puffy.

== Taxonomy ==
The first description was published by John Gould, using a specimen obtained by his collector John Gilbert at "Walyema Swamps near Northam, Western Australia". Gilbert visited this inland region while collecting around the recently established Swan River Colony. The site he referred to was determined to be Lake Walyormouring.

The single specimen forwarded to Gould was presented to the Linnean Society of London, and the partial skull and skin of a female was deposited in the British Museum of Natural History. There were few collected after Gould's initial description. There was one animal collected by James Drummond and recorded in a letter in the 1840s, the collector George Masters prepared four specimens in the 1860s, presumably when he made a large collection of taxa at Mordup. The last collection of living Potorous platyops was in 1874, collected by William Webb and are now held at the Macleay Museum in Sydney.

Curator and collector Hedley H. Finlayson described the remains of a potoroine animal found in a South Australian cave, which were similar to the Potorous platyops. However, the bones were retrieved from a site far from where the Potorous platyops was thought to be found, as well as the teeth being different from previously collections specimens. He ended up naming it as a new species, Potorous morgani. The specimen was later identified as a Potorous platyops. The skull that was studied and was held at a South Australian museum, amongst a deposit of multiple taxa from Kelly's Hill Caves, which was collected by A.M. Morgan. The specific epithet morgani refers to the collector. Finlayson's 1934 description recognised a close similarity to this species. When he obtained more specimens, which were collected at the same cave system on Kangaroo Island by Edith May, he obtained a second partial skull. Comparison of the dentition and other morphological characteristics was limited to works published by G. R. Waterhouse (1846), Oldfield Thomas (1888) and B. Arthur Bensley (1903) whose descriptions of P. platyops are recorded at the BMNH.

Common names include broad-faced potoroo and a name from the Nyungar language, moda, which was recorded by Gilbert and noted in Gould's 1844 description as mor-da, and mort or moort by other ecologists writing shortly after its extinction. The name was obtained through an interview with Nyungar peoples at King George Sound by Gilbert. Early records show that it was also named the broad-faced rat kangaroo.

== Description ==
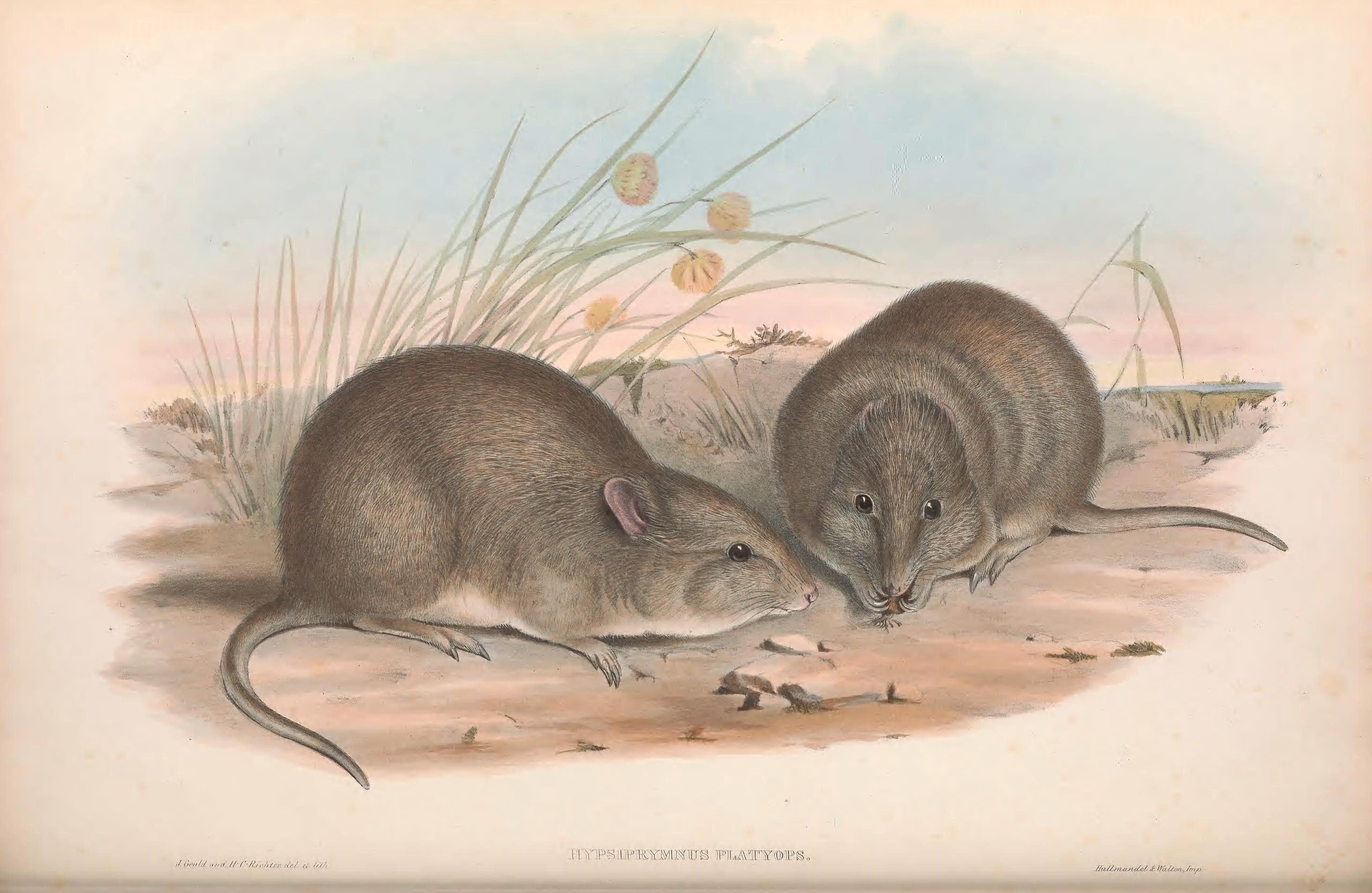
Illustration by H. C. Richter in Gould's Mammals of Australia (1863)

The broad-faced potoroo is a member of the genus Potorous. It is described as having a relatively broad skull and shorter muzzle. The species is presumed to have become extinct sometime after the last recorded capture of the animal in 1875, and sometime before 1905.

The colour of the pelage is greyish brown at the upper-side. Straw-yellow hairs are interspersed through the fur to give a streaked effect. The underside and the flanks are pale grey. The head and body are about 305 millimetres in length, while the tail is about 178 mm long. Their hind feet are about 54 mm in length and their weight is approximately 800 grams. Their noses are short and blunt, which is an unusual characteristic among potorines and is usually associated with species such as the rufous bettong (Aepyprymnus rufescens) and the desert rat-kangaroo (Caloprymnus campestris).

== Ecology ==
The behaviour of the species has not been recorded, and nothing is known of its diet. The scant record of its habitat includes those provided by John Gilbert's informants, one of whom said, "All I could glean of its habits was that it was killed in a thicket surrounding one of the salt lagoons in the interior".

An assessment of documents prior to the 20th century concluded the only ecological change to affect the population were anecdotal reports of a "disease", similar to one that had resulted in the sudden absence of similar species. A synthesis combining other historical evidence proposes what may have been an epizootic during the 1890s that precipitated their extinction. No historical evidence could be found to link the conclusion of South African collector Guy C. Shortridge, writing in 1910, that ecological changes such as bushfire and the introduction of cats were directly linked to the species' decline.

Guy Shortridge searched extensively for this species on his collecting expedition near Bremer Bay, finding Potorous gilbertii skulls at caves near Margaret River, but could only provide the historical details of this species provided to him in his 1910 report. The information he reported—assumed to be from Nyungar informants—was that the species became extinct in 1905, were similar to the quokka in range and habits, and had been commonly found and often captured in large quantities. The remains were examined the following year, along with the remains of a dibbler, which was found along with the P. gilbertii remains in a deposit beneath a moving dune system. Another set of bones was found in a midden beneath a large peppermint (Agonis flexuosa), which was assumed to be the feeding roost of a predatory bird such as an owl. This site, near Hunter River, was partly preserved by a sand dune and included species introduced after the colonisation of Australia, possibly placing the date of these remains within recent history. Sub-fossil remains identified as P. platyops were also found in a survey of deposits on the Eyre Peninsula, accumulations that may have been middens of pre-colonial peoples of the region.

== Distribution ==
The few records of live specimens are restricted to Southwest Australia. The species could have already been near-extinct when Gilbert obtained his specimen, and no specific localities are known with any certainty. Sub-fossil remains indicate a wide distribution range, extending from the southern to the western regions of Australia, including Nullarbor Plain, and perhaps as far north as the Northwest Cape region. Remains have also been found on Kangaroo Island.

Some evidence indicates that P. platyops, like the desert-dwelling rat-kangaroo (Caloprymnus campestris), was already in decline when the invasive European rabbit became established in the species' former range.

== Sources ==
- Claridge, A. W.; Seebeck, J. H.; Rose, R. (2007). Bettongs, potoroos, and the musky rat-kangaroo. Collingwood, Victoria: CSIRO Pub. ISBN 978-0-643-09341-6.
