= Milliyowi =

Milliyowi Temporal range: Early Pliocene, 4.46–4.47 Ma

Scientific classification
- Kingdom: Animalia
- Phylum: Chordata
- Class: Mammalia
- Infraclass: Marsupialia
- Order: Diprotodontia
- Family: Potoroidae
- Genus: †Milliyowi; Flannery et al., 1992
- Species: †M. bunganditj

Binomial name
- †Milliyowi bunganditj Flannery et al., 1992

Extinct genus of marsupials

Milliyowi is an extinct genus of potoroid marsupial that inhabited Australia during the Early Pliocene. The genus contains a single species, Milliyowi bunganditj, known from numerous isolated and associated teeth found near Hamilton in south-western Victoria. It is thought to be closely related to the rufous rat-kangaroo (Aepyprymnus rufescens). It likely lived in forest environments.

== Discovery and naming ==
The holotype specimen of Milliyowi, NMV P158635, comes from Early Pliocene sediments located near the town of Hamilton in southwestern Victoria. The specimen consists of a partial upper premolar and two upper molars preserved in a single lump of matrix. Moreover, six additional specimens from the type locality have been referred to this taxon. These include PM 50763 (an upper molar), NMV P158068 (an upper molar), PM 16821 (crown of a lower incisor), NMV P53223 (fragment of a lower premolar), NMV P158069 (a lower molar) and NMV P54137 (a lower molar).

In 1992, Tim Flannery and colleagues described Milliyowi bunganditj as a new genus and species of potoroid based on these fossil remains. The generic epithet is a combination of the Aboriginal words "millia", meaning "rat-kangaroo", and "yowi", which means "spirit surviving the death of the body". The authors did not specify as to what Aboriginal language the words comes from. The specific epithet is after the Bungandidj people, who used to live in the Hamilton area.

== Description ==
The upper premolar of Milliyowi is incomplete, with only two-thirds of the tooth preserved. At least seven ridges, called transcristae, are present on the lingual and buccal sides of the premolar. However, when complete, it could of had as many as ten on each side. In comparison, potoroos and the desert rat-kangaroo have four to five on each side, while the rufous rat-kangaroo has seven or eight. The transcristae form into cusps where they meet on the straight occlusal (biting) blade, except for the back portion of the tooth facing the lingual side. This trait might be variable, as seen in some potoroids. The first two upper molars have sloping lingual edges, but are more steeply sloped in the remaining molars. The first upper molar has a weakly-developed protoloph, which is shorter than the well-developed metaloph. A deep fissure prevents the postparacrista from linking with the postmetacrista. Both the second and third upper molars have a more developed protoloph that is subequal in length to the metaloph. The fourth upper molar, however, has a metaloph much shorter than the protoloph. In addition, it also has sharper and less bulbous ridges and lophs.

The lower incisor is extremely elongate and narrow. It possesses an enamel crest that extends the length of the crown, as seen in some macropodids. Much like the upper premolar, the lower premolar is incomplete, with only three-fourths of it being preserved. Six cuspslets and associated transcristids are present on the fragment, although the remnant of a seventh transcristid is visible on the buccal side. Some of the transcristids form into small subsidiary branches as they approach the occlusal blade, which then disappear into intervening valleys. The buccal edges of the first lower molar are sloped at a gentle angle. In contrast, the buccal edge of the third or fourth lower molar slopes at a more steeper angle. The hypolophid is poorly developed and the protolophid, like in other potoroines, forms a single cusp on the first lower molar. The lingual side of the interlophid valley on the third or fourth lower molar has ornamentation.

== Classification ==
In 1989, Flannery included Milliyowi in his analysis of the phylogeny of Macropodoidea under the informal name "Hamilton potoroid". He found it difficult to place due to the fragmentary nature of its remains, but noted that it probably lies outside of the clade containing Caloprymnus and Aepyprymnus as it lacks a hypertrophied posthypocristid on its lower molars. Several years later, Flannery and colleagues tentatively referred it to the tribe Bettongini and regarded it as incertae sedis within the group. In his description of Borungaboodie, Gavin Prideaux allied it with Aepyprymnus on the basis of its high-crowned, sublophodont molars and trigonids that are elongated from front-to-back.

Below is a dendrogram from Prideaux (1999) showing his hypothesis of potoroine relationships:

- Potoroinae
  - Potoroini
    Potorous
  - Bettongini
    - Wakiewakie
    - - Bettongia
      - - Borungaboodie
        - - Caloprymnus
          - - Milliyowi
            - Aepyprymnus

== Paleobiology ==
Milliyowi is known from the Hamilton Local Fauna, which itself is derived from an unnamed lithic unit located approximately 7 km (4.3 mi) west of Hamilton, Victoria. The unit overlies the off-shore marine Grange Burn Formation, and underlies a basalt flow. Based on the presence of certain taxa, the environment is interpreted as predominately rainforest, with patches of other wet forests and open grassy areas. Charred tree stumps of Phyllocladus have been found directly under the layer of basalt. Fossil pollen belonging to Podocarpus, Dacrydium, Phyllocladus, Casuarina, Nothofagus, Myrtaceae, and Poaceae have also been recovered. The age of the Hamilton Local Fauna is constrained between 4.46 ± 0.01 and 4.47 million years.

The Hamilton Local Fauna preserves a diverse assemblage of mammals. Other macropods present include the propleopine Propleopus, the hypisprymnodontine Hypsiprymnodon, the lagostrophine Troposodon, the sthenurine Simosthenurus, and the macropodines Dorcopsis wintercookorum, cf. Dendrolagus, Thylogale ignis, Kurrabi pelchenorum, Protemnodon, Notamacropus and cf. Wallabia. Possums are represented by the burramyid Burramys triradiatus, the ektopodontid Darcius duggani, the phalangerids Trichosurus hamiltonensis and Onirocuscus notialis, the petaurids Petaurus cf. norfolcensis and Petaurus cf. australis, and the pseudocheirids Pseudokoala erlita, Tous stirtoni and Petauroides marshalli. The presence of the dasyurid Antechinus and the palorchestid Palorchestes pickeringi is also notable.
