= Borungaboodie =

Borungaboodie Temporal range: Late Pleistocene, 0.119–0.089 Ma

Scientific classification
- Kingdom: Animalia
- Phylum: Chordata
- Class: Mammalia
- Infraclass: Marsupialia
- Order: Diprotodontia
- Family: Potoroidae
- Genus: †Borungaboodie; Prideaux, 1999
- Species: †B. hatcheri

Binomial name
- †Borungaboodie hatcheri Prideaux, 1999

Extinct genus of marsupial

Borungaboodie is an extinct genus of small macropod marsupial that inhabited southwestern Australia during the Pleistocene epoch. The genus is represented by a single species known as Borungaboodie hatcheri, or more informally, the giant potoroo. It is known from a lower jaw bone discovered in Tight Entrance Cave during a 1996 expedition, and was later named and described in 1999. Although smaller than most macropods, it is the largest known potoroine. It is closely related to the recently extinct desert rat-kangaroo and still-living rufous rat-kangaroo.

== Discovery and naming ==
The first fossils of Borungaboodie were discovered in 1996 at Tight Entrance Cave, near Witchcliffe in southwest Western Australia by Lindsay Hatcher and his team at the Western Australian Speleological Group (WASG). This happened after it was discovered that the cave contains fossils of extinct species several years earlier. The holotype specimen, WAM 97.5.1, is a partial right dentary and belonged to an adult individual.

In 1999, Gavin Prideaux described Borungaboodie hatcheri as a new genus and species of potoroo based on these fossil remains. The generic epithet is derived from the Nyoongar borunga, meaning "very big", and boodie, the word for the burrowing bettong. The name was chosen to emphasise the robust and large nature of the holotype relative to all other potoroines. The specific epithet honours its discoverer, Lindsay Hatcher.

== Description ==
Borungaboodie hatcheri is the largest known species of potoroine, with an estimated body weight of approximately 10 kg (22 lbs). Its dentary alone measured 30% larger than the next largest potoroine, the rufous rat-kangaroo.

In its description, Prideaux established some distinctive traits for Borungaboodie. The mandibular ramus is proportionally deeper along its entire length compared to other potoroines, which results in a straighter ventral margin. Two small holes known as mental foramina are present on the buccal surface of the ramus, a trait also seen in Wakiewakie and some specimens of the burrowing bettong. The front and bottom border of the masseteric fossa, the depression on the mandible to which the masseter attaches, has a prominent attachment scar. A short diastema is present between the first incisor and third premolar. The incisor is robust and has an upturned appearance. The premolar is longer relative to the first molar and bears seven vertical ridgelets (transcristids) on each side. The protolophid crest on the first molar is significantly narrower than the hypolophid. However, on the fourth molar, the hypolophid is not as narrow relative to the protolophid. The trigonid is short from front-to-back and lacks a notch between the lingual (closest to the tongue) extremity of the paracristid and the front face of the metaconid.

== Classification ==
In its description, Borungaboodie was placed in the tribe Bettongini on the basis of several characters, including fine vertical ridgelets on the lower premolar and lack of a well-developed ventral enamel flange on the lower incisor. It is the plesiomorphic sister taxon to the desert rat-kangaroo, rufous rat-kangaroo and Milliyowi. The following dendrogram shows the evolutionary relationships of Borungaboodie as in Prideaux (1999).

- Potoroinae
  - Potoroini
    Potorous
  - Bettongini
    - Wakiewakie
    - - Bettongia
      - - Borungaboodie
        - - Caloprymnus
          - - Milliyowi
            - Aepyprymnus

== Paleobiology ==
Borungaboodie specialized in eating nuts or stony fruits and was probably opportunistic, scavenging carrion or hunting small vertebrates. The molars are bunodont (bumpy and rounded cusped), making them capable of crushing and, to a lesser degree, grinding. Its blade-like premolar would have functioned in a very similar manner to that of modern bettongs. However, it may have had a more resistant diet as the anterior end of the premolar is much deeper. The mandible is robust and deep, with a possibly vertical ascending ramus. This, coupled with having a larger area of attachment for the masseter muscle, would have resulted in a larger bite force.

== Paleoecology ==
Borungaboodie is known only from unit D (or unit "Glory") at Tight Entrance Cave in southwestern Australia. Various ages have been estimated for this unit; Ayliffe and colleagues (2008) estimated it to be 150,000 to 110,000 years old using Optically stimulated luminescence (OSL) and EU-ESR dating, and 137,000 to 119,000 years using U–Th dating of flowstone. In 2010, Prideaux and colleagues gave a revised estimated age of 119 ± 2 to 89 ± 6 ka, with a mean of 104 ka. At the time of deposition, the area had a climate somewhat wetter than the present and was covered in closed-canopy forests.

Borungaboodie was contemporaneous with several other species of potoroine, including the burrowing bettong, brush-tailed bettong and Gilbert's potoroo. It also lived alongside the echidna Megalibgwilia ramsayi; the recently extinct Tasmanian tiger; the locally extinct Tasmanian devil; the wombat Vombatus hacketti; the diprotodontid Zygomaturus trilobus; the marsupial lion Thylacoleo carnifex; and several extinct (including Congruus kitcheneri, "Procoptodon" browneorum. Simosthenurus occidentalis and a possibly new, diminutive species of Macropus), as well as extant, species of kangaroo.
