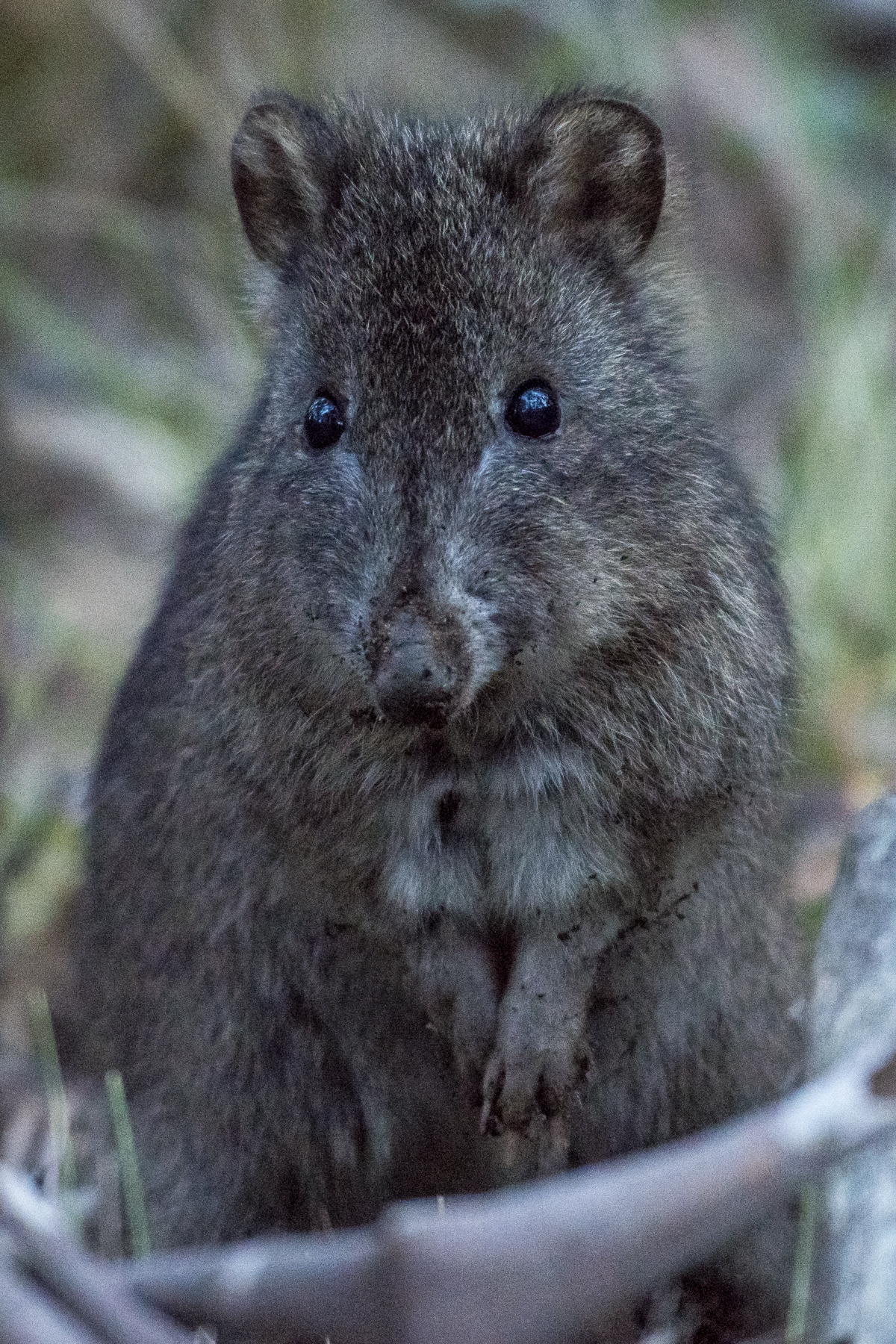
- Long-nosed potoroo in Tidbinbilla Nature Reserve, ACT, Australia

Conservation status
- Near Threatened (IUCN 3.1)

Scientific classification
- Kingdom: Animalia
- Phylum: Chordata
- Class: Mammalia
- Infraclass: Marsupialia
- Order: Diprotodontia
- Family: Potoroidae
- Genus: Potorous
- Species: P. tridactylus

Binomial name
- Potorous tridactylus (Kerr, 1792)

Subspecies
- Potorous tridactylus tridactylus; Potorous tridactylus apicalis
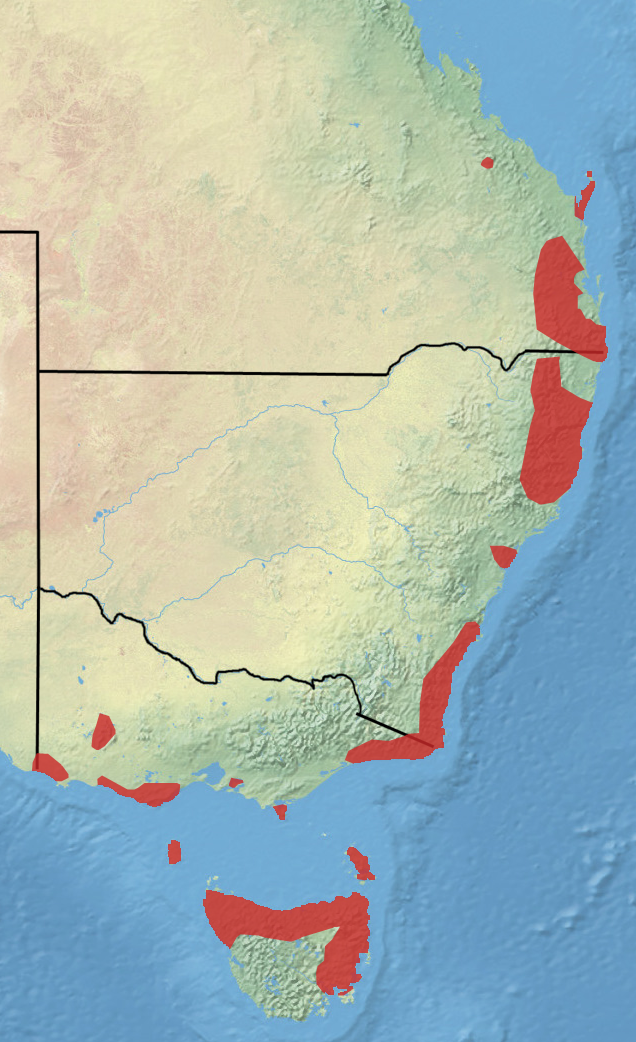
- Distribution of the long-nosed potoroo

= Long-nosed potoroo =

Species of marsupial

The long-nosed potoroo (Potorous tridactylus) is a small, hopping mammal native to forests and shrubland of southeastern Australia and Tasmania. A member of the potoroo and bettong family (Potoroidae), it lives alone and digs at night for fungi, roots, or small insects. It is also a marsupial (like kangaroos) and carries its young in a pouch. The long-nosed potoroo is threatened by habitat loss and introduced species such as cats or foxes. There are two subspecies: P. t. tridactylus on mainland Australia, and P. t. apicalis on Tasmania, with lighter fur.

At first glance, the long-nosed potoroo with its pointed nose and grey-brown fur looks very much like a bandicoot — that is, until it hops away with its front feet tucked into its chest, revealing its close relationship with the kangaroo family. The long-nosed potoroo exhibits many morphological specializations such as an elongated pointed rostral region (nose), erect ears, large eyes, claws for digging, and long robust hind legs. It is only a small marsupial, with a body length between 34 and 38 cm (13–15 in), and a semi-prehensile tail length of 15 to 24 cm (5.9–9.4 in).

As it is rarely seen in the wild, better indicators of its presence are the runways it makes through the undergrowth and the hollow diggings it leaves behind when feeding on underground roots and fungi.

== Taxonomy ==
The species was first noted in 1790 by John White in a record of his journey to Botany Bay. The informal description named the animal as a "Poto Roo" or "Kangaroo Rat" and was accompanied by an illustration.

The classification of the genus Potorous has seen the name subjected to frequent revisions. The following is a summary of the associated species and subspecies,

- genus Potorous

- P. gilbertii (Gilbert's potoroo)
- P. longipes (long-footed potoroo)
- P. platyops (broad-faced potoroo), † modern extinction
- P. tridactylus (long-nosed potoroo)

- Potorous tridactylus tridactylus
- Potorous tridactylus apicalis

== Habitat and distribution ==
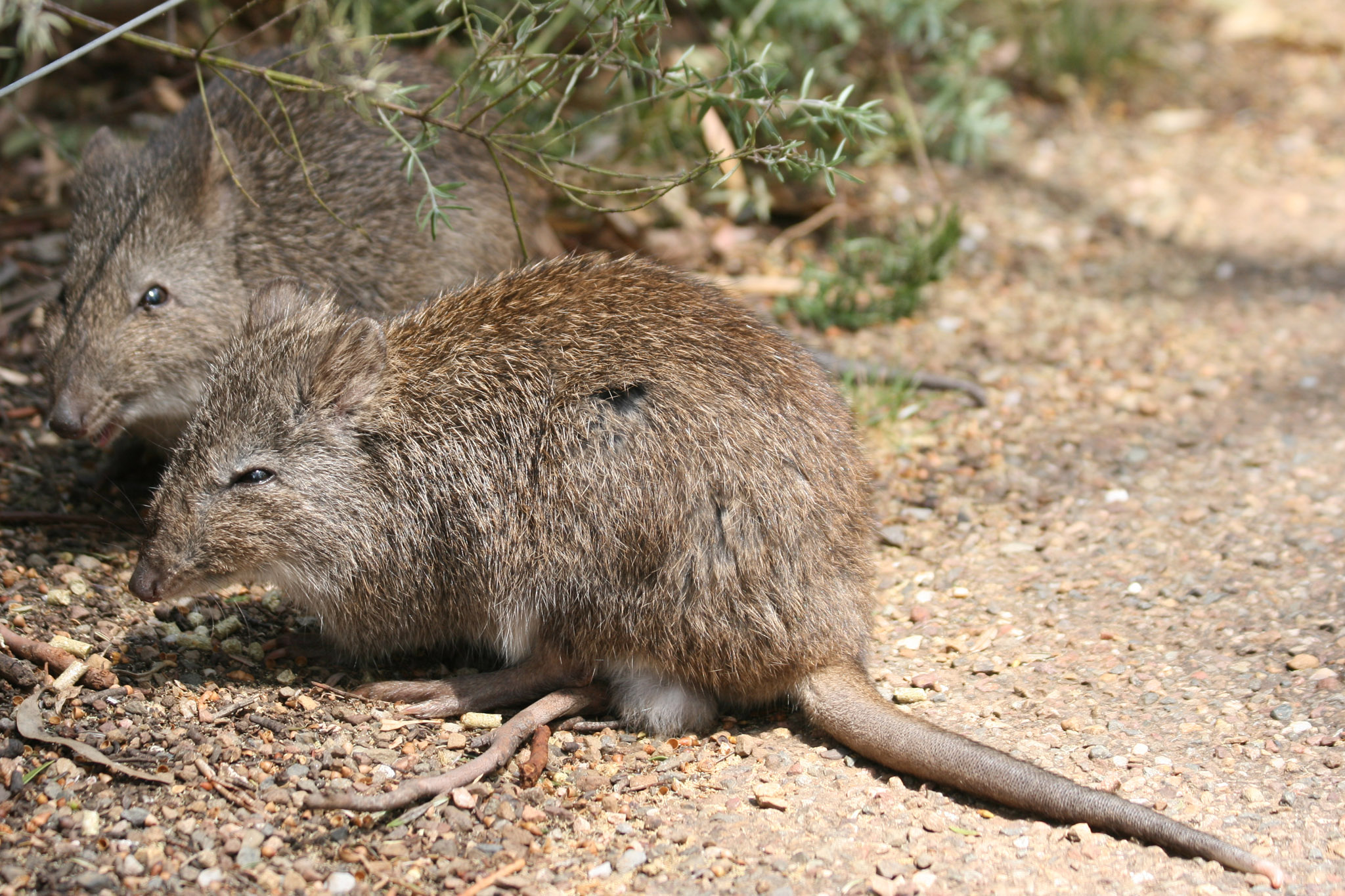
A pair of Long-nosed Potoroos.

The long-nosed potoroo is found in a variety of microhabitats located in the Southern Highlands of New South Wales and South-Western Victoria on the Australian mainland, and in Tasmania. Its bones have been found in a number of cave deposits, indicating it was once more widespread than it is today. This species prefers a range of vegetation types, from subtropical and warm temperate rainforest, through tall open forest with dense understorey, to dense coastal heaths. Its main requirement is thick groundcover, which it needs for protection and nesting material. It also prefers light soils that are easy to dig in for the underground roots and fungi that it eats.

Home-range sizes of the long-nosed potoroo vary considerably; the largest recorded was 34.4 hectares (85 acres). In Tasmania, large overlapping home ranges of 5–20 hectares (12–49 acres) have been recorded, with males typically acquiring more land than females. Home ranges in Victoria, however, are much smaller.

== Life history and behaviour ==
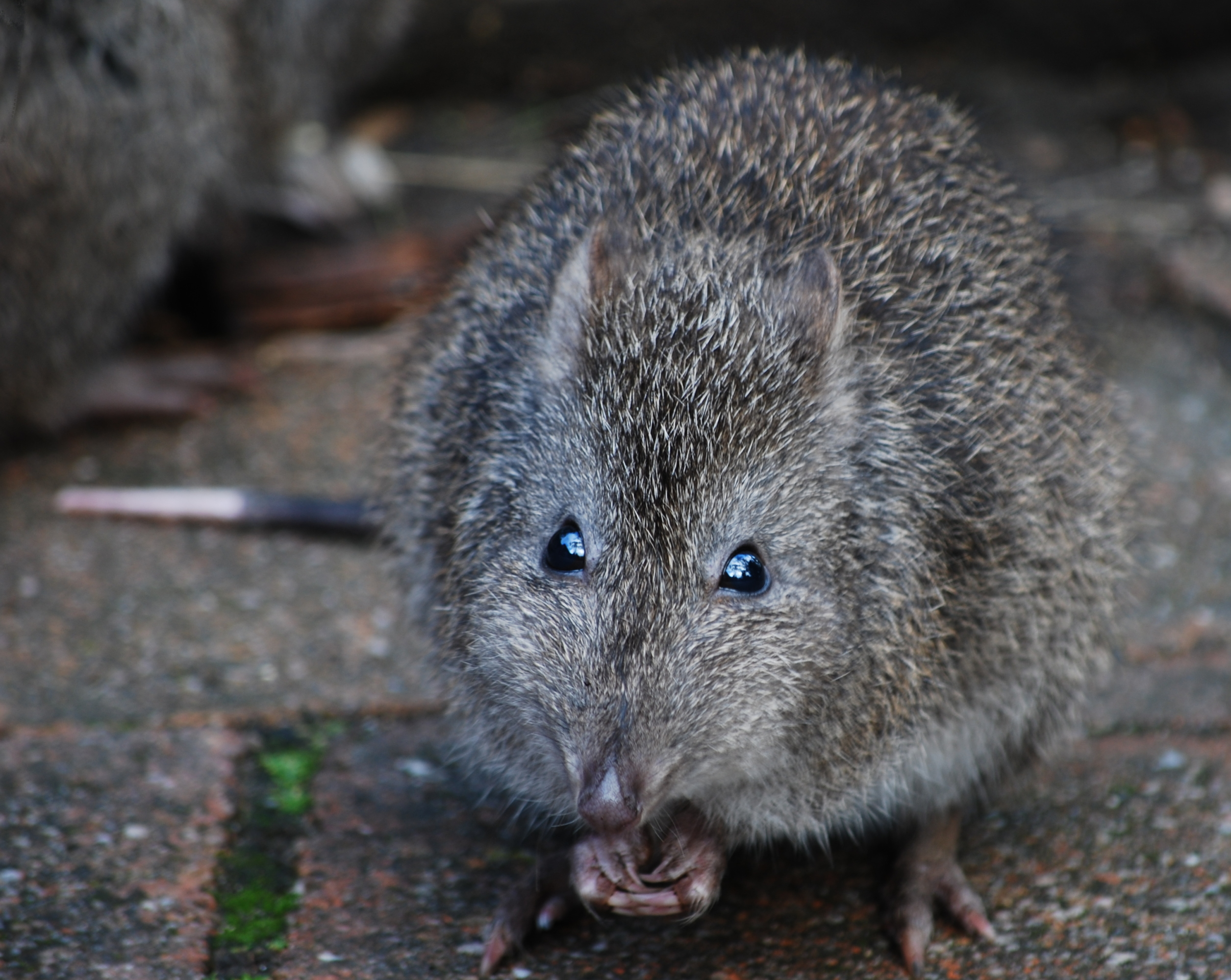
Long-nosed Potoroo

Generally, the long-nosed potoroo is solitary and has only been observed in brief encounters for mating and when with young. There have also been reports of several males and females feeding in loose aggregations. These mammals are non-territorial and frequently have overlapping home ranges. The male's home range can overlap many females', but the female's home range is usually exclusive, allowing the female access to the male year round. Breeding, however, usually occurs from late winter to early summer. Females are polyestrous and can have up to two reproductive sessions per year.

The long-nosed potoroo is nocturnal, spending much of its time within the shelter of understorey vegetation. It uses long, slightly curved claws on its front feet to dig up its food. It is an omnivore and eats underground fruiting bodies of fungi, roots, fruit, flowers, seeds, and insects and their larvae. Fungi are the main dietary component, and are a very important resource in the potoroo's diet, with at least 50 species consumed depending on seasonal variation. During the fall and winter months, potoroos primarily consume fungi and seeds, while in the spring and summer months, the amount of arthropods, plant tissue, fruits, and flowers consumed increases.

The long-nosed potoroo sniffs the ground with a side to side motion near the vicinity of food. Once the long-nosed potoroo has located a possible food source (with its sense of smell), it positions itself to begin excavating with its forepaws.

Because it eats fungi, it spreads fungal spores in its droppings. Some of these fungi grow on the roots of native plants and assist the plant in the uptake of nutrients from the soil.

== Threatening processes ==
The long-nosed potoroo was one of the first marsupials to be described by European settlers. Unfortunately, these encounters were followed by the clearing of much of its habitat for grazing and other land uses.

Threats to the long-nosed potoroo include feral cats, wild dogs, red foxes, human settlement, and fragmentation for agriculture, livestock grazing, habitat degradation, habitat clearance/loss, and inappropriate fire regimes. The pattern of burning in areas of remaining habitat has also changed, with more severe and more frequent fires creating a sparse understorey that provides little shelter for small mammals like the potoroo.

This species is listed as Near Threatened according to the IUCN red list, Vulnerable in Queensland according to the Nature Conservation Act 1992 and also nationally by the Environment Protection and Biodiversity Conservation Act 1999. It is listed under the Flora and Fauna Guarantee Act 1988 as endangered in Victoria.

== Recovery actions ==
Past conservation initiatives listed the long-nosed potoroo under the Flora and Fauna Guarantee Act of 1988, construction of conservation reserves at Barren Ground Nature Reserve and Budderoo National Park, and the preparation of a recovery plan which outlines priorities for species research. A completed national recovery plan is still a work in progress, however, the Department of Environment and Conservation has prepared a (PAS) Priorities Action Statement in order to help aid in the recovery of threatened species in New South Wales.

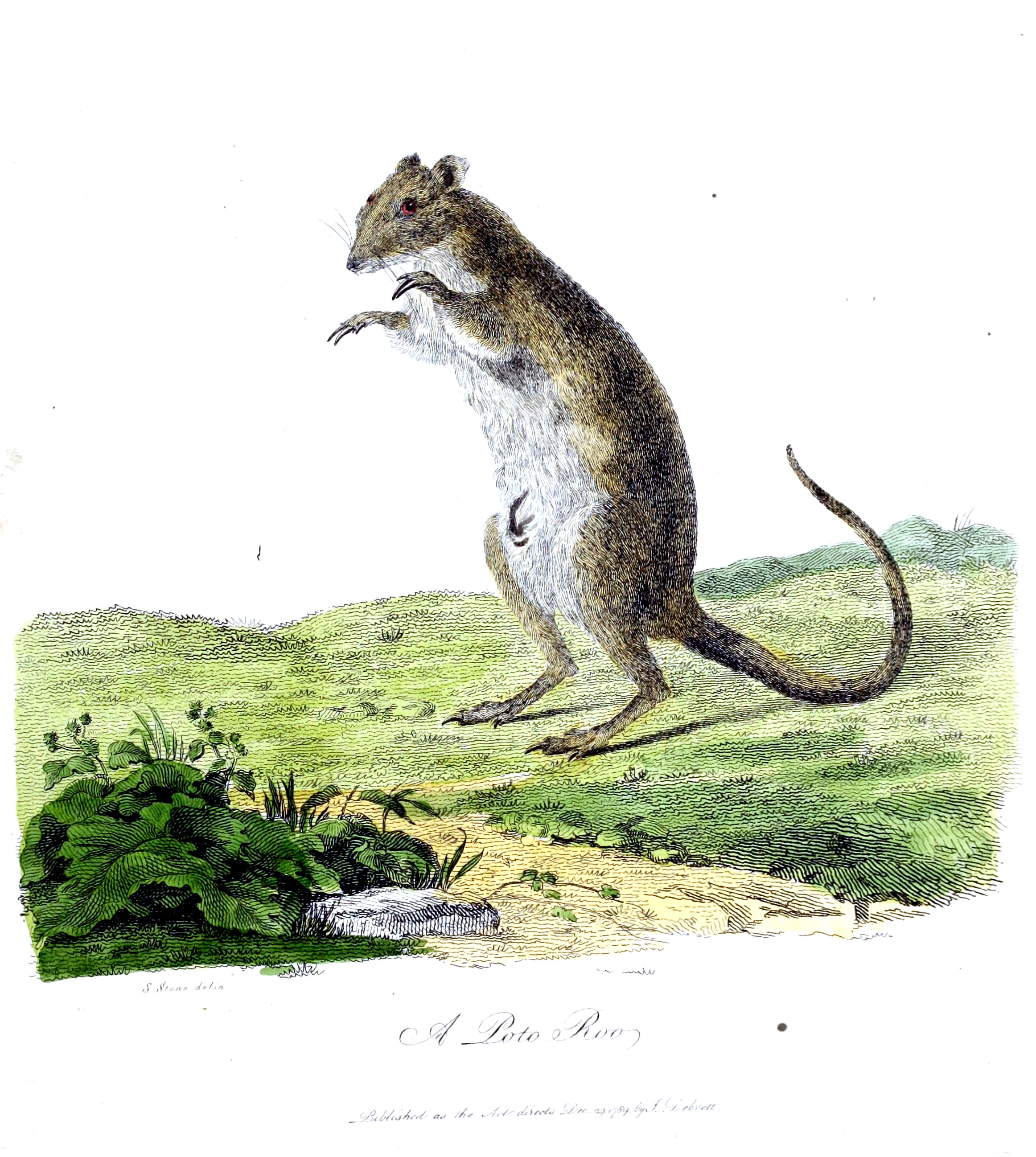
Illustration by Sarah Stone for John White, 1790

This statement encourages:

- Controlling fox population
- Controlling weeds that affect habitat
- Enforcing appropriate fire regimes
- Increasing habitat by creating barriers/corridors linking habitat patches
- Preventing spread of disease (Phytophthora sp.)
- Restricting livestock from habitat
- Pursue formal protection of remaining areas of known habitat
- Inform public
- Researching:
  - Estimate population sizes and densities using survey methods
  - Genetic differences between populations
  - Diet preference
  - Effects of disturbance on fungi species(e.g. fertilizer use)
  - Effects of predation on populations
  - Determine need for captive breeding-reintroduction programs

There is ongoing monitoring of the long-nosed potoroo while a recovery plan is being prepared for this species.
