= Palaeopotorous =

Palaeopotorous Temporal range: Late Oligocene (possible middle Miocene records)
- Comparison of upper molars of Palaeopotorous priscus (c) with other non-vombatiform diprotodontians

Scientific classification
- Kingdom: Animalia
- Phylum: Chordata
- Class: Mammalia
- Infraclass: Marsupialia
- Order: Diprotodontia
- Suborder: Macropodiformes
- Genus: †Palaeopotorous; Flannery & Rich, 1986

Type species
- †Palaeopotorous priscus Flannery & Rich, 1986

Extinct species of marsupial

Palaeopotorous (lit. 'old potoroo') is an extinct genus of macropod known from the Oligocene Namba Formation of central Australia. The genus contains a single species, Palaeopotorous priscus, known from several isolated teeth. It was once thought to be closely related to modern potoroos and bettongs, but is now known to be a stem macropodiform.

== Discovery and naming ==
P. priscus type locality in South Australia

The Palaeopotorous fossil remains were discovered in the Tom O's Quarry, representing outcrops of the Namba Formation. This locality is situated on the west side of Lake Tarkarooloo in South Australia. It was originally thought to date from the Middle Miocene, but more recent research has provided conflicting dates, possibly as old as the Late Oligocene. The holotype specimen, catalogued as SAM P24243, consists of an unworn second lower molar. Isolated upper and lower teeth found in the same spot as the holotype were tentatively referred to this taxon.

In 1986, Tim Flannery and Tom Rich described Palaeopotorous priscus as a new genus and species of macropod based on these remains. The genus name is a combination of the Latin word "palaeo", meaning old, and potoroo, a type of rat-kangaroo. The species name is derived from the Latin word "priscus", meaning ancient.

In 2016, palaeontologist Leah R.S. Schwartz reported the discovery of several macropod teeth from the mid-Miocene Bullock Creek Local Fauna in the Northern Territory, which is estimated to be 17-12 million years old. The teeth are very similar in morphology to the upper molars of P. priscus, and were identified as cf. Palaeopotorous.

== Description ==
Palaeopotorous differs from all other macropods by the presence of a slight postmetacristid ridge, and a lingually (towards the tongue) curved cristid obliqua that comes to an end near the longitudinal midline of the lower molars. The molars are low crowned and bunolophodont, having rounded cusps and prominent ridges running transversely along (across) their occlusal surfaces. All lower molars have a protolophid that is narrower than the hypolophid. The first lower molar possesses a distinct protostylid. Its trigonid has an L-shaped crest, which is formed by the paracristid, protoconid and metaconid. A weakly developed hypolophid connects to the posthypocristid. A fissure is present on its buccal (cheek) end. The posthypocristid joins the postentocristid to form a U-shaped posterior cingulum. The second and third molar are similar in morphology to the first molar.

In the first upper molar, the protoloph and metaloph are subequal in width. The front and back sides of the tooth are surrounded by well developed cingula. Both a midlink, formed by the postprotocrista and prehypocrista, and postlink are present. A conule runs down the front face of the protoloph.

== Classification ==
- Macropodiformes
  - Palaeopotorous priscus
  - Macropodoidea
    - - Hypsiprymnodon
      - - Propleopinae
        - Balbaridae
    - - crown Potoroidae
      - - Sthenurinae
        - crown Macropodidae

Phylogenetic hypothesis from den Boer & Kear (2018)

When first described in 1986 by Flannery and Rich, Palaeopotorous was assigned to the monotypic subfamily Palaeopotoroinae within the family Potoroidae. However, the authors noted that it shares only one synapomorphy with potoroids and that there is very little to suggest that it was not sister taxon to all other macropodoids.

In his PhD thesis in 1997, Bernard Cooke speculated that it was a primitive member of Bulungamayinae, a subfamily within the Macropodidae. Characters of the upper teeth supporting this viewpoint were the presence of a 'forelink', 'postlink' and a stylar cusp in the position of stylar cusp C.

To test the relationships and affinities of Palaeopotorous, den Boer and Kear (2018) used geometric morphometrics and included it in the phylogenetic matrix of Butler et al. (2016). The precise relationships depended on the analytical techniques used. Most versions placed P. priscus outside of crown Macropodoidea, as a stem macropodiform.

== Paleoenvironment ==
The fossil remains of Palaeopotorous are known from the Tarkarooloo Local Fauna of the Namba Formation. It is derived from the upper unnamed member and is the stratigraphically highest (youngest) faunal assemblage of the formation. Palynology from near the top of the formation indicates the presence of taxa like the eucalypts, Acacia, Dodonaea, and Hakea or Grevillea, suggesting dry sclerophyll forest and swamp environments.

The Tarkarooloo Local Fauna contains a vast diversity of marsupials. Possums are especially abundant and are represented by the ektopodontids Ektopodon and Ngathachunia, the mirilinid Mirilina, the pseudocheirid Pildra, and the pilkipildrid Pilkipildra. Other mammals include the koala Madakoala, the diprotodontid Ngapakaldia, the wynyardiid Namilamadeta, and the macropods Nambaroo and Gumardee. Aquatic vertebrates such as the lungfish Neoceratodus and the turtle Emydura are also known from this faunal assemblage.
