= Bulungamayinae =

Bulungamayinae Temporal range: Late Oligocene–recent

Scientific classification
- Kingdom: Animalia
- Phylum: Chordata
- Class: Mammalia
- Infraclass: Marsupialia
- Order: Diprotodontia
- Family: Potoroidae
- Subfamily: †Bulungamayinae; Flannery et al, 1821.

Extinct subfamily of marsupials

Bulungamayinae is an extinct subfamily that allies fossil species of marsupials, showing close morphological features found in the modern potoroines, the bettongs and potoroos of Australia.

The group possess characteristics of their dentition that place them in an alliance with the modern potoroos, smaller long nosed fungivores that dig and burrow. The premolars and incisors resemble the other potoroines, yet the molars accord with the herbivorous macropodids such as the kangaroos. Other characteristics of the ancestral group are found the two divergent families, and they were larger than modern potoroine species at around five to ten kilograms in weight, slightly more than the largest, the species Aepyprymnus rufescens.

The genera within the subfamilial arrangement of Potoroidae may be summarised as follows,

- family Potoroidae

- subfamily †Palaeopotoroinae
- subfamily Potoroinae
- subfamily †Bulungamayinae

- genus Bulungamaya
- genus Ganguroo
