= William Webb (naturalist) =

William Webb (1834?–1897) was a collector and trader of plants and animals, active in the region around King George Sound in Southwest Australia.

== Biography ==
William Webb was born sometime around 1834 in Staffordshire, England, and emigrated to Albany, Western Australia in 1862. He is thought to have partnered with another collector of the region, George Maxwell, and advertised his series in local newspapers. His activity in distributing specimens to scientific collection continued into the 1890s, continuing the business after Maxwell's death in 1880. He died in 1897.

== Works ==
Amongst the specimens provided by Webb is the 1874 collection of Potorous platyops, the last of a small marsupial species named moda, a series of five animals forwarded and held at the Macleay Museum in Sydney.

The botanist Ferdinand von Mueller notes the purchase of algae from a Mr Webb, assumed to be this individual, as the trader but not collector of the series found at Israelite Bay. He is mentioned by J. C. Hassell as collecting in his company at Mount Manypeaks and the Torbay region west of Albany, at Nornalup, and elsewhere. Hassell gives a record of hearing the noisy scrub bird, Atrichornis clamosus, a rare and elusive species with a piercing and unmistakable call.
