= John Hilary Seebeck =

John Hilary Seebeck (1939–2003) was a mammalogist active in research and conservation in Victoria, Australia. His published work includes a description of a new species of rat-kangaroo, Potorous longipes, in 1980. Seebeck was instrumental in the advances toward protection and rehabilitation of native animals of the state, and an active member of several naturalist societies; he is noted for his tutoring or mentoring of secondary and tertiary students. His research and publications often incorporated historical literature on mammals in his region, and a bibliographic list of his works was compiled by Peter Menkhorst.
