= Sarah Stone (artist) =

English natural history illustrator (1760–1844)

- Born: Sarah Stone; 3 September 1759; London, England
- Died: 11 January 1844 (aged 84); London, England
- Known for: Illustrator
- Style: Botanical illustration
- Spouse: John Langdale Smith

Sarah Stone (3 September 1759 – 11 January 1844), later known as Sarah Smith, was a British natural history illustrator and painter. Her works included many studies of specimens brought back to England from expeditions in Australia and the Pacific. Her illustrations are amongst the first studies of many species and are as scientifically significant.

== Work ==
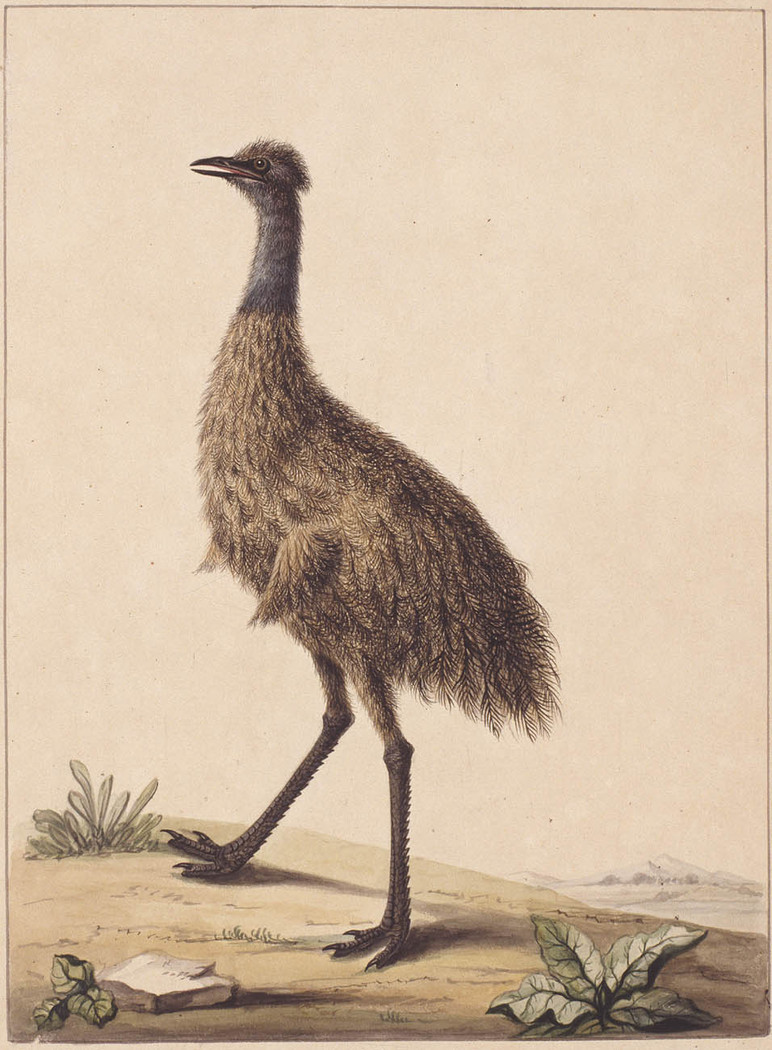
New Holland Cassowary by Sarah Stone c. 1789–1790

Stone was the daughter of a fan painter. She worked as a draftsman, natural history and scientific illustrator, and painter between 1777 and 1820. She was commissioned by Sir Ashton Lever in the 1770s to sketch and paint images of objects in his Leverian Museum. which included specimens brought back by British expeditions to Australia, the Americas, Africa and the Far East in the 1780s and 1790s. She exhibited as an "Honorary Exhibitor" at the Royal Academy of Arts in 1781, 1785 and 1786.

Stone created numerous watercolour paintings of specimens sent by John White, the First Surgeon General of the Australian colony, between 1789 and 1790. These paintings were used to produce engravings for White's A Journal of a Voyage to New South Wales (1790). Although beautiful and skilfully drawn the drawings were sometimes compromised by the fact that she was working from skins collected in Australia and reconstructed by a taxidermist in London to reproduce an animal or bird that had never been seen.

Her collection of more than a thousand water colours based on specimens from the Leverian Museum were dispersed along with the museum items auctioned in 1806. Some of her paintings were acquired by the Natural History Museum, London while others went into private collections. They may be valuable in resolving some species described by J. F. Gmelin, the specimens of which are now untraceable.

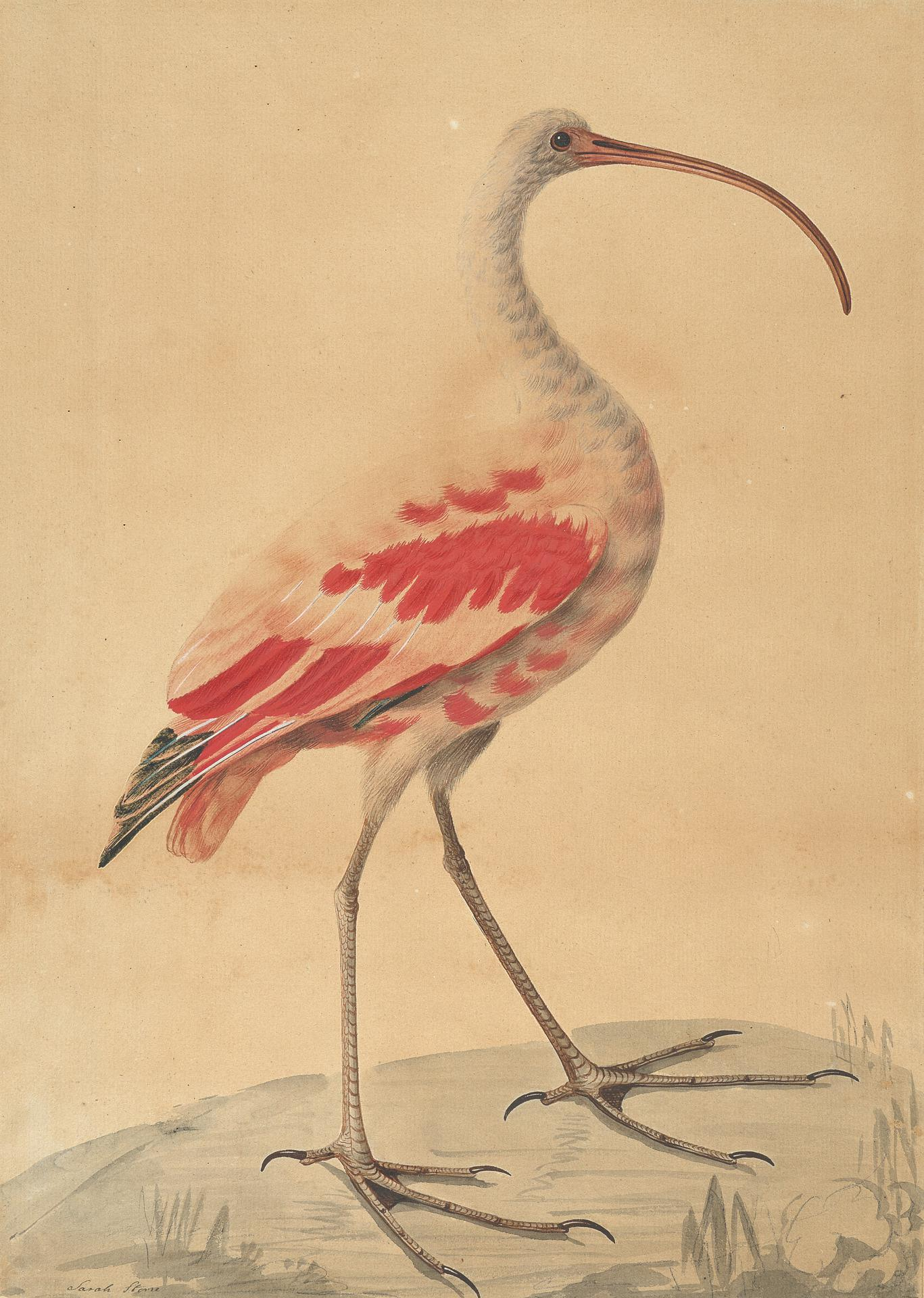
A Scarlet Ibis watercolor painting by Sarah Stone c.1786

Sarah Stone once created an artwork featuring a rare Heva Tūpāpāʻu funeral costume, collected by Captain Cook during a voyage to Tahiti.

Stone's work is held by the British Museum and the Victoria Gallery and Museum, University of Liverpool in Great Britain, and the National Library of Australia, and the State Library of New South Wales in Australia.

== Personal life ==
On 8 September 1789 Stone married John Langdale Smith.

== Gallery ==
Images by Sarah Stone – A journal of a voyage to New South Wales.

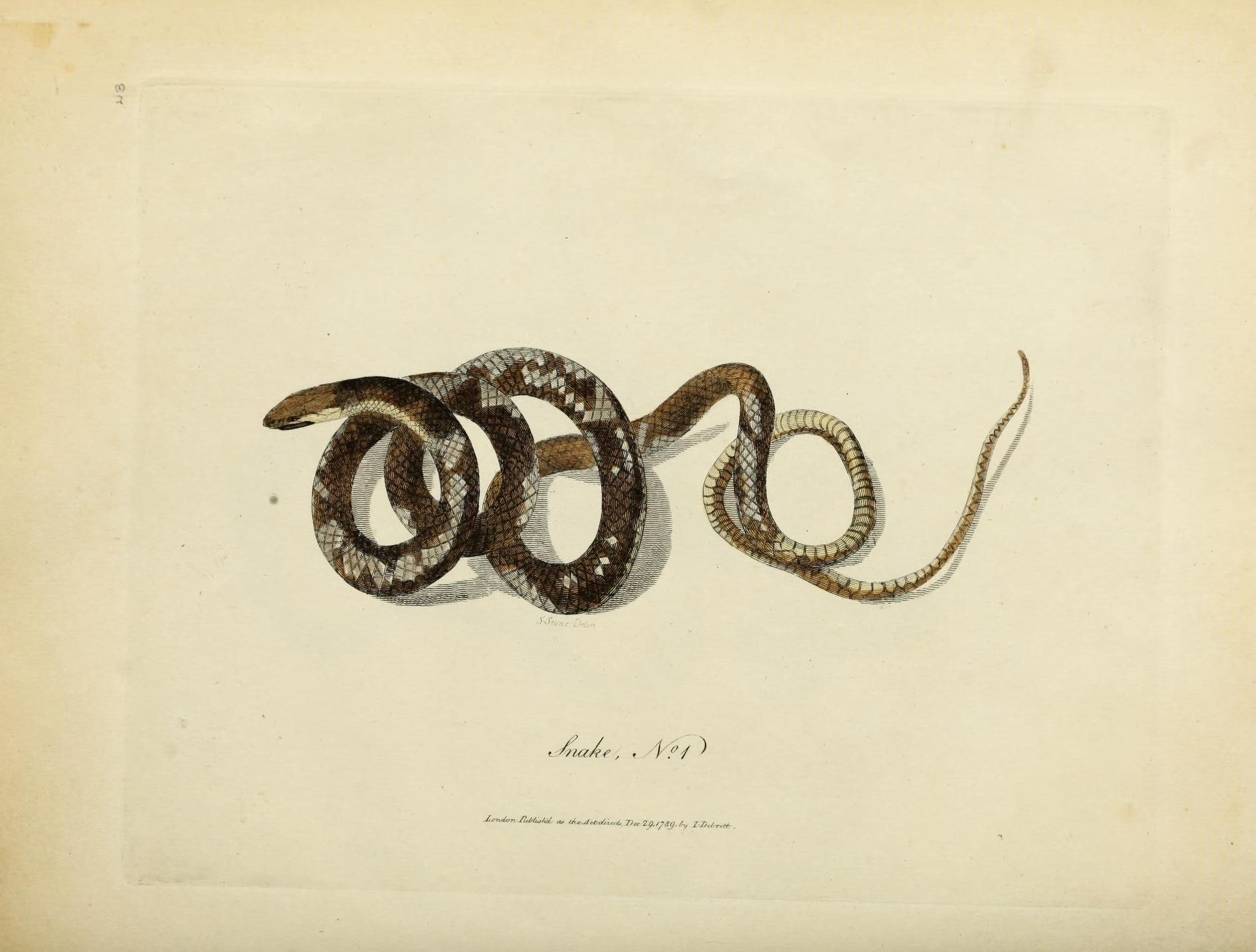
Snake no. 1

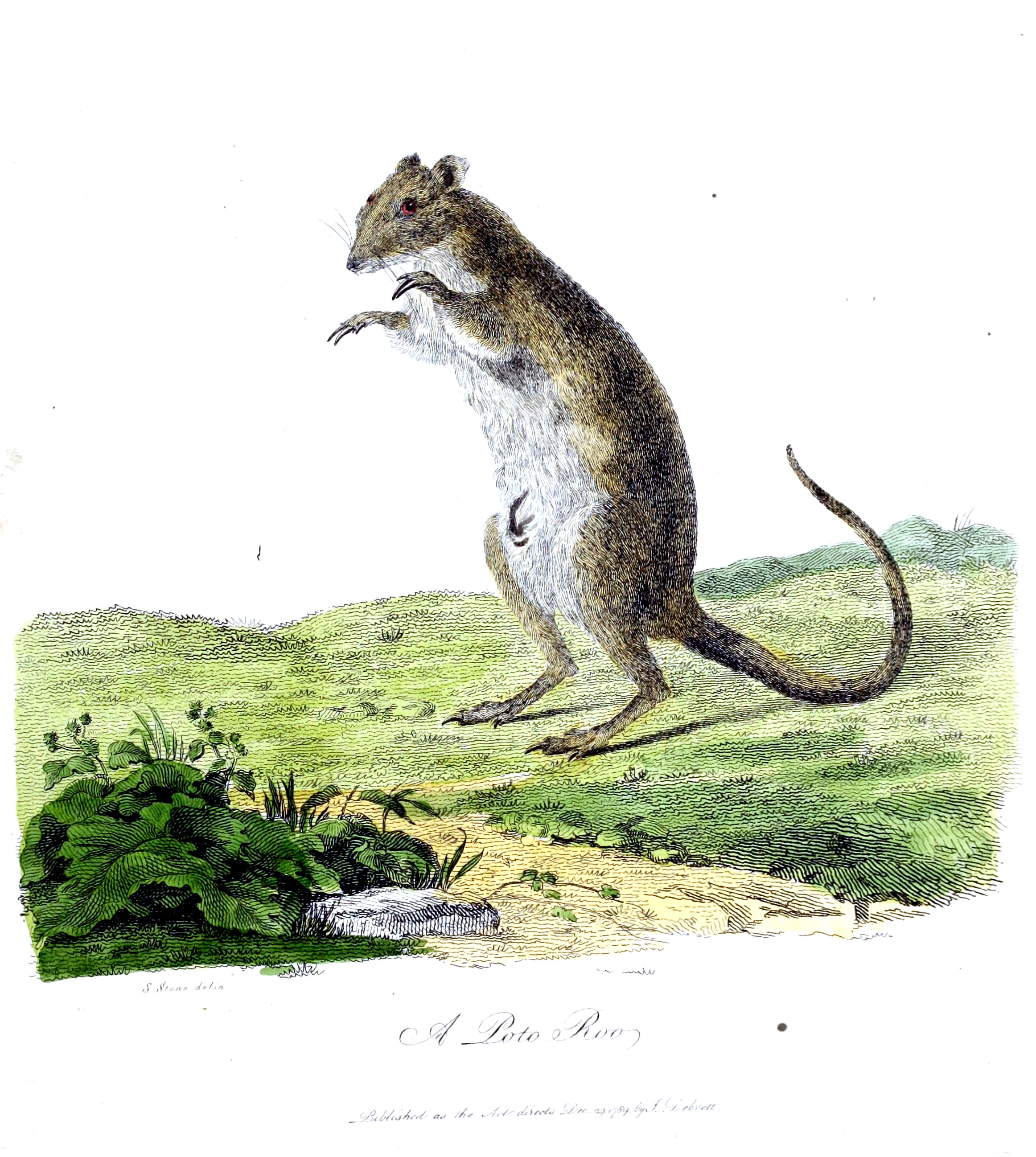
Poto Roo, an illustration of Potorous tridactylus

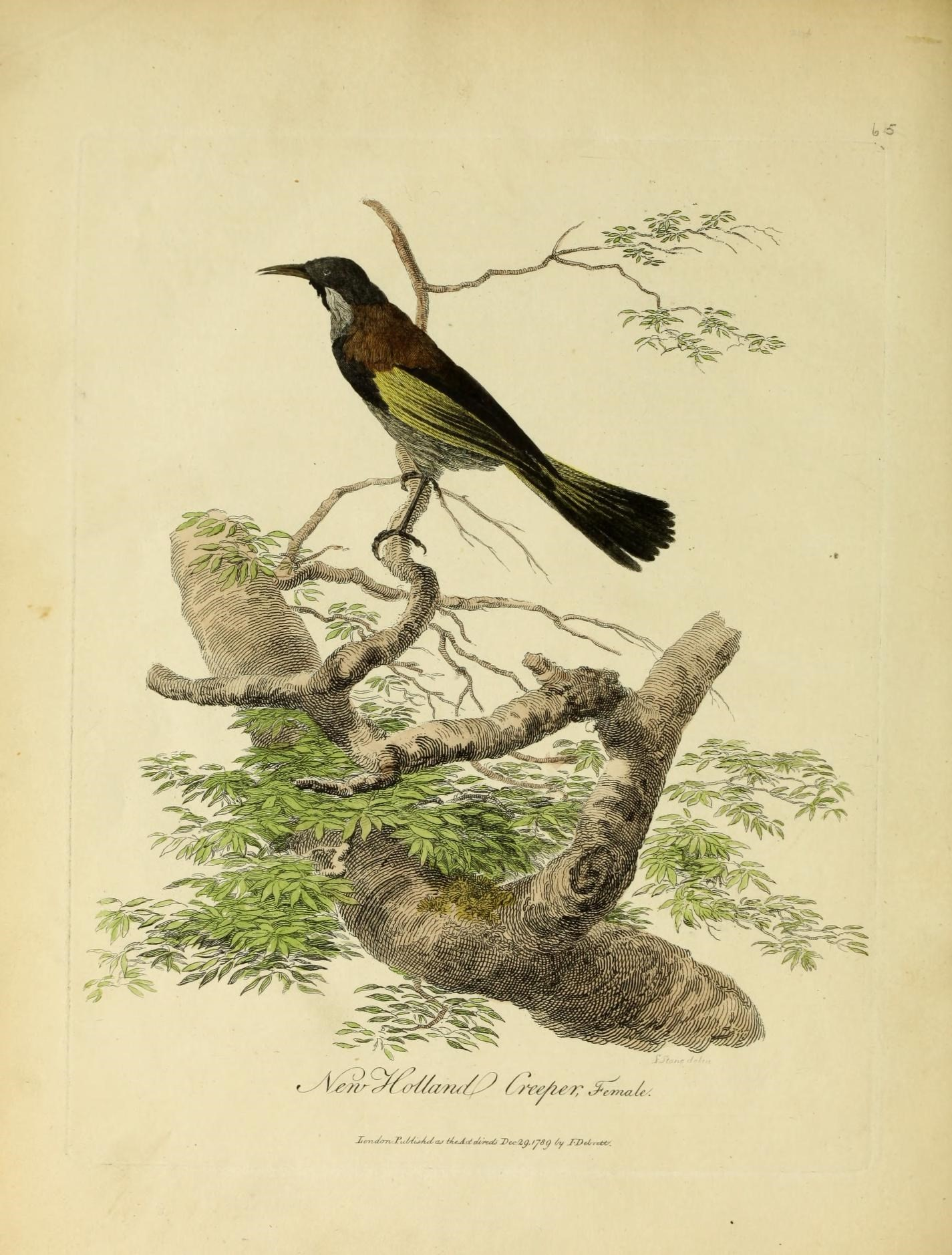
New Holland creeper, female
