= Hedley Herbert Finlayson =

Hedley Herbert Finlayson (1895–1991) was an Australian mammalogist, author and photographer. Associated with the South Australian Museum, he is recognised for his extensive surveys and research on mammals in Central Australia and systematically documenting the knowledge of the Indigenous peoples of the region.

== Early life ==
Born in the Australian city of Adelaide, the fourth of the five surviving children of Finette (Nettie) Finlayson née Champion, wife of Ebenezer Finlayson, an influential financier, political activist and writer at state newspaper The Register. He was schooled at Kyre College in Mitcham, South Australia (now Scotch College), and studied science at the University of Adelaide.

== Works ==
=== Chemistry ===
While studying at the University of South Australia, Finlayson became employed in a junior role by the chemistry department as a demonstrator, remaining in this position until 1918. Finlayson was injured in a series of laboratory accidents during his early career, including an explosion in 1913 resulting in the loss of his left hand and right eye. (Note: or sight in left eye (2006, S.A. Mus.)) In 1917 Finlayson joined a committee examining the properties of Xanthorrhoea (grass trees) resin, which had been exported in large quantities to Germany—before the outbreak of war between the nations—and suspected to have been used in the manufacture of explosives. Other chemistry works included the isolation of organic compounds used as colorants from the herbaceous carnivore Drosera whittakeri.

=== Zoology ===
Finlayson began research in mammalogy and was appointed to honorary positions at the South Australian Museum, continuing there in a curatorial role until 1965. His early interest in mammals may have been influenced by the work in Australia of English scientist Wood Jones. By the time of his appointment, he had already deposited specimens of animals with the museum. His field work was primarily focused on mammals of the arid centre of Australia, in his own state and the Northern Territory. Finlayson was also an accomplished photographer and made extensive use of this skill in documenting his journeys and findings. His records and annotations are noted as meticulous in detail and registration.

The explorations and field research Finlayson undertook were self-funded, among them four significant expeditions to remote and arid regions during austral summers of the early 1930s. He coordinated his searches with pastoralists and local peoples and recorded species of small and medium-sized mammals of remote and poorly known central regions. He visited inland regions within the state, extending to the east of Victoria and into the territory in the north. A variety of records and specimens of mammals were obtained on these journeys, but Finlayson took an especial interest in larger marsupials known locally as toolache (Macropus greyi), the brusher and ti tree wallaby. Other expeditions were to Mount Buffalo near Benalla in Victoria and a three-month survey of Dawson Valley at the Queensland coast. At the Queensland site he investigated subspecies of macropods, kangaroos and wallabies, and other marsupial species including possums, gliders, koalas and bandicoots. A skull of species Caloprymnus campestris, the desert rat-kangaroo not recorded since 1843, was forwarded to Finlayson. In response he journeyed out to Clifton Hill Station at Diamantina, later registered as Diamantina National Park, and made the last collection of the species and the first in ninety years; this field work is regarded as a highlight of his long career.

H. H. Finlayson issued over sixty papers in his field, five of which were published in the prestigious journal Nature. He recorded approximately five thousand film negatives of central Australian landscapes and other subject matter, which are conserved in the Northern Territory archives. He was the author of a book on the Australian interior, The Red Centre (1935), reprinted eight times. He made extensive use of the zoological information provided by the Aboriginal peoples of central desert regions, documenting their intimate knowledge of the species that still inhabited, or had disappeared from, their local environment.

Finlayson supplemented his own private collection with specimens he obtained on his expeditions, and this is said to have caused a rift with the directors of the South Australian Museum. When Finlayson retired as curator after four decades of unpaid service, the board established the position as a salaried one, much to Finlayson's chagrin and spurring him to remove his series of animal specimens from the institution in protest. He bequeathed his private collection to the Museum of Central Australia.

A biographer described Finlayson as a private individual who never married and disclosed little of his personal life.

== Legacy ==
The title of Finlayson's book The Red Centre is reported to have popularised the term for the deserts of Australia.

He was honoured for his research in the epithet and appellation of a microbat, the central Australian species Vespadelus finlaysoni, referred to as Finlayson's cave bat.
