= Long-footed potoroo =

Conservation status
- Vulnerable (IUCN 3.1)

Scientific classification
- Kingdom: Animalia
- Phylum: Chordata
- Class: Mammalia
- Infraclass: Marsupialia
- Order: Diprotodontia
- Family: Potoroidae
- Genus: Potorous
- Species: P. longipes

Binomial name
- Potorous longipes Seebeck & Johnston, 1980

Species of marsupial

The long-footed potoroo (Potorous longipes) is a small marsupial found in southeastern Australia, restricted to an area around the coastal border between New South Wales and Victoria. It was first recorded in 1967 when an adult male was caught in a dog trap in the forest southwest of Bonang, Victoria. It is classified as vulnerable.

P. longipes is the largest species of Potorous, resembling the long-nosed potoroo, Potorous tridactylus. It is a solitary, nocturnal creature, feeding on fungi, vegetation, and small invertebrates. It differs from P. tridactylus in its larger feet and longer tail.

Current threats to the species include predation by introduced feral cats and foxes, and loss of habitat from logging within its limited range.

== Taxonomy ==
The scientific name of the animal commonly known as the long-footed potoroo is Potorous longipes. Potoroo is the common name for all of the three other species in the genus Potorous, Gilbert's potoroo, P. gilbertii, the broad-faced potoroo, P. platyops, and long-nosed potoroo, P. tridactylus. P. longipes is the largest potoroo, and most resembles P. tridactylus. The species was first recorded in 1967 in the East Gippsland region of Victoria, Australia. The formal description was published in 1980. Remains of the long-footed potoroo were found in predator droppings in 1986.

== Description and anatomy ==
The long-footed potoroo is a very rare marsupial only found in Australia. A potoroo is a small type of kangaroo-like marsupial. It is about the size of a rabbit and its common name suggests, it has very long hind feet. These feet have long toes with very strong claws. The species is the largest potoroos with males weighing up to 2.3 kg (5.1 lb) and females 1.4 kg (3.1 lb). The entire body length is 380–415 mm (15.0–16.3 in). The tail can be between 315 and 325 mm (12.4 and 12.8 in) in length, while the hind foot is 103–114 mm (4.1–4.5 in). This animal can be differentiated from other potoroos by its long back feet, which are the same length relative to its head. It has an extra footpad called the hallcual pad. The long-footed potoroo hops in a similar fashion to a kangaroo, yet can use its tail to grasp objects. It has a soft, dense coat, with grayish-brown fur that slowly fades into a lighter color on the feet and belly.

== Behavior and life history ==
=== Habitat and distribution ===
The long-footed potoroo lives in a range of montane forests. It has also been found in the warmer temperate rainforest. This species lives where the soil is constantly moist. It spends its day time sleeping in a nest on the ground in a hidden, sheltered area. An essential feature of the long-footed potoroo's habitat is the dense vegetation cover that supplies protection and shelter from predators. This species was not known to science until 1967, so historically, it is inadequately understood. It has a very restricted area where it lives. The main populations can be found in Victoria, in the Barry Mountains, which is in the northeast part of the state, and in the East Gippsland, located in the far east. A smaller population lives north of the Victorian border in the south-east forest of New South Wales.

It was reported in October 2025 that images of a long-footed potoroo were recorded on a camera that was set up to monitor feral cats in the Kosciuszko National Park in southern New South Wales. This was the first time the marsupial was found within the park.

=== Population ===
The long-footed potoroo is very difficult to find in the wild due to its shy behavior. The National Recovery Plan states that a few thousand individuals are unlikely to remain in the wild as of now; only a few hundred long-footed potoroos may survive.

=== Diet ===
Long-footed potoroos' diet normally consists of up to 91% of fruiting fungi found under ground. They are known to consume up to 58 different species of fungi as part of their diet. These underground fungi are also called sporocarps or truffles. If necessary, they may also eat fruits, plant material, and soil-dwelling invertebrates. Their jaws have shearing premolars and molars that are rounded at the top, indicating a varied diet is consumed.

The long-footed potoroo plays a part in the symbiotic relationship between the fungi (Ectomycorrhizae) and the trees. It helps this relationship by releasing the spores of the fruiting fungi through its fecal material. In turn, this helps keep the forest healthy, benefiting both the fungi and the forest. The species of fungi that are eaten in the winter and summer are similar, but the amount of each type of fungal species varies between seasons and years. It has a sacculated fore stomach in which bacterial fermentation occurs. This aids in the breakdown of fungal cell walls.

=== Behavior and communication ===
The long-footed potoroo is very shy and elusive. It can produce a vocalization, a low kiss kiss sound when stressed or to communicate to its offspring. Although the long-footed potoroo is a nocturnal species, it may partake in early-morning basking in the sun. The long-footed potoroo is constantly hidden from plain sight. Under normal conditions, males are not aggressive. Nevertheless, if provoked, they can become aggressive in defending their home.

=== Mating, reproduction, and parental care ===
Breeding can occur all year, yet most young are born in the winter, spring, and early summer. Higher rainfall and deep, moist soil full of leaf litter provides a stable food supply. In turn, these periods of good conditions allows breeding to occur easily. When a female is in estrus, nearby males fight with one another, until dominance is established. The species has a monogamous mating system. The gestation period is around 38 days. In captivity, the offspring stay in the mother's pouch for 140 to 150 days. The offspring then reaches sexual maturity around 2 years old. Females can give birth up to three young per year, though one or two young is most commonly seen. After the young leave the pouch, they can stay with their mothers up to 20 weeks until they become independent. They stay in the mother's territory up to 12 months before leaving. The long-footed potoroo exhibits postpartum oestrus and embryonic diapauses.

=== Movement patterns ===
The long-footed potoroo moves to different parts of its territory due to the distribution of fungi. Thus seasonally, their territory boundaries change following the distribution of truffles. Males use a larger home range area than females use. The species is territorial and the territories of mated pairs can overlap with each other, but not with other pairs. The home range of the long-footed potoroo is between 22 and 60 ha in East Gippsland and between 14 and 23 ha in north-eastern Victoria.

== Conservation issues ==
=== Status ===
As of 2006, the long-footed potoroo has been classified as endangered (EN) by the IUCN Red List. According to the IUCN Red List, the long-footed potoroo is considered endangered because its area of occurrence is less than 5,000 km^{2}. The dispersed area where the animal is found is most likely in a decline of the number of individuals due to predators and competition for food from introduced pigs. It is listed as an endangered species on schedule 1 of the New South Wales Threatened Species Conservation Act 1995. It is also considered an endangered species under the Commonwealth Environmental Protection and Biodiversity Conservation Act 1999, and as endangered by the Victorian Flora and Fauna Guarantee Act 1988.

=== Threats ===
Their most serious predators include the red fox, feral cats, and wild dogs, all invasive species. Their habitat is greatly disturbed due to building roads, thus they have seemed to move along these roads and forage for food in these areas. This also causes a threat from being hit with a motor vehicle. In Victoria, the State Forest has about half of the long-footed potoroo population. Introduced pigs may be a large competitor for the long-footed potoroo's specialized diet.

=== Conservation plans ===
Information on this rare species is spotty. Thus, to conserve it effectively, further studies on its way of life and habitat need to be conducted. Research was performed on a small captive population that was able to breed in the 1980s and 1990s at the Healesville Sanctuary. Small steps have been taken to increase the population of long-footed potoroo and to protect it from extinction. In the State Forest of Victoria, the long-footed potoroo is protected through special areas in which logging is monitored or prevented and burning of the forest has been reduced. Their natural predators such as the wild dogs, red fox and feral cats have also been put under control. This will allow the long-footed potoroo to reclaim their habitat and allow their numbers to rise again. Conservation plans such as these will not only benefit the long-footed potoroo, but will also be beneficial to other threatened animal species in this area.

=== 2019–2020 Australian bushfires ===
Over 82% of its habitat was burnt during the 2019-2020 Australian bushfires.
