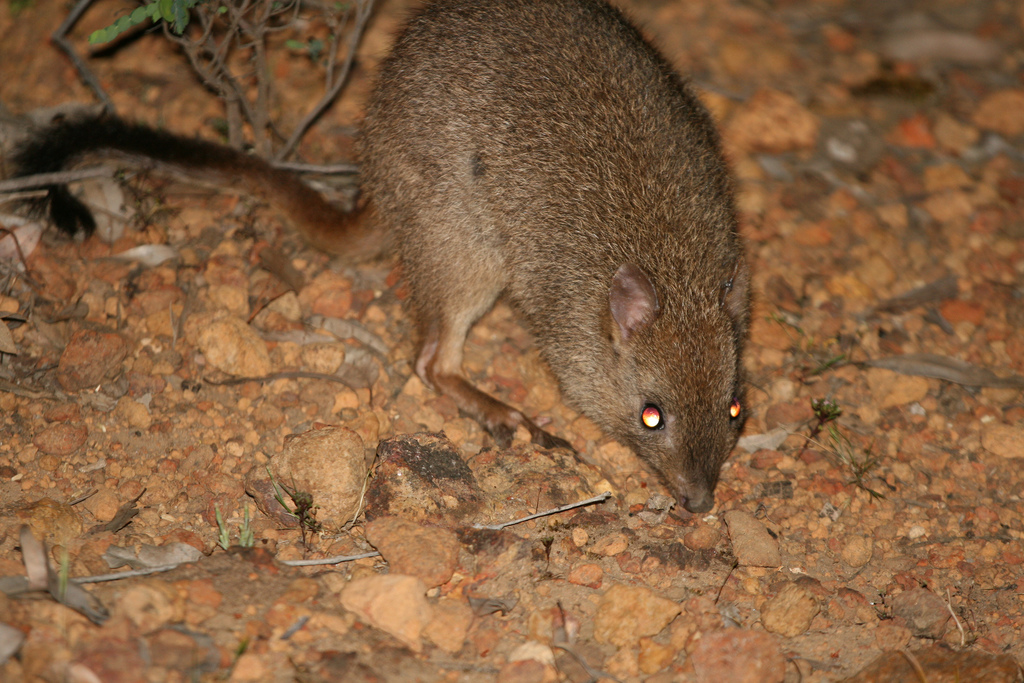
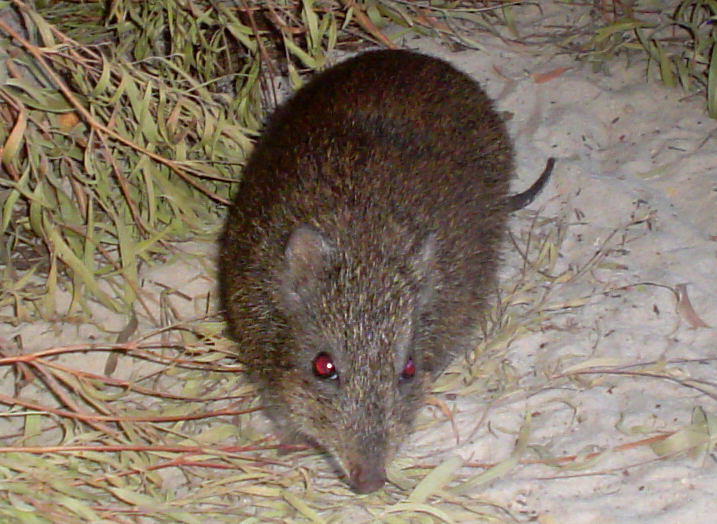
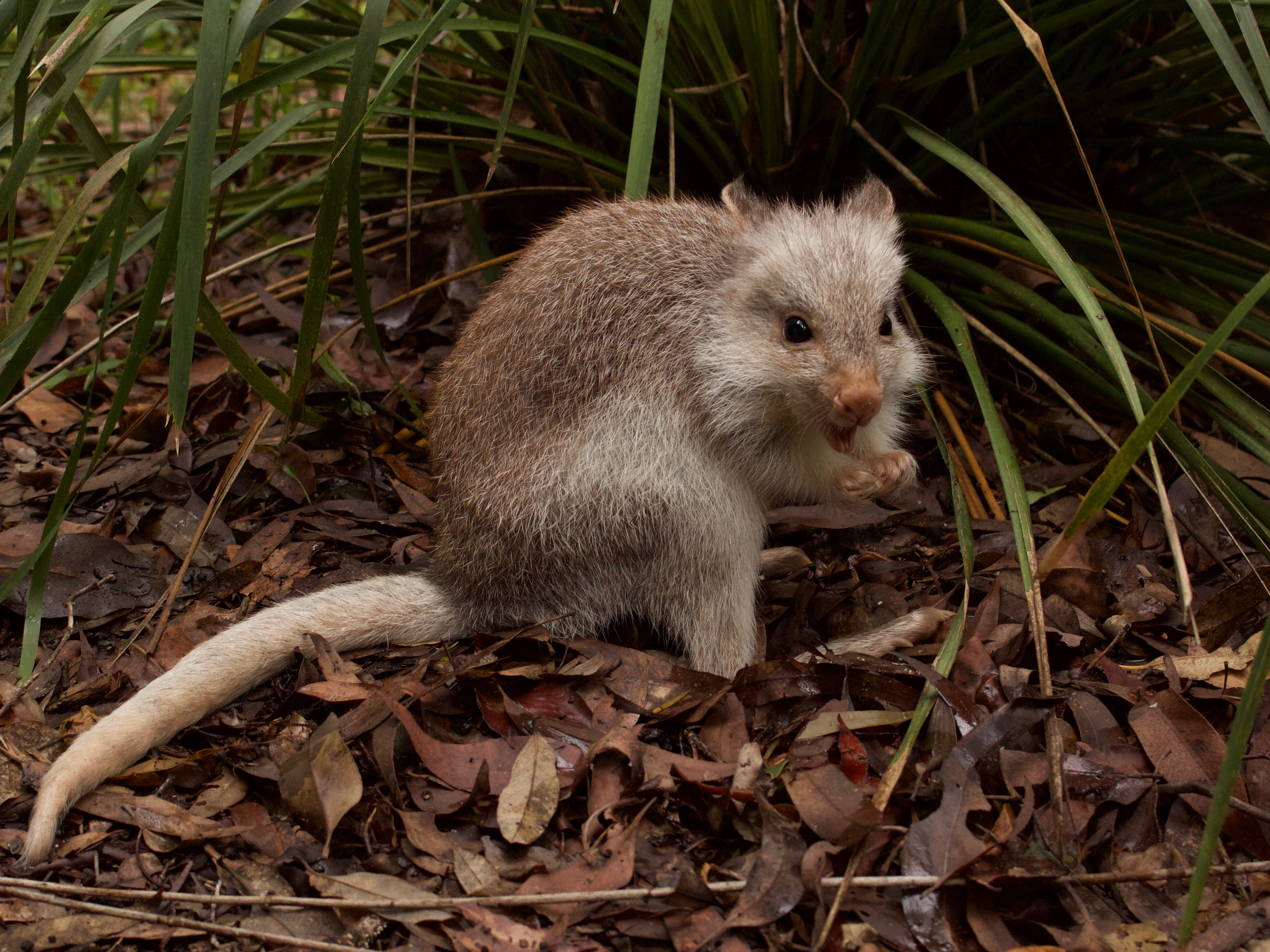
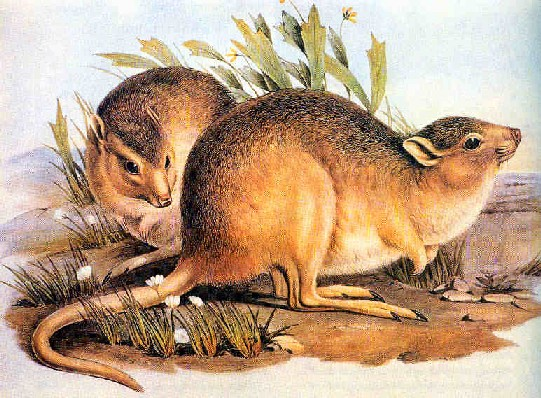
- Clockwise from top-left: Woylie, Gilbert's potoroo, Desert rat-kangaroo, and Rufous rat-kangaroo

Scientific classification
- Kingdom: Animalia
- Phylum: Chordata
- Class: Mammalia
- Infraclass: Marsupialia
- Order: Diprotodontia
- Superfamily: Macropodoidea
- Family: Potoroidae; Gray, 1821

Type genus
- Potorous Desmarest, 1804

Genera
- †Bulungamaya?; †Gumardee?; †Ngamaroo?; †Purtia?; †Wakiewakie?; Bettonginae Bensley, 1903; Aepyprymnus; Bettongia; †Borungaboodie; Caloprymnus; †Milliyowi; Palaeopotoroinae? Flannery & Rich, 1986; †Palaeopotorous; Potoroinae Gray, 1821; Potorous
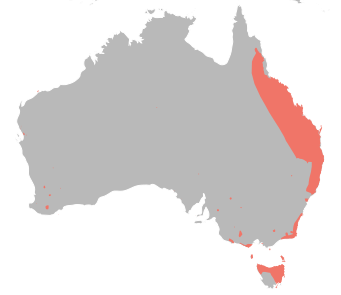
- Potoroidae distribution

= Potoroidae =

Potoroidae Temporal range: Late Oligocene–Present

Family of marsupials

Potoroidae is a family of marsupials, small Australian animals known as bettongs, potoroos, and rat-kangaroos. All are rabbit-sized, brown, jumping marsupials and resemble a large rodent or a very small wallaby.

== Taxonomy ==
The potoroids are smaller relatives of the kangaroos and wallabies, and may be ancestral to that group. In particular, the teeth show a simpler pattern than in the kangaroo family, with longer upper incisors, larger canines, and four cusps on the molars. However, both groups possess a wide diastema between the incisors and the cheek teeth, and the potoroids have a similar dental formula to their larger relatives:

Dentition
3.0-1.2.4
1.0.2.4

In most respects, however, the potoroids are similar to small wallabies. Their hind feet are elongated, and they move by hopping, although the adaptations are not as extreme as they are in true wallabies, and, like rabbits, they often use their fore limbs to move about at slower speeds.

The potoroids are, like nearly all diprotodonts, largely herbivorous. However, while they take a wide variety of plant foods, most have a particular taste for the fruiting bodies of fungi, and often depend on fungi to see them through periods when little else is available to eat in the dry Australian bush. One example of a potoroo that sustains itself on fungi is the long-footed potoroo. This animal's diet is almost entirely made up of underground fungi. This limits its habitat range as it needs to live in a moist environment, with dense cover to reduce predation from introduced species such as foxes and feral cats.

== Ecology ==
The once populous species of this family played a role in the engineering of soil, dominating the sub-storey of vegetation, and regarded as crucial to the maintenance of the friable soils that they created by digging for fungi and other subsoil foods.

== Status ==
Four modern species of bettongs are extant and two have become extinct. Bettongs were endangered because settlers took much of their habitat, and the red foxes they introduced to the continent also killed many of them. At one time, several species lived all over Australia. Today, the Tasmanian bettong lives only in the eastern half of Tasmania, and the northern bettong lives only in three isolated populations in northern Queensland.

The potoroines have exemplified the impact of ecological changes since colonisation of Australia. Most species have become extinct within their former distribution range, and are either totally extinct or conserved only by preservation in isolated habitat and re-population programs.

== Classification ==
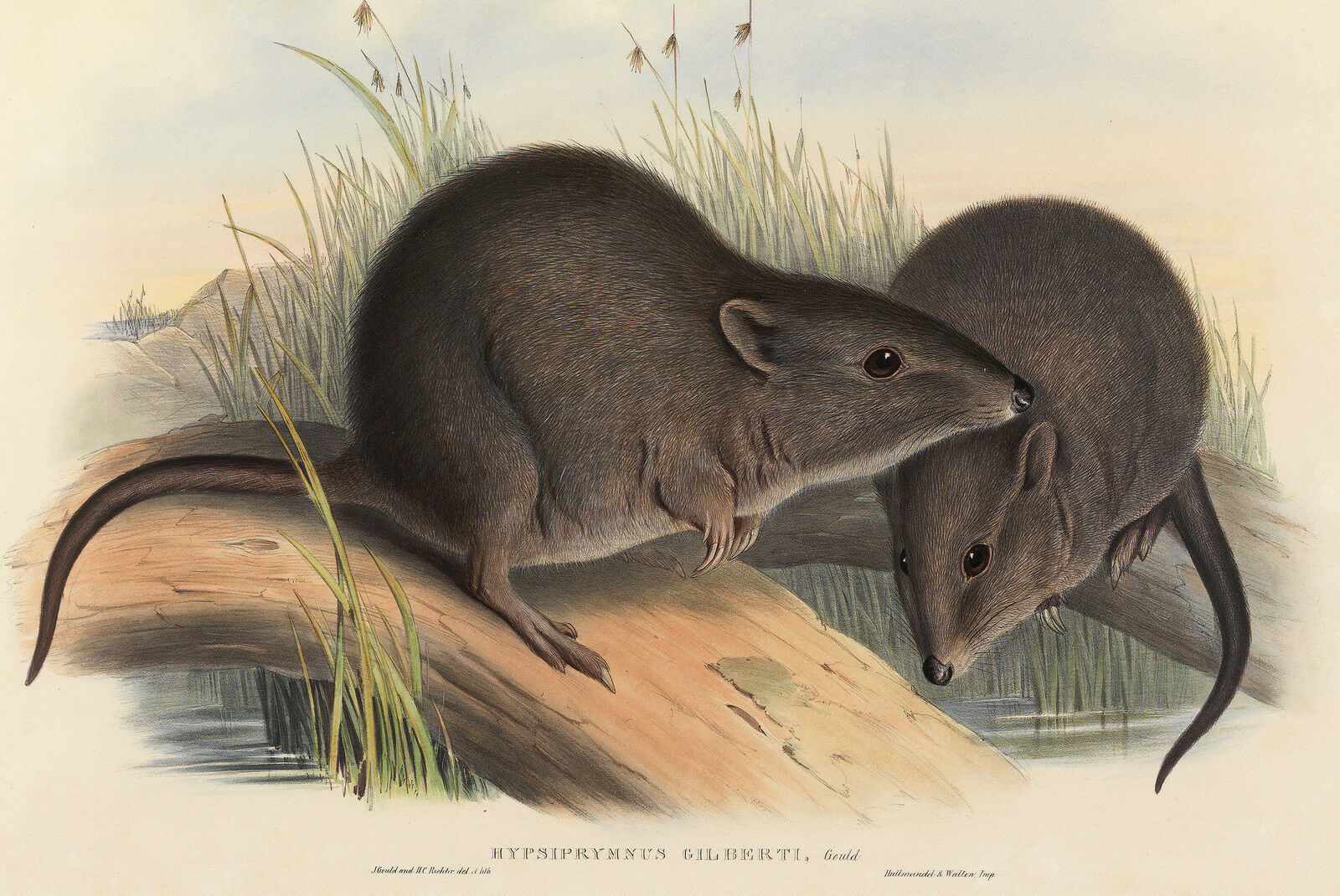
Gilbert's potoroo

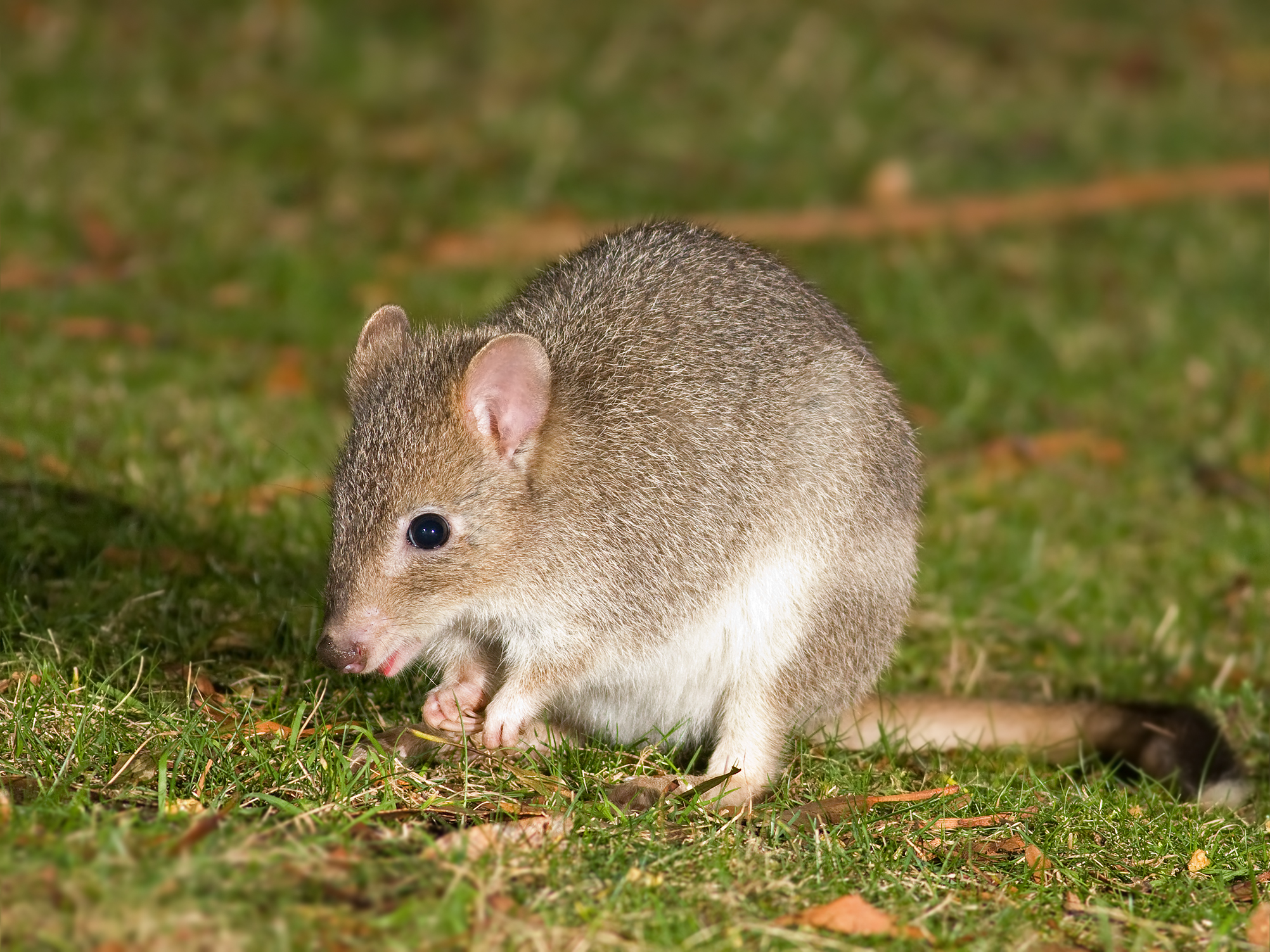
Eastern bettong

A basal branch of the macropods, the three extant genera of the Potoroidae contain eight species.

The arrangements of the related taxa have seen an arrangement of the subfamilies within Potoroidae, although an earlier classification within the family Macropodidae has also been supported by genetic studies.

A conservative arrangement of modern and fossil taxa may be summarised as:

- family Potoroidae
  - subfamily †Palaeopotoroinae
    - genus †Palaeopotorous
  - subfamily Potoroinae
    - genus †Borungaboodie
    - genus †Milliyowi
    - genus †Purtia
    - genus †Wakiewakie
    - genus †Gumardee
    - tribe Bettongini
      - genus Aepyprymnus
      - genus Bettongia
      - genus †Caloprymnus
    - tribe Potoroini
      - genus Potorous
  - subfamily †Bulungamayinae
    - genus †Bulungamaya
    - genus †Wabularoo
    - genus †Wanburoo
    - genus †Ganguroo
