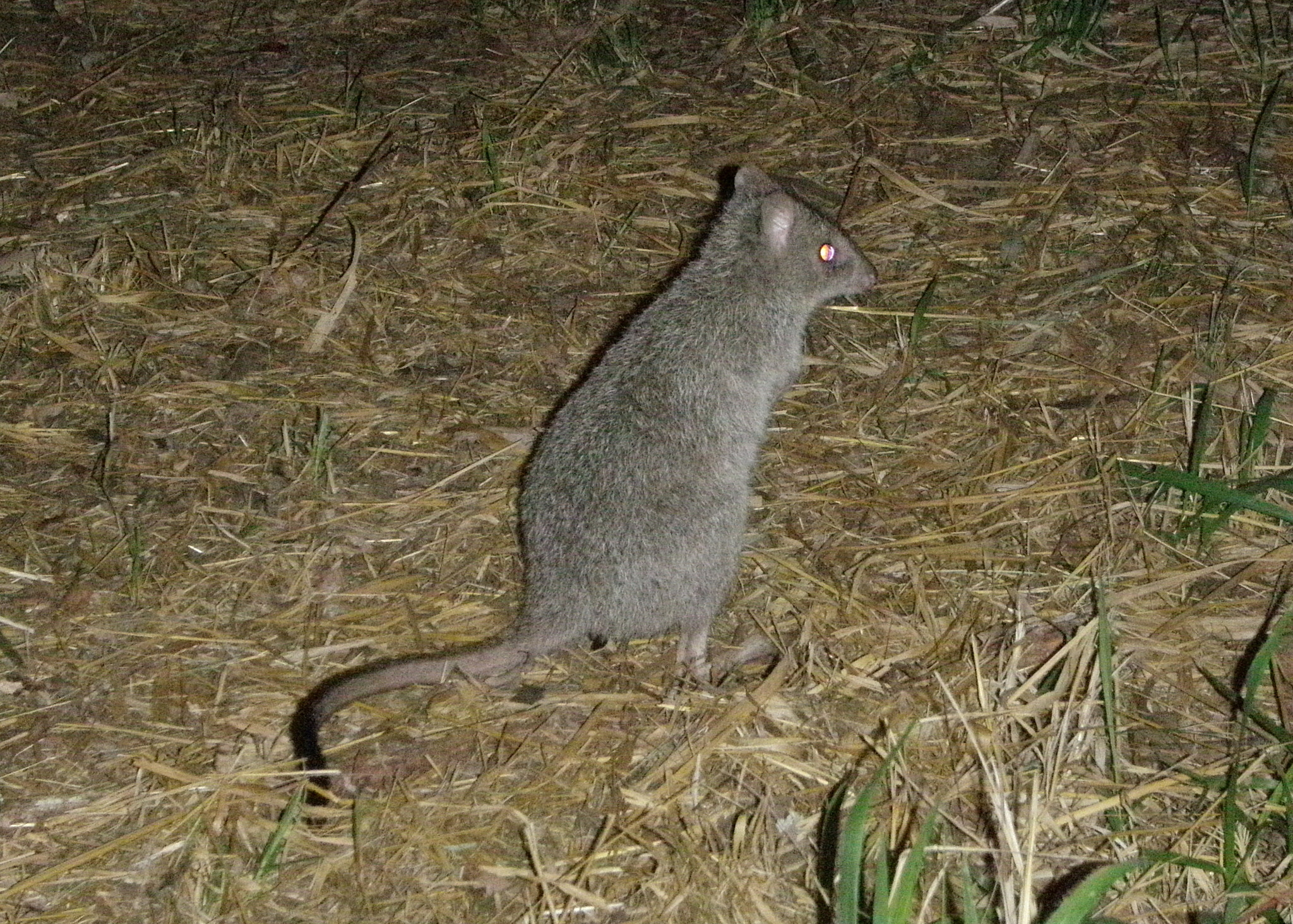
- Bettongia tropica

Scientific classification
- Kingdom: Animalia
- Phylum: Chordata
- Class: Mammalia
- Infraclass: Marsupialia
- Order: Diprotodontia
- Family: Potoroidae
- Subfamily: Potoroinae
- Tribe: Bettongini; Flannery and Archer 1987

= Bettongini =

Tribe of marsupials

Bettongini is a tribe of mammals. It contains two extant genera and one recently extinct one:

- Aepyprymnus Garrod, 1875
- Bettongia J. E. Gray, 1837
- †Caloprymnus Thomas, 1888
