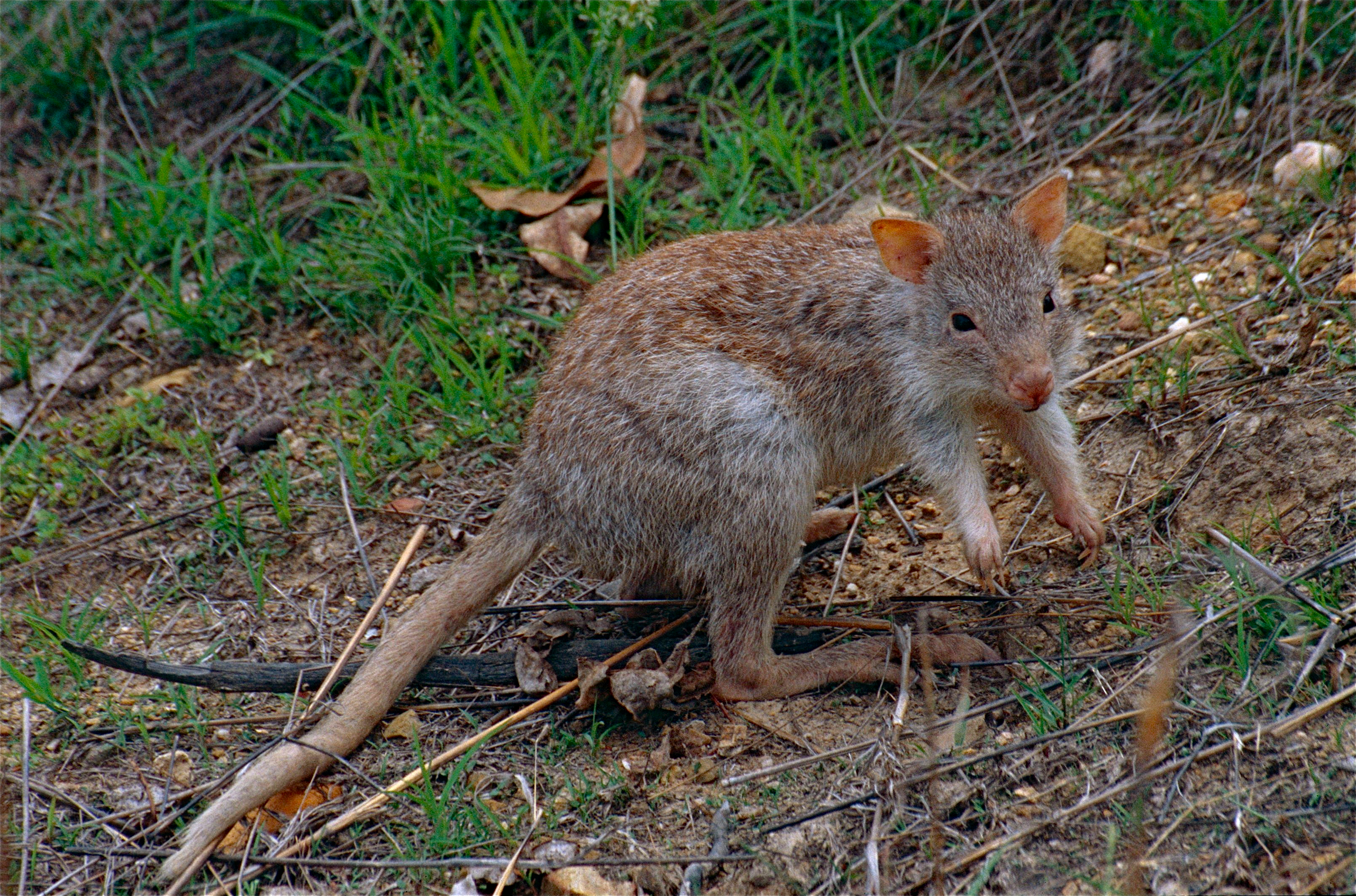

Conservation status
- Least Concern (IUCN 3.1)

Scientific classification
- Kingdom: Animalia
- Phylum: Chordata
- Class: Mammalia
- Infraclass: Marsupialia
- Order: Diprotodontia
- Family: Potoroidae
- Subfamily: Potoroinae
- Tribe: Bettongini
- Genus: Aepyprymnus; Garrod, 1875
- Species: A. rufescens

Binomial name
- Aepyprymnus rufescens (J. E. Gray, 1837)
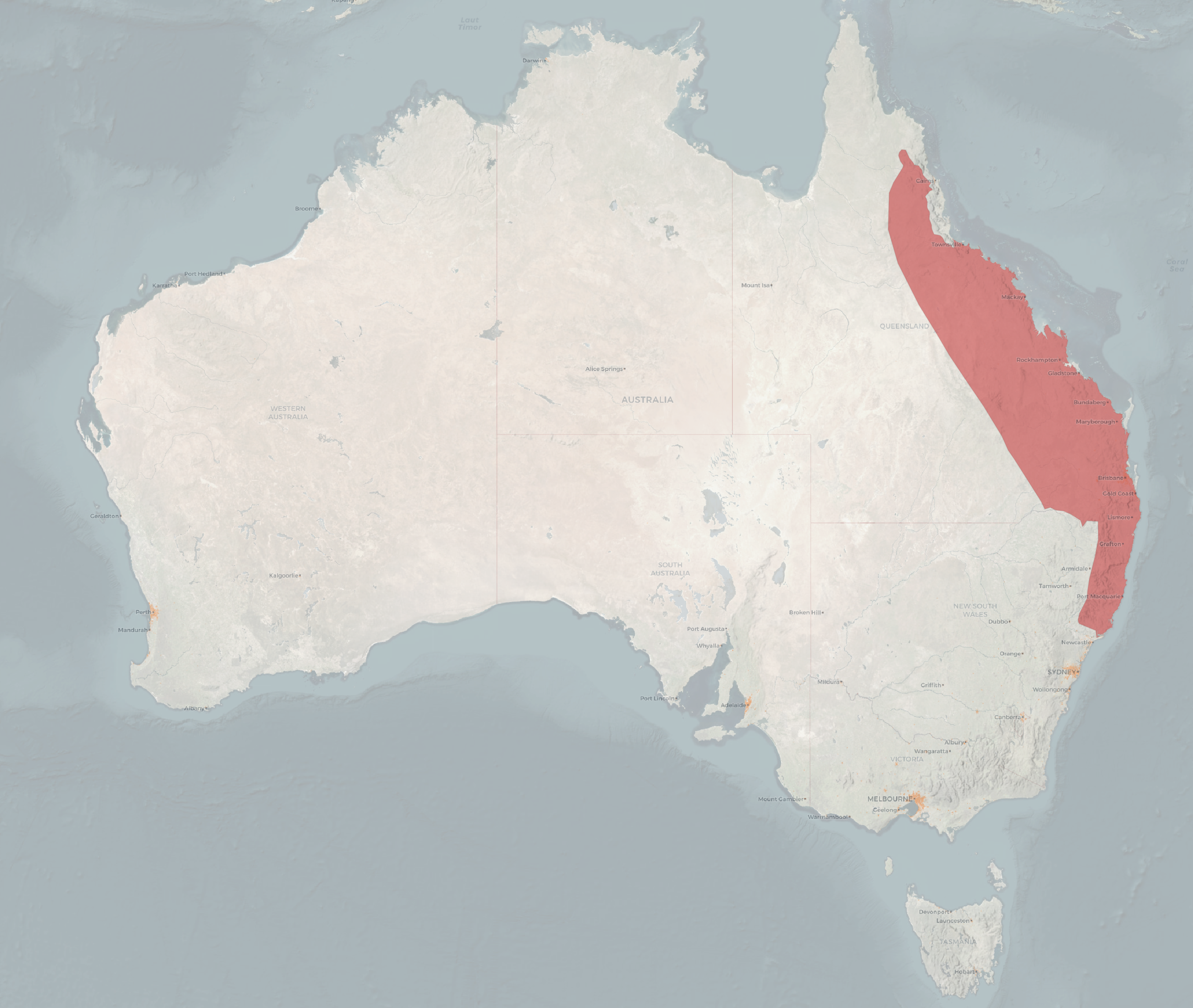
- Distribution of the rufous rat-kangaroo

= Rufous rat-kangaroo =

Species of marsupial

The rufous rat-kangaroo or rufous bettong (Aepyprymnus rufescens) is a small, jumping, rat-like marsupial native to eastern Australia. It is the only species in the genus Aepyprymnus. The largest member of the potoroo/bettong family (Potoroidae), it is about the size of a rabbit. The rufous rat-kangaroo is active at night when it digs for plant roots and fungi, and like other marsupials it carries its young in a pouch. Though its range is reduced, the population is healthy and stable.

== Taxonomy ==
The rufous rat-kangaroo is the only member of its genus, and is the largest of all the potoroids. It is generally grey with a hint of reddish brown and its scientific name means "reddish high-rump". It was once thought of as a solitary, nocturnal animal, but recent observation indicates that the rufous rat-kangaroo may form loose, polygynous associations. It feeds mostly on tubers and fungi, but also on leaves and other vegetation.

== Description ==
A species of the family Potoroidae (potoroos & bettongs), small to medium marsupials that include the living Potorous (potoroos) and Bettongia (bettongs). They are not closely related to others of the family, and the largest extant potoroine species, and their characteristics have them placed within a monotypic genus.

Aepyprymnus rufescens is distinguished by the ruffled and bristly hair of the pelage and rufous tint of the fur at the upper parts. The hair across the back is predominantly grey, the rufous tinge more evident, and is interspersed with silvery hairs. An indistinct stripe appears at the hip line. The underparts are also grey, although paler. The combined head and body length is 385 to 390 millimetres. The tail may be from 340 to 390 mm in length, and excepting a white tip that may appear the colour is overall grey-brown. The ears are comparatively long, 48 to 57 mm, with a triangular form. The colour of the ears is very dark at the outer side and pink at the interior, the fringe is lined with silver hairs. A hairless pink rim appears around the eye. The weight range is from 2.5 to 3.5 kilograms.

A similar species, the northern Bettongia tropica, may be distinguished by the lack of shaggy fur with a rufous tinge, their blackish tail, and this species hairless pink ring at the eye and pointy triangular ears.

The vocalisation includes an alarm call, a soft hissing sound, another sound like a chainsaw when in aggressive postures and they regularly emit a grunting noises during normal activity.

== Reproduction ==
Breeding occurs throughout the year, once the female has reached maturity, generally at 11 months. The male reaches maturity between 12 and 13 months. Once mature, the female is capable of breeding at three-week intervals. The gestation of the young is about 22–24 days. After the young are born, they live within the pouch for about 16 weeks. Upon leaving the pouch, the joey stays near the mother for about 7 weeks, while it gets used to fending for itself.

== Behaviour ==
The species may share nests or be solitary, a male may cohabit with one or two females. The nest is located beneath a dense under-story of vegetation, a shallow clearing that is matted with woven plant material. The foraging activity is strictly nocturnal, they will only emerge after sunset and return to the nest before first light. The posture varies with the activity of the species, assuming an upright position on the hind parts to survey its surroundings, drawing the forelimbs to the chest when hopping rapidly away from a threat, and resting on all four limbs and the tail when slowly moving during feeding.

The favoured foods are subterranean fruiting bodies of fungi and tubers, and the species have strong clawed forelimbs that allow them to excavate these. Other foodstuffs consumed include some insect larvae, the stems of sedge-like plants, grasses and seeds.

The museum collector Charles M. Hoy noted that the species entered his camp at night, eating pieces of bread but ignoring the vegetable scraps.

== Distribution and habitat ==
It is found in coastal and subcoastal regions from Newcastle in New South Wales to Cooktown in Queensland, and was formerly found in the Murray River Valley of New South Wales and Victoria.
