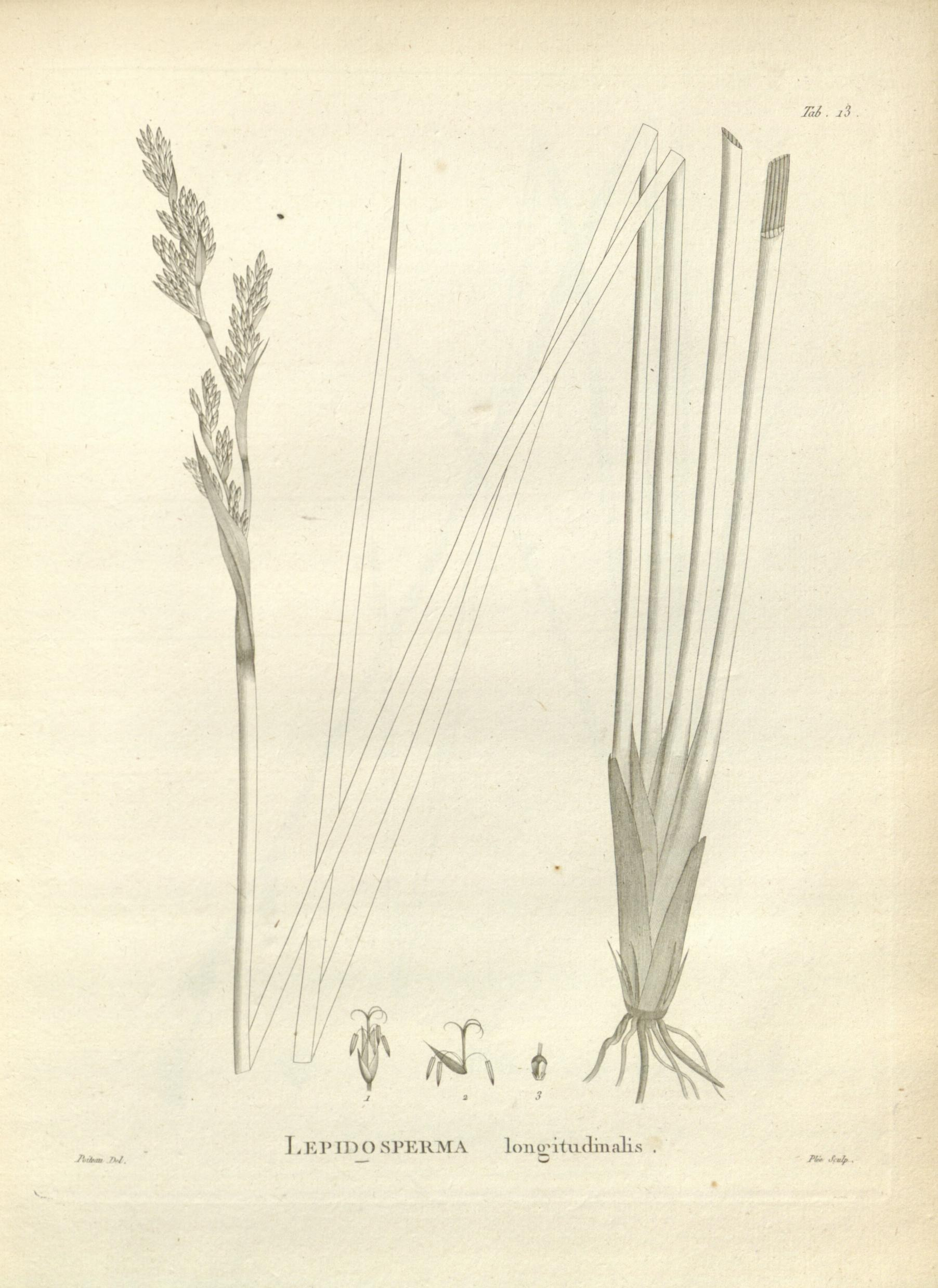

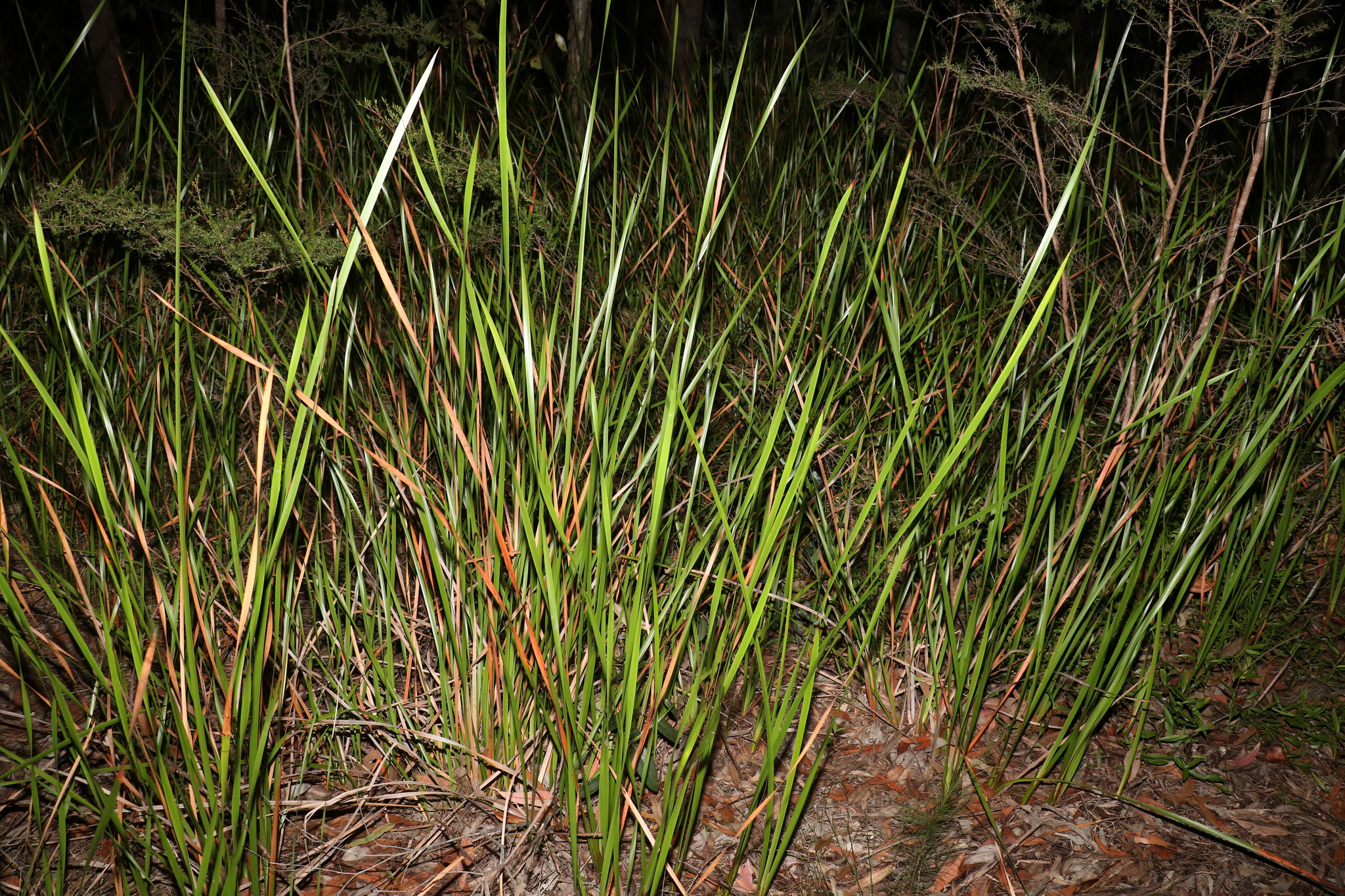

Scientific classification
- Kingdom: Plantae
- Clade: Tracheophytes
- Clade: Angiosperms
- Clade: Monocots
- Clade: Commelinids
- Order: Poales
- Family: Cyperaceae
- Genus: Lepidosperma
- Species: L. longitudinale

Binomial name
- Lepidosperma longitudinale Labill.
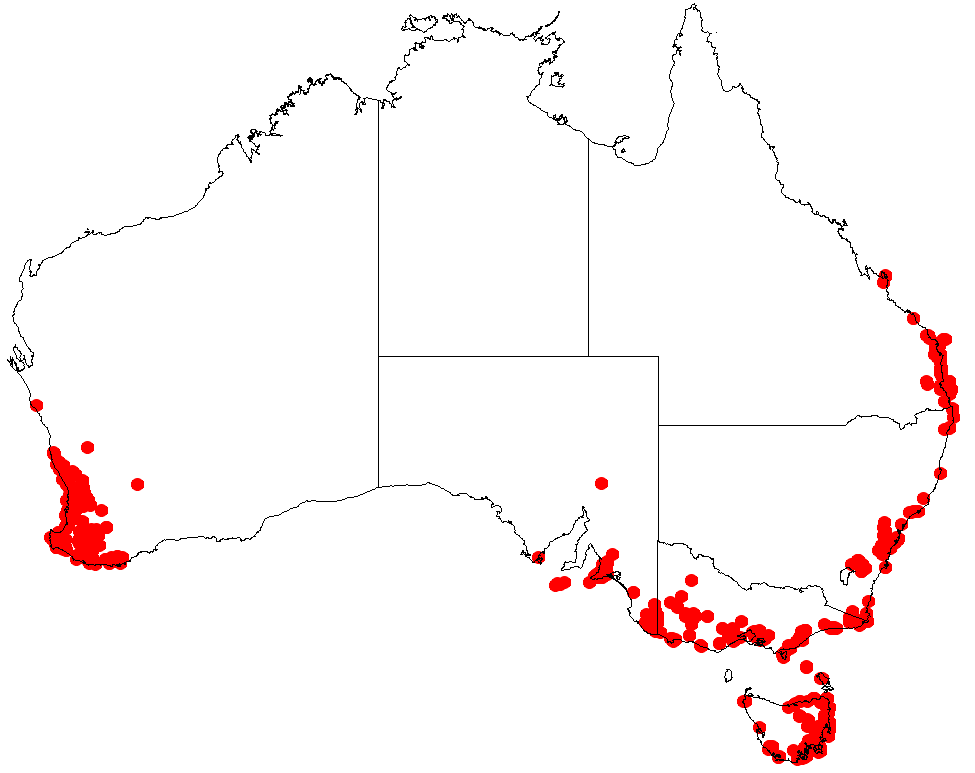
- Occurrence data from AVH

= Lepidosperma longitudinale =

Pithy sword-sedge

Species of plant

Lepidosperma longitudinale is commonly known as the pithy sword-sedge or pith saw-sedge. It is an evergreen species of sedge that is native to swampy areas of most Australian states. It was described by French botanist Jacques Labillardière in 1805.

L longitudinale is a clump forming perennial that has a short thick rhizome that can grow to a height of 0.5 metres (2 ft) to 2 metres (7 ft). The culms are erect, biconvex, glabrous, smooth with a width of between 5 millimetres (0.20 in) and 10 millimetres (0.39 in), they are also quite sharp on the edges. The leaves are yellow to red at the base and have a dark and pointed tip

Flowering occurs between the months of May to October. The inflorescences of L longitudinale are brown in color and occur at the top of the stems. Each stem is topped with spikelets that are 5 to 7 mm in length and each contain 2-3 small flowers. This sedge forms fruits in the form of an almost oval brown nut that is 2 mm wide and 3 – 4 mm in length.

The preferred habitat of L longitudinale is freshwater areas such as swamps, lake edges, floodways, creekbanks and seeps. The plant tends to spread with its creeping rhizomes to form new stems to form dense monoculture colonies.

== Ecology ==
L. longitudinale occupies a hygrophilous ecological niche along with other Lepidosperma species; L.australe, L. effusum, L. gladiatum, L. quadrangulatum, L. striatum and L. tetraquetrum.

It has numerous ecological associations including the Tasmanian bettong who use it as a protective habitat, the Noisy scrub-bird, Southern emu-wren and the Red-winged fairy-wren who makes nests from the leaves. The plant acts as a host for the moths Elachista faberella, Elachista lachnella and Elachista spathacea .

The living stands of L. longitudinale in combination with leaf litter supports microbial activity that can capture excess phosphorus from run-off and incorporate the nutrient into wetland sediments.
