= Lake Vancouver (Western Australia) =

Lake in Western Australia

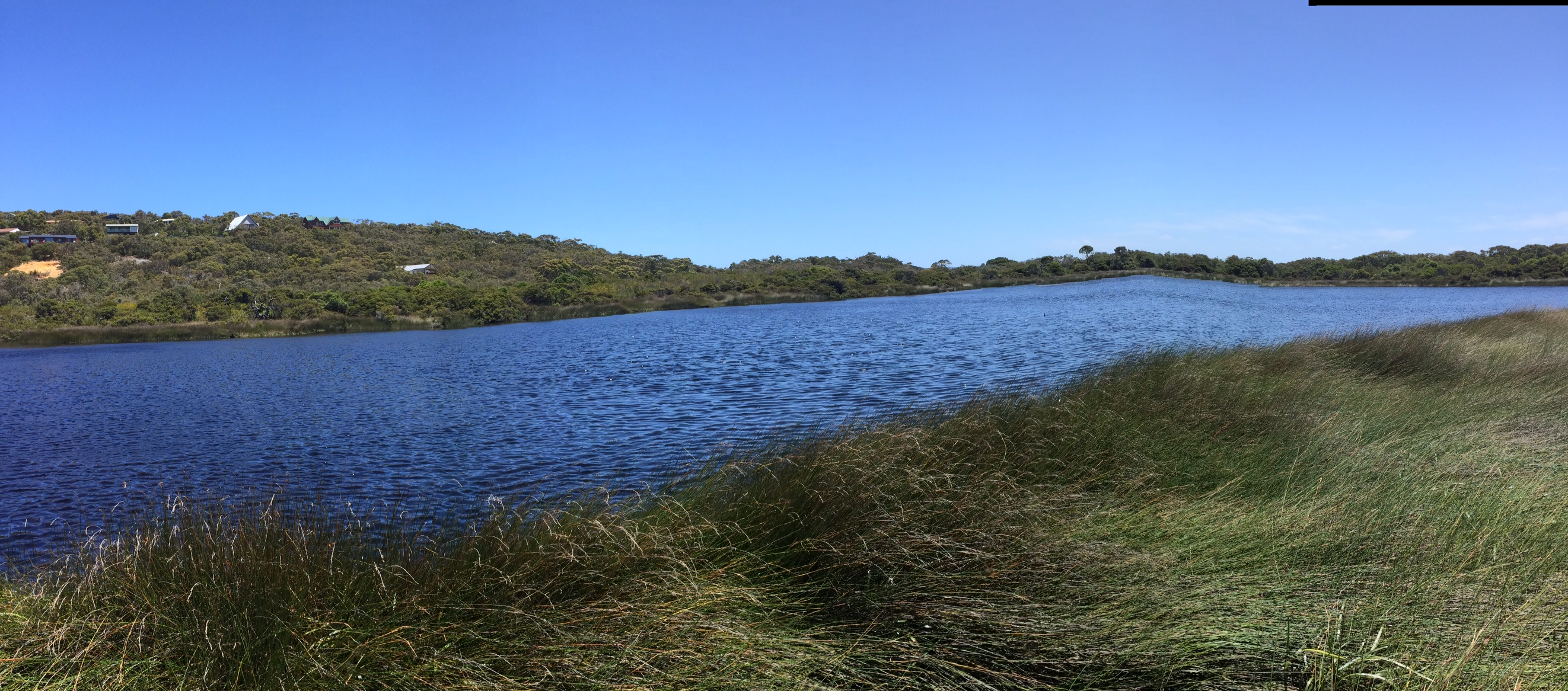
- Lake Vancouver December 2018

- Location in Western Australia
- Interactive map of Lake Vancouver
- Location: Great Southern, Western Australia
- Coordinates: 35°05′04″S 117°56′03″E
- Type: Marginal Fresh water to Brackish water
- Primary inflows: Ground water and surface flow
- Catchment area: 0.5 km^{2} (0.19 sq mi)
- Basin countries: Australia
- Max. length: 210 m (690 ft)
- Max. width: 125 m (410 ft)
- Surface area: 19,900 m^{2} (214,000 sq ft)
- Shore length^{1}: 620 m (2,030 ft)
- Surface elevation: 5 m (16 ft)
- Islands: none
- ^{1} Shore length is not a well-defined measure.

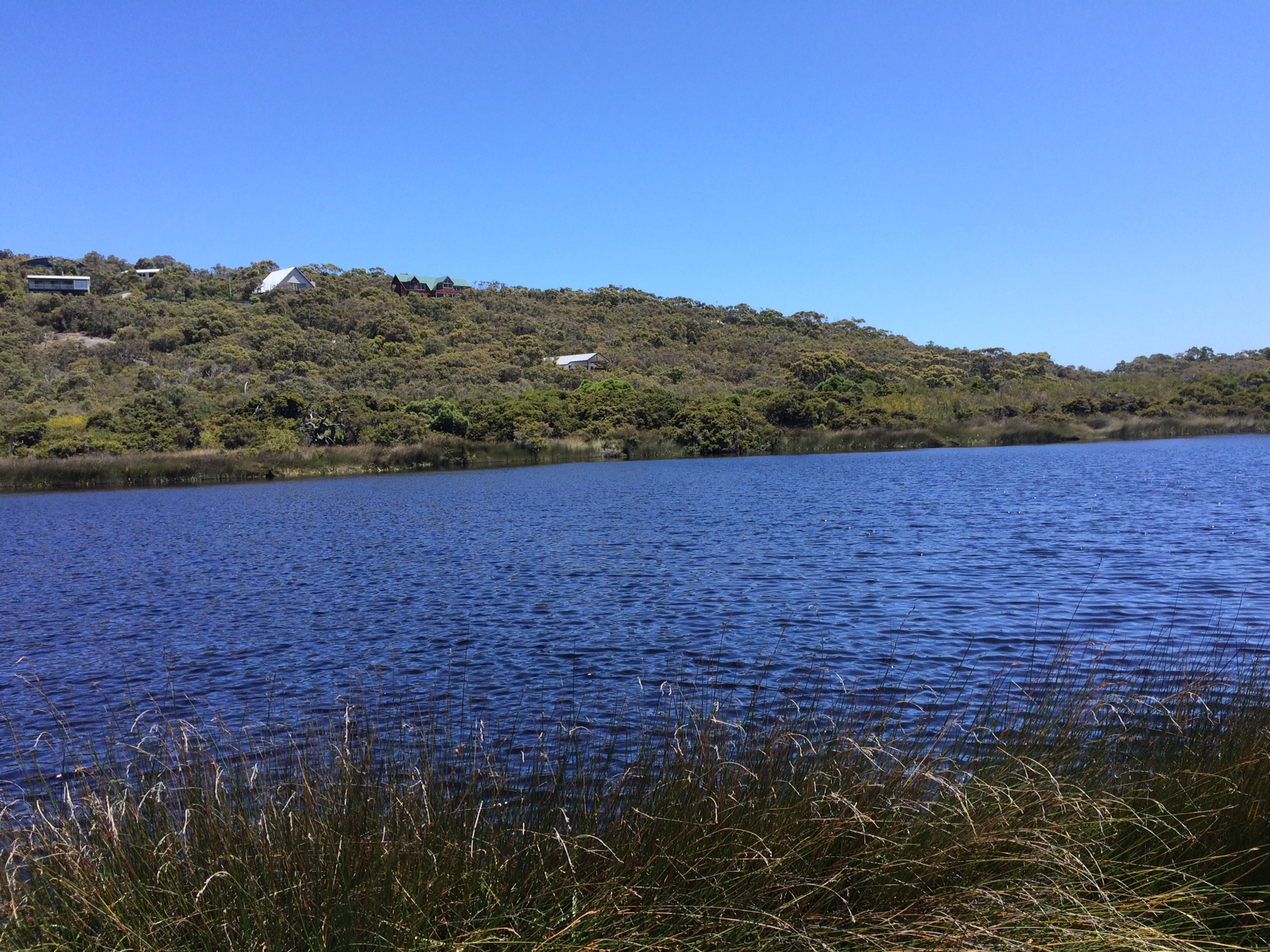
Lake Vancouver eastern side

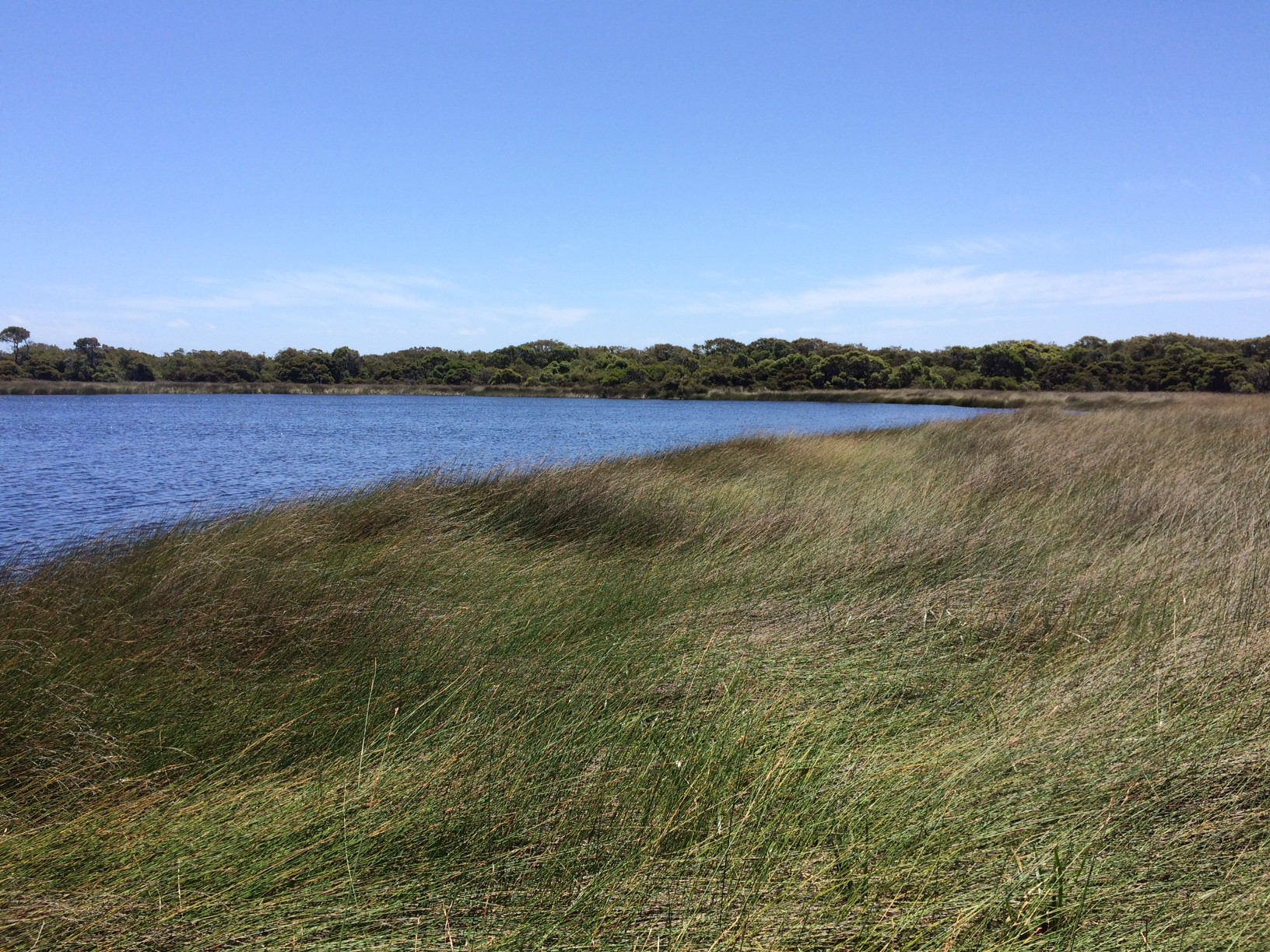
Lake Vancouver northern side

Lake Vancouver (Noongar: Naaranyirrap) is a permanent freshwater lake in the Great Southern region of Western Australia located approximately 20 km (12 mi) south east of the town of Albany and about 438 km (272 mi) south east of Perth. The lake is listed in the South Coast significant Wetlands database and is part of a case study to help determine buffer zone guidelines for wetlands in Western Australia.

== Description ==
The lake is situated approximately 200 m (660 ft) west of Goode Beach and is the only source of fresh water on the Vancouver Peninsula. It sits at an elevation of approximately 5 m (16 ft), has an ill-defined coastal catchment area of approximately 0.5 km^{2} (0.19 sq mi) and receives an annual rainfall of around 950 mm (37 in). Approximately one third of catchment area has been cleared.

It is situated on the edge of granite bedrock within tertiary sediments, and was formed as a result of migration of fine clay and silt particles as well as land subsidence. The lake and wetlands receive fresh water from surface flow off the surrounding area, and groundwater through sub-surface flows. The wetlands also helps to recharge the groundwater.

The water has low salinity, typically between 1.4 and 2.8 mS/cm, so it is classified as marginal to brackish.

The wetland has been classified as pristine and is a significant source of water for fauna in the area. It is surrounded by privately owned property. The excellent condition of the lake is due to the surrounding buffer zone of thick, natural vegetation and the connection of the lake to shallow, fresh groundwater. The water quality is good, with low levels of nitrogen and phosphorus but is not classed as potable. The water levels change seasonally and are dependent on rainfall, surface runoff, and groundwater levels. The shallow lens of fresh water sits above a salt water layer.

=== Flora ===
The dense fringing vegetation around the lake extends for 10 to 40 m (33 to 131 ft) from the edge of the lake. The over-storey consists mostly of swamp favouring species Banksia littoralis, paperbark Melaleuca cuticularis, wonnich Callistachys lanceolata and the common peppermint tree Agonis flexuosa. The woolly bush Adenanthos sericeus make up the bulk of the mid storey with an understorey consisting mostly of sedges Lepidosperma gladiatum or Lepidosperma effusum and rushes Baumea juncea. Banksia sessilis (budjan) is also found around the site. A consultant had erroneously reported it as absent; Hopper suggested this may have been due to a 1992 record of the species as Dryandra sessilis.

=== Fauna ===
The fresh water lake with low nutrient levels has low algae levels and does not support a large population of waterbirds. The usual inhabitants as musk ducks, with other species flying in on occasion. The lake supports 15 groups of macroinvertebrates, including Copepoda, Ostracoda, Decapoda, Oligochaeta, Gastropoda, Conchostraca, Corixidae and Chironomidae.

== History ==
The traditional owners of the area are the Mineng group of the Noongar peoples, who know the lake as Naaranyirrap, meaning 'when you cup the water in your hands and you drink it' in reference to the purity of the water. The Noongar have inhabited the area for around 70,000 years and believe that the site is where the Wagyl comes up for air while creating the tunnels below that the water runs through.

Both the lake and the peninsula on which it is located are named to honour George Vancouver, who landed nearby at Point Possession in 1791 and drank from the spring that feeds the lake.

In 2011 the Frenchman Bay Association received funding to construct pathways, boardwalks, interpretative signage and a bird hide for observers. Once the work was completed, the public were allowed access it in 2012.

Plans for luxury accommodation near the lake, with 10 two-storey buildings with a total of 51 units and 61 beds, car parking areas and recreation facilities including a function centre, café and dining areas occupying a total area of 7.7 ha (19 acres) were released in 2017. The plan was approved in July 2018 and was endorsed by the City council despite almost 270 objections being lodged. One of the objections to the development is the lack of a current survey of flora and fauna at the site. Endangered species including Carnaby's black cockatoo (Calyptorhynchus latirostris), the western subspecies of ringtail possum ngwayir, and a pygmy sundew have been observed at the site by resident botanist Stephen Hopper.

== See also ==
- List of lakes of Australia § Western Australia
