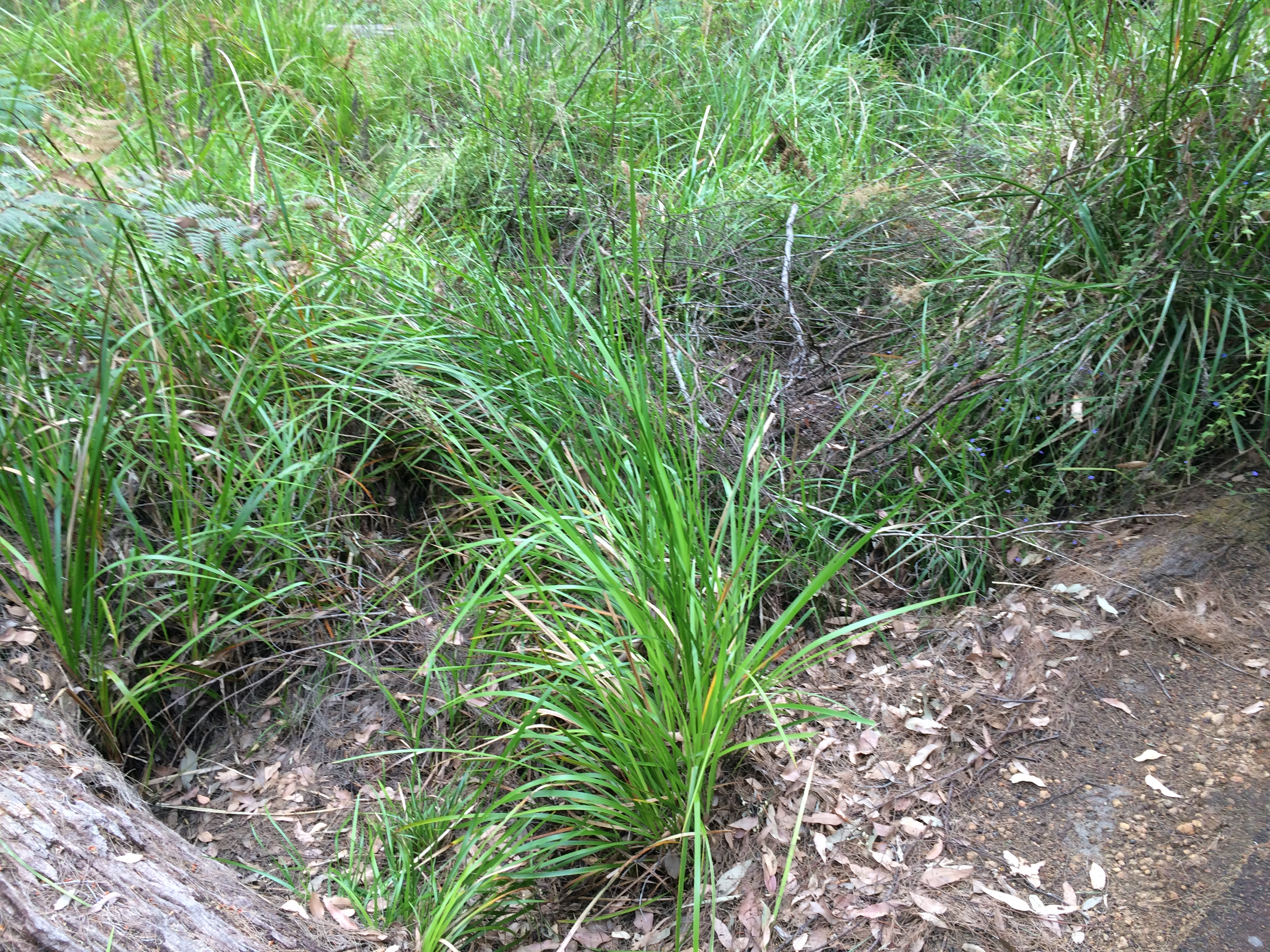
- Lepidosperma effusum in Walpole-Nornalup National Park

Scientific classification
- Kingdom: Plantae
- Clade: Tracheophytes
- Clade: Angiosperms
- Clade: Monocots
- Clade: Commelinids
- Order: Poales
- Family: Cyperaceae
- Genus: Lepidosperma
- Species: L. effusum

Binomial name
- Lepidosperma effusum Benth.
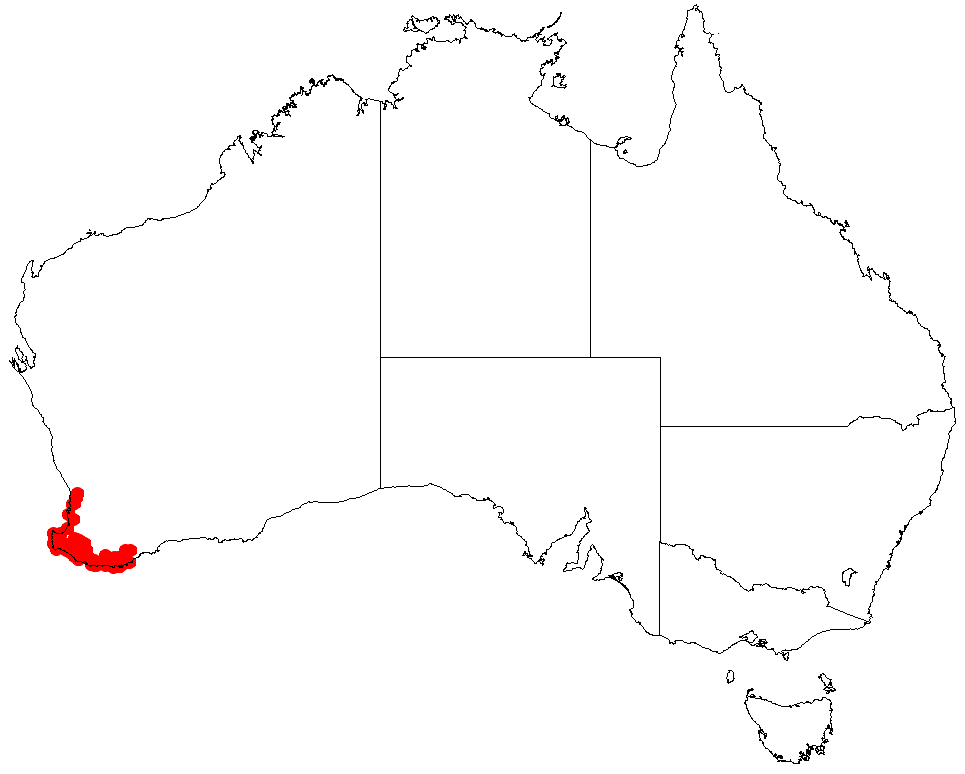
- Occurrence data from AVH

= Lepidosperma effusum =

Species of grass-like plant

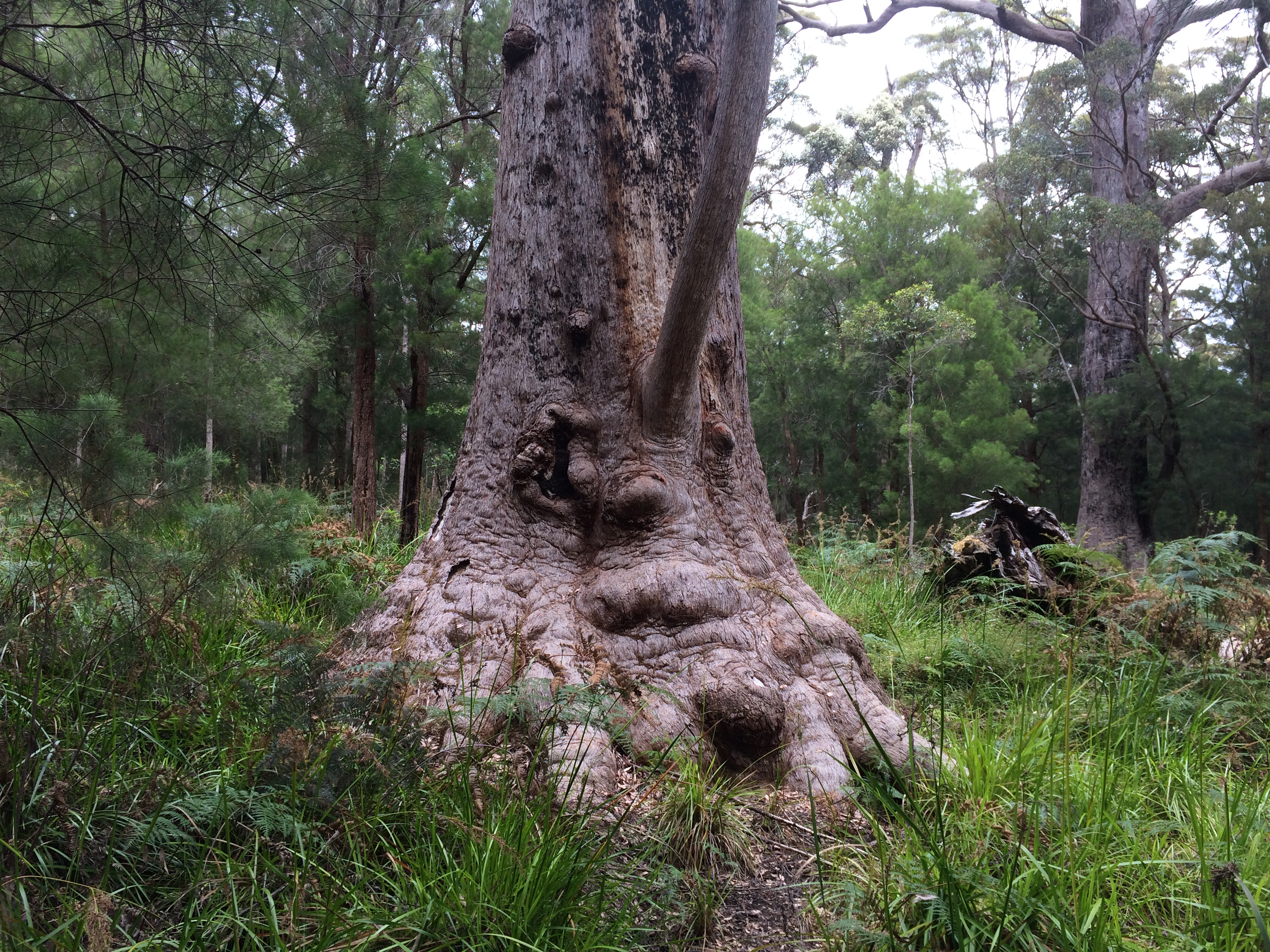
Eucalyptus jacksonii tree with Leptidosperma effusum understorey in Walpole-Nornalup National Park

Lepidosperma effusum, commonly known as the riverside sword sedge or spreading sword sedge, is an evergreen species of sedge that is native to southwest Western Australia.

== Description ==
The sedge has a robust and tufted habit typically growing in clumps to a height of 2.5 metres (8 ft) and a width of 2 metres (7 ft). It is rhizomatous and confined to damp areas. It flowers between April and November producing brown coloured flowers.

== Taxonomy ==
The species was first formally described by English botanist George Bentham in his Flora Australiensis in 1878.

== Distribution ==
It occurs along the edges of creeks and streams and around swamps from the Perth region south through the Margaret River region and eastwards to Albany where it grows in sandy or loamy soils.

== Ecology ==
L. effusum occupies a hygrophilous ecological niche along with other Lepidosperma species; L.australe, L. longitudinale, L. gladiatum, L. quadrangulatum, L. striatum and L. tetraquetrum.

It has numerous ecological associations including Quokkas who use it as a protective habitat, the Noisy scrub-bird, Australasian bittern and the Red-winged fairy-wren who makes nests from the leaves. Amphibians such as the Nornalup frog (Geocrinia lutea) and Karri frog (Geocrinia rosea) can be heard calling from stands of the sedge. The plant acts as a host for the moths Elachista flavicilia, Elachista effusi and Elachista strictifica. The rare Main's assassin spider Zephyrarchaea mainae is restricted to litter lodged in the crown of L. gladiatum and L. effusum.

== Cultivation ==
Lepidosperma effusum is sold commercially and can be grown in a full or part sun position and will tolerate a light frost. It can be grown in large ceramic pots.

== Uses ==
Like many sedges, it is important to improve water quality it wetlands. The shallow spreading surface roots bind soil and prevent erosion. They form dense stands along foreshores or around wetlands that trap soil and water run-off, which in turn limits the transfer of nutrients into waterbodies. They can accumulate significant amounts of nutrients in stems and rhizomes, and supporting bacterial transformation of nutrients and other pollutants on their extensive root and rhizome mass. This species grows in areas with fresh or brackish water.
