= Little bettong =

Conservation status
- Extinct (Unknown, possibly c. 1960) (IUCN 3.1)

Scientific classification
- Kingdom: Animalia
- Phylum: Chordata
- Class: Mammalia
- Infraclass: Marsupialia
- Order: Diprotodontia
- Family: Potoroidae
- Genus: Bettongia
- Species: †B. haoucharae

Binomial name
- †Bettongia haoucharae Newman-Martin, Travouillon, & Warburton, 2025

Extinct species of marsupial

The little bettong (Bettongia haoucharae) is an extinct potoroid marsupial from southern and central Australia. The species is only known from subfossil and mummified remains found throughout the Nullarbor Plain's and Great Victoria Desert. Specific epithet "haoucharae" is to honour Dalal Haouchar, whose work on bettongs revealed genetic differences in samples taken from Nullarbor subfossils.

== Extinction ==
It is unknown what caused the extinction of the little bettong, but based on the timing of its extinction and the decline of similar potoroid species, it is believed to be predation by cats and foxes. The species has never been collected alive by western science, but was known by Aboriginal peoples to have occurred in central Australia until 1960, however these reports could also represent the desert bettong (Bettongia anhydra). The last reports of the little bettong by residents on the Nullarbor occurred during the late 1930s.
