= Nullarbor dwarf bettong =

Conservation status
- Extinct (IUCN 3.1)

Scientific classification
- Kingdom: Animalia
- Phylum: Chordata
- Class: Mammalia
- Infraclass: Marsupialia
- Order: Diprotodontia
- Family: Potoroidae
- Genus: Bettongia
- Species: †B. pusilla

Binomial name
- †Bettongia pusilla McNamara, 1997

Extinct species of marsupial

The Nullarbor dwarf bettong, Bettongia pusilla, was a potoroine marsupial that occurred in Australia. The animal is only known from skeletons found in caves of the Nullarbor Plain and is now classified as recently extinct.

== Taxonomy ==
The Nullarbor dwarf bettong was a species of Bettongia, a genus that includes still living species such as the northern bettong, belonging to the subfamily Potoroinae. The description was first published in 1997 by R. A. McNamara, using specimens collected on the Nullarbor Plain from the Koonalda and Weekes Caves. The holotype is part of a juvenile's right jaw, with some teeth absent, obtained at the Koonalda site. The author recognised an earlier description, misidentified as Caloprymnus campestris by Ernest Lundelius and William D. Turnbull in 1984, and the informal reference to a potoroid species. McNamara's paper on the new species details his diagnosis as arising independently, but gives credit for the discovery to earlier worker's identification of the taxon as 'Thomson's unnamed Potoroid' or 'Unnamed potoroid'.

The epithet pusilla is derived from Latin, a reference to the small size of the animal. The English vernacular Nullarbor dwarf bettong was suggested by McNamara and is used to refer to this species.

== Description ==
Betongia pusilla show a form of dentition and jaw structure that distinguishes them from others of the genus. The mandible is lighter than the extant species, and the teeth are smaller. Molars of Bettongia pusilla are straight sided with an elevated crown, which contrasts with the bulbous shape of other Bettongia species.

== Distribution and habitat ==
Only known from a series of skeletal remains found in caves on the Nullarbor Plain, an arid desert region of southern Australia. The species is assumed to have become extinct in the states of Western and South Australia during the period of colonisation.
