= Protected areas of Australian Capital Territory =

The Australian Capital Territory as of 2014 contains 46 separate protected areas with a total land area of 1,302 km^{2} (503 sq mi) or 55.5% of the territory's area, and which managed by Territory and Municipal Services of the ACT government:

== Protected areas of the Australian Capital Territory ==
=== Botanic gardens ===
- Australian National Botanic Gardens

=== National parks ===
- Namadgi National Park

=== Nature Reserves ===
As of 2020, a total of 47 nature reserves are listed as part of the National Reserve System with a total area of 249.80 square kilometres (96.45 square miles). As of 2015, 33 of these nature reserves have been grouped together under the name Canberra Nature Park.

- Aranda Bushland
- Black Mountain
- Bruce Ridge
- Bullen Range
- Callum Brae
- Cooleman Ridge
- Crace
- Dunlop Grassland
- Farrer Ridge
- Gigerline
- Goorooyarroo
- Gossan Hill
- Gungaderra Grassland
- Isaacs Ridge
- Jarramlee Grassland Reserve
- Jerrabomberra Wetlands
- Justice Robert Hope Park
- Kinleyside
- Kowen Escarpment
- McQuoids Hill
- Melrose
- Molonglo Gorge
- Molonglo River
- Mount Ainslie
- Mount Majura
- Mount Mugga Mugga
- Mount Painter
- Mount Pleasant
- Mount Taylor
- Mulanggari Grassland
- Mulligans Flat Woodland Sanctuary
- O'Connor Ridge
- Oakey Hill
- Old Naas TSR
- Percival Hill
- Red Hill
- Rob Roy
- Stony Creek
- Swamp Creek
- The Pinnacle
- Tidbinbilla
- Tuggeranong Hill
- unnamed
- Urambi Hills
- Wanniassa Hills
- West Jerrabomberra
- Woodstock

=== Wilderness zone ===
- Bimberi

== See also ==
- Protected areas of Australia
- Australian Alps National Parks and Reserves
