= Mulligans Flat Woodland Sanctuary =

Nature reserve in the Australian Capital Territory

Mulligans Flat
- IUCN category IV (habitat/species management area)
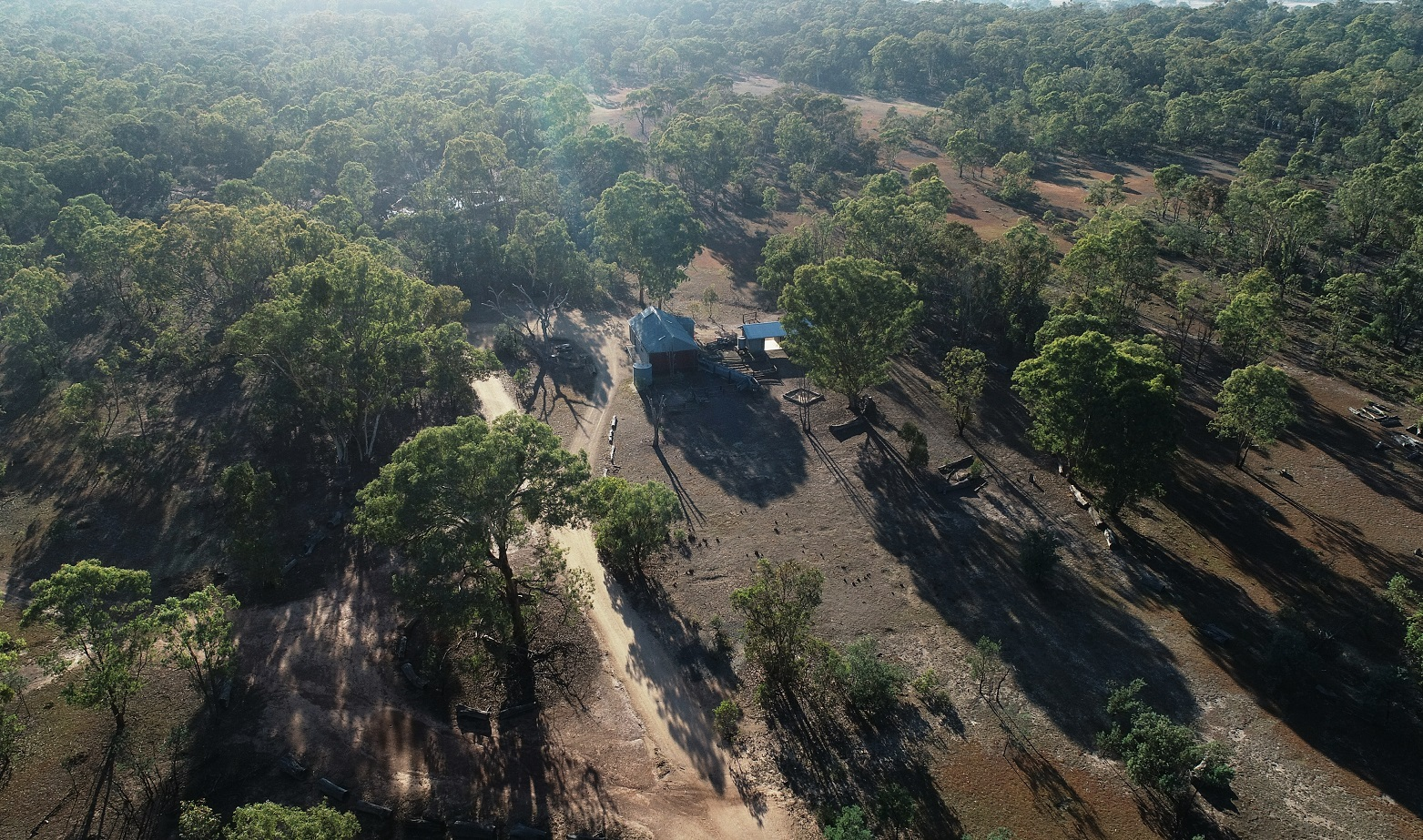
- Drone capture of Mulligans Flat by Alex Humphreys

- Location within Australian Capital Territory
- Location: Australian Capital Territory
- Coordinates: 35°10′S 149°10′E
- Area: 12.53 km^{2} (4.84 sq mi)
- Established: 1994
- Governing body: Woodlands and Wetlands Trust, ACT Government
- Website: Official website

Mulligans Flat Woodland Sanctuary (previously Mulligans Flat Nature Reserve) is a protected area situated in the Gungahlin district in north Canberra in the Australian Capital Territory. It has several trails for walking, running and cycling. The sanctuary functions as a fieldwork site for researchers studying native ecology.

== Geography ==
The area consists of woodland, open grassland and a large dam surrounded by a fox-proof fence. Despite being freehold and then leasehold grazing land prior to becoming a reserve, Mulligans Flat has been subjected to less overall farming pressure than other areas at similar proximity to human activity.

As a result, the uniquely intact habitat was given protected status as crucial habitat for threatened wildlife including the golden sun moth, the striped legless lizard and numerous other plant and animal species.

Approximately 150 species of wild flowers are found in the sanctuary under stands of six different species of gum tree, including threatened Blakely's red gum (Eucalyptus blakelyi) and yellow box (Eucalyptus melliodora), which are valuable nest trees for the vulnerable superb parrot.

Mulligans Flat is a sister sanctuary of Zealandia Wildlife Sanctuary. Its chief managing authority is the ACT Government with support from the Woodlands and Wetlands Trust with parallel arrangements for the Jerrabomberra Wetlands.

== History ==
=== Aboriginal heritage ===
Mulligans Flat is situated on Ngunnawal land. There has been disagreement in the past over traditional ownership in the Canberra region, including the tablelands where Mulligans Flat is located.

Old Coach Road, situated in the valley where Mulligans Flat meets Goorooyarroo, is the site of a Ngunnawal songline. Stone artefacts and tree scarring have been found throughout the reserve and nearby Throsby Offsets.

Prior to the heavy clearing and farming practices of the nineteenth century, the area had a permanent water supply which is thought to have existed in the form of ponds connected by inconsistent channels. This landscape would have provided food and other resources in the form of a diverse biome of flora and fauna sufficient to support a local community. A volcanic ridge exists along the east of the sanctuary, and to the west, a geological fault line caused a quartz ridge to develop which can be observed via satellite imagery. These quarry sites provided materials for making tools which were used and traded by locals and travellers.

Some contemporary methods used by Aboriginal peoples in caring for country on Mulligans Flat include land management, advocacy and working with groups such as the ACT Parks and Conservation Service's Aboriginal Ranger Program.

The Traditional Owners Aboriginal Corporation occasionally runs educational sessions using Mulligans Flat as a teaching location. A welcome to country is included in a self-guided walking tour app.

=== Sanctuary history ===
In 1992, seven environmental groups submitted a proposal to the Minister for the Environment for a nature reserve to protect Mulligans Flat from urban development. The area had already been observed as providing habitat for threatened plant and animal species, including six out of seven rare woodland bird species recorded by the community-based Canberra Ornithologist's Group. Mulligans Flat Nature Reserve was subsequently established as part of the Canberra Nature Park in 1994. Protection was extended to include Goorooyarroo Nature Reserve following its establishment in 2004, and to the Throsby Offsets in 2014. Further community participation was encouraged through the establishing of the Friends of Mulligans Flat in 2011, which allows members to take part in ongoing conservation activities such as weed control.

The Mulligans Flat-Goorooyarroo Woodland Experiment was established through a partnership between the ACT Government, CSIRO, and the Australian National University (ANU). Ongoing collaboration between these and the sanctuary's management board has enabled restoration projects to take place. Some examples are the reintroduction of several species, habitat recovery, and the monitoring of impacts of a range of management practices.

== Conservation ==
The sanctuary is described in promotional material as an "outdoor laboratory", and seeks to achieve ecosystem recovery and restoration through increasing species diversity and available habitat.

It is estimated that 30% remains of the site's original eucalyptus woodland. Despite this, Mulligans Flat and Goorooyarroo together provide the country's largest remaining contiguous area of white box-yellow box-Blakely's red gum grassy woodland and derived native grassland, which is listed as critically endangered under the Commonwealth Environment Protection and Biodiversity Conservation Act 1999 and as endangered in the New South Wales Threatened Species Conservation Act 1990.

In 2011, Mulligans Flat received classification as an IUCN Category IV protected area.

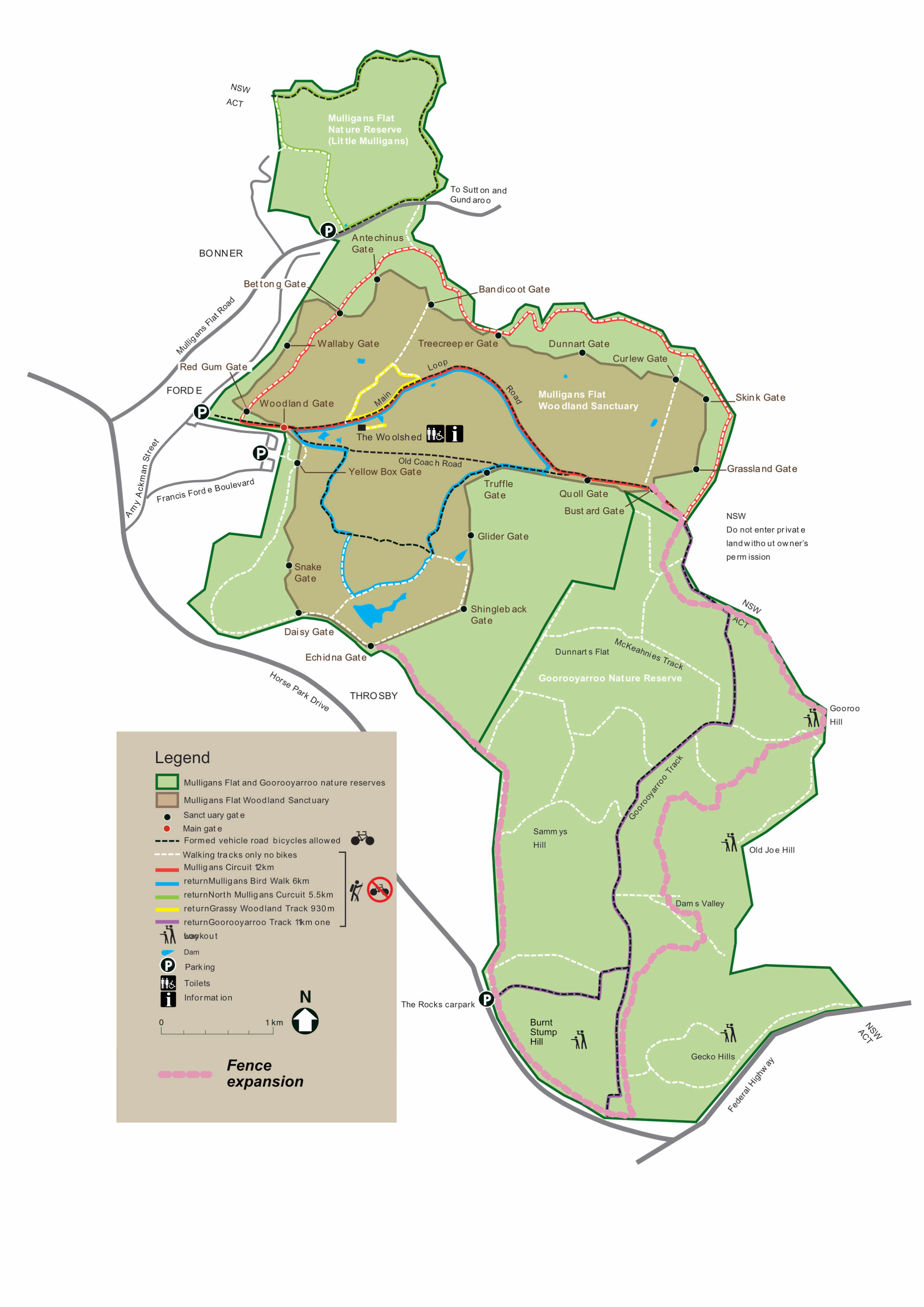
Mulligans Flat Nature Reserve

=== Predator-proof fence ===
Construction began in 2008 and was completed in 2009 on an 11.5 kilometre fox-proof fence to protect 485 hectares. This was followed by the removal of introduced competitors and predators including rabbits, cats and red foxes, in preparation for reintroducing native species. Mulligans Flat was the first Australian woodland reserve to successfully eradicate foxes, cats and then rabbits.

In 2018, the fence was expanded and the protected area nearly tripled to 1253 hectares.

Other fences assisting with species management include the kangaroo and bettong exclosures, which provide information to researchers studying restoration processes in the sanctuary.

=== Reintroduced species ===
Reintroductions at Mulligans Flat have taken place primarily through partnership with the ANU Fenner School.

The first species to be successfully reintroduced in Mulligans Flat was the eastern bettong (bettongia giamardi) in 2012. Thirty-five individuals were released into the sanctuary following the translocation of Tasmanian bettongs into nearby Tidbinbilla Nature Reserve. This species had been locally extinct on the Australian mainland for 80 years, and its return allowed researchers from the ANU Fenner School of Environment and Society, who led the project, to study the results of re-establishing an ecosystem engineer in an environment concurrent with other restoration practices. This research resulted in a transformational paper in reintroduction biology on "translocation tactics", which informed all subsequent reintroductions.

Bush-stone curlews (burhinus grallarius) were reintroduced in 2014 after being absent from the ACT for 40 years. Twelve individuals were placed in a soft-release aviary within Mulligans Flat before being released into the wider sanctuary. This initial release faced some setbacks as several of the birds flew over the fence and were predated by foxes. Over the following two years, 21 more individuals were released using a similar soft-release method, although their flight feathers were clipped before being allowed out of the aviary. As a result, the birds had more time to adjust to their surroundings, and by the time their flight feathers grew back in they had settled in to Mulligans Flat as their permanent home.

In 2016, eastern quolls (dasyurus viverrinus), another locally extinct species, were reintroduced to Mulligans Flat. Half of the 16 individuals were sourced from Tasmania and the other half from a captive breeding program in Mt Rothwell, Victoria. This initial reintroduction was successful despite several individuals climbing over the fox-proof fence and being promptly eaten by foxes. The remaining female quoll population all produced pouch young, resulting in as estimated 25 to 30 additions to the population. This marked the first breeding of the species in Canberra in an estimated 80 years.

A second translocation was carried out in 2017 and had a higher rate of survival at 92%. These individuals settled immediately into their new territory. They benefited from other restoration processes taking place in the sanctuary, in particular the addition of wood debris which increased the invertebrate population, and by extension the quoll's food source. The presence of quolls from the previous translocation was considered a contributing factor in the lower number of attempted escapes, as the area was proven suitable habitat.

Other species that have re-introduced or re-established within Mulligans Flat include the New Holland mouse and the vulnerable brown treecreeper. The New Holland mouse, like the eastern bettong, was locally extinct and has a captive bred population at ANU.

== See also ==
- List of Australian Capital Territory protected areas
