= Australian National Botanic Gardens =

Botanical garden in Acton, Canberra

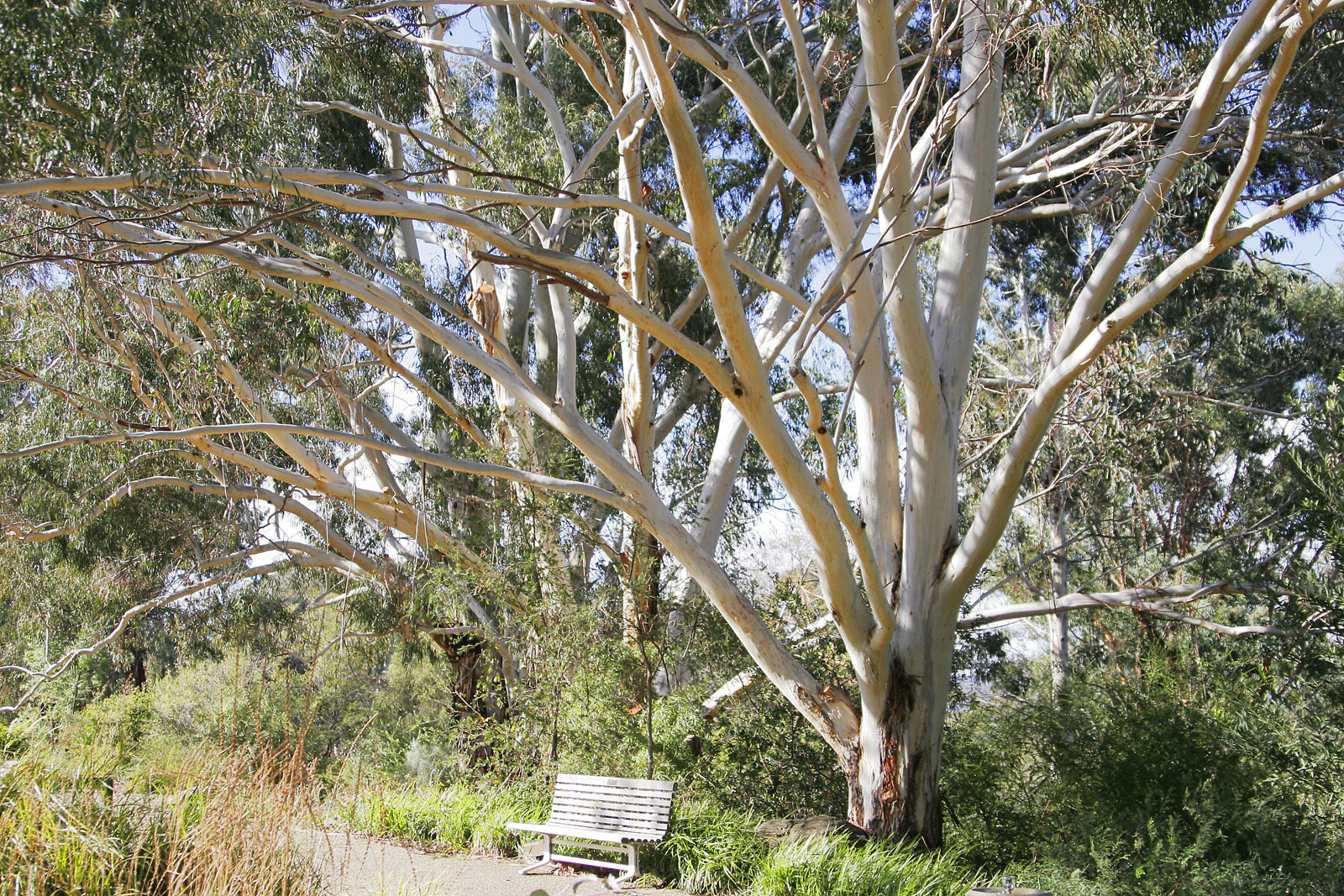
- Trees at the National Botanic Gardens
- Interactive map of Australian National Botanic Gardens
- Type: Botanical garden
- Motto: study and promote Australia's flora
- Location: Canberra, Australian Capital Territory, Australia
- Coordinates: 35°16′44″S 149°06′33″E
- Area: 90 hectares (220 acres)
- Established: September 1949; 76 years ago by Ben Chifley and Sir Edward Salisbury
- Opened: October 1970 by John Gorton
- Designer: Lindsay Pryor, Superintendent of Parks and Gardens in the Australian Capital Territory
- Owner: Commonwealth of Australia
- Operator: Director of National Parks
- Visitors: 450,480 (in 2010–11)
- Website: anbg.gov.au/gardens/index.html

Commonwealth Heritage List
- Official name: Australian National Botanic Gardens (part), Clunies Ross St, Acton, ACT, Australia
- Type: Listed place
- Criteria: B., C., E., F.
- Designated: 22 June 2004
- Reference no.: 105345

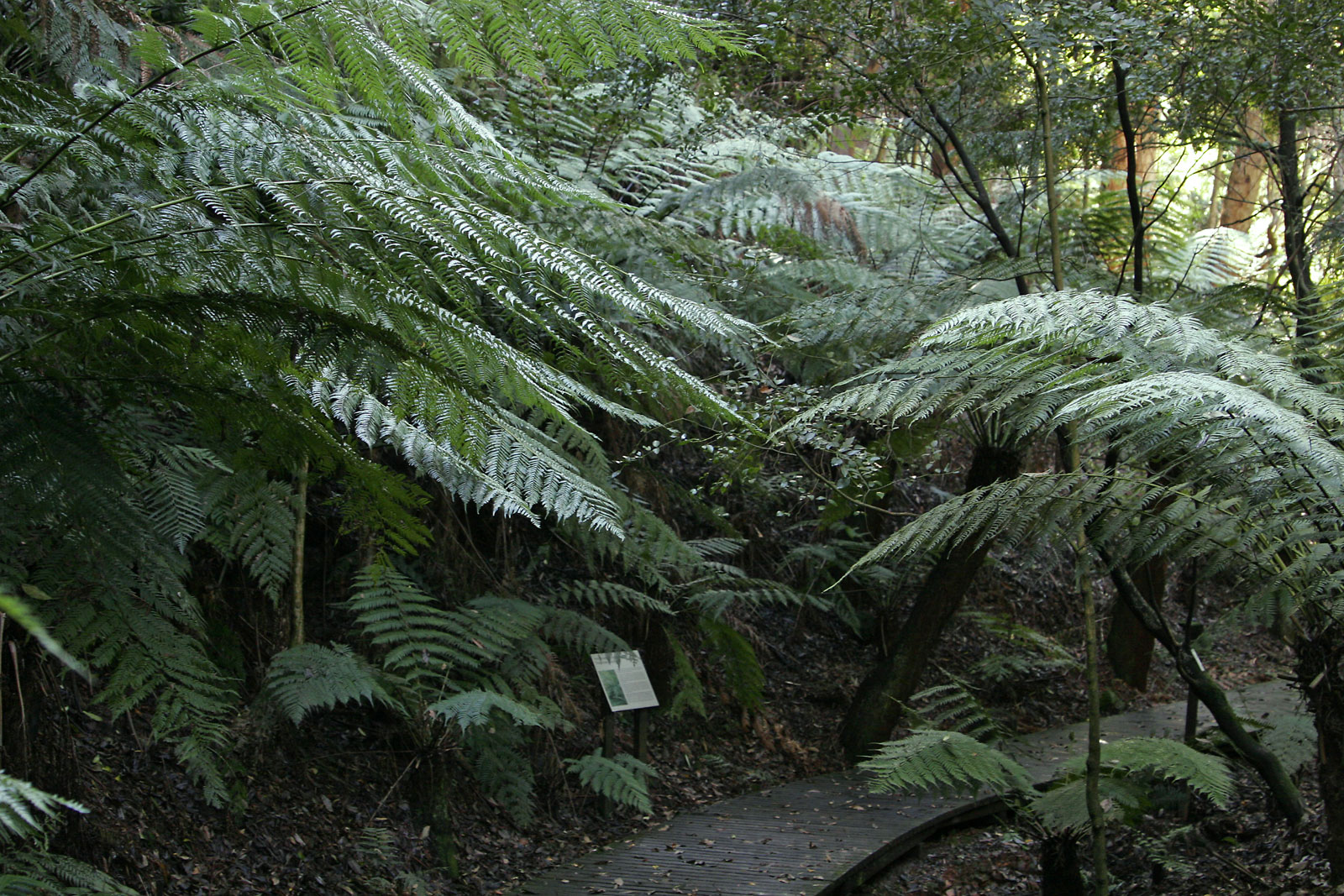
National Botanic Gardens Rainforest Tour

The Australian National Botanic Gardens (ANBG) is a heritage-listed botanical garden located in Acton, Canberra, in the Australian Capital Territory, Australia. Established in 1949, the Gardens is administered by the Australian Government's Department of Agriculture, Water and the Environment. The botanic gardens was added to the Commonwealth Heritage List on 22 June 2004.

The botanic gardens is the largest living collection of native Australian flora. The mission of the ANBG is to "study and promote Australia's flora". The gardens maintains a wide variety of botanical resources for researchers and cultivates native plants threatened in the wild. The herbarium code for the Australian National Botanic Gardens is CANB.

== History ==
When Canberra was being planned in the 1930s, the establishment of the gardens was recommended in a report in 1933 by the Australian Capital Territory Advisory Council. In 1935, The Dickson Report set forth a framework for their development. A large site for the gardens was set aside on Black Mountain. In September 1949, the ceremonial planting of the first trees by Prime Minister Ben Chifley and Sir Edward Salisbury, director of Kew Gardens, took place. Development of the site, facilities and collection progressed and the Gardens were officially opened in October 1970 by Prime Minister John Gorton.

To celebrate the Gardens' 50th anniversary in 2020, a new Banksia garden was added, showcasing a wide selection of the over-170 Banksia species spread across the coasts and hinterland of most of mainland Australia and Tasmania.

The Gardens has tenure over 90 hectares (220 acres) on Black Mountain. Approximately 40 hectares (99 acres) are currently developed as the Botanic Gardens. Plans for the development of the remaining land are on hold until funds are available.

== Collection ==
The gardens is organised in thematic sections; plants are grouped by shared taxonomy or are presented in ecological groupings that exist in nature. More than 5,500 species are cultivated. Displays include:

- Rainforest Gully, featuring plants for the rainforests of Eastern Australia
- Rock Garden, a display of plants which occur in habitats from the desert to alpine areas
- Sydney Region Flora, a display of the divers flora endemic to the sandstone formations of the Sydney basin
- Mallee Plants, the mallees is the name given to multi-stemmed eucalypts and the shrubs and grasses associated with them
- Banksias, waratahs and grevilleas (family Proteaceae)
- Callistemon, Leptospermum and Melaleuca (family Myrtaceae)
- The Eucalypt Lawn, features about one-fifth of Australian eucalypt species
- Wattles (genus Acacia)

== Physical description ==
The area is located on the north-eastern side of Black Mountain and consists of steep to gently sloping hillsides cut by several gullies. The setting is within dry sclerophyll woodland dominated by Eucalyptus rossii, E. mannifera ssp. maculosa and E. macrorhyncha. Soils in the area are predominantly red/yellow earths and red earth/red podsolic soils with associated lithosols and siliceous sands. The Gardens comprise sections devoted to different taxonomic plant groups and ecological themes focussed on Australian native plants. The site is crossed by a network of paths, providing access to the various garden beds. Areas of native bushland are still present on the site. One area on the upper slopes had been developed as a nature trail. Special features within the Gardens include the eucalypt lawn, rockery, rainforest gully, mallee shrubland, Hawkesbury sandstone and the Aboriginal trail. The rainforest area has been developed in what was previously a dry gully and has been planted to represent the eastern coast of Australia: Tasmanian species occupy the lower end of the gully and Victorian, New South Wales and Queensland species in sequence moving up the gully. The proposed conservatory at the upper end will allow the cultivation of tropical species. The Gardens are used as an education centre from primary to tertiary levels including horticultural and taxonomic training. They are also important for scientific research into the taxonomy, horticulture and biology of native plant species. The living collections are particularly important for this function. A large number of rare and endangered plant species are also included in the living collections, thus ensuring the preservation of their genotypes and allowing some protection through cultivation. Due to the mature vegetation and a wide range of habitats present in the area, over 100 native and exotic bird species have been recorded from the Gardens.

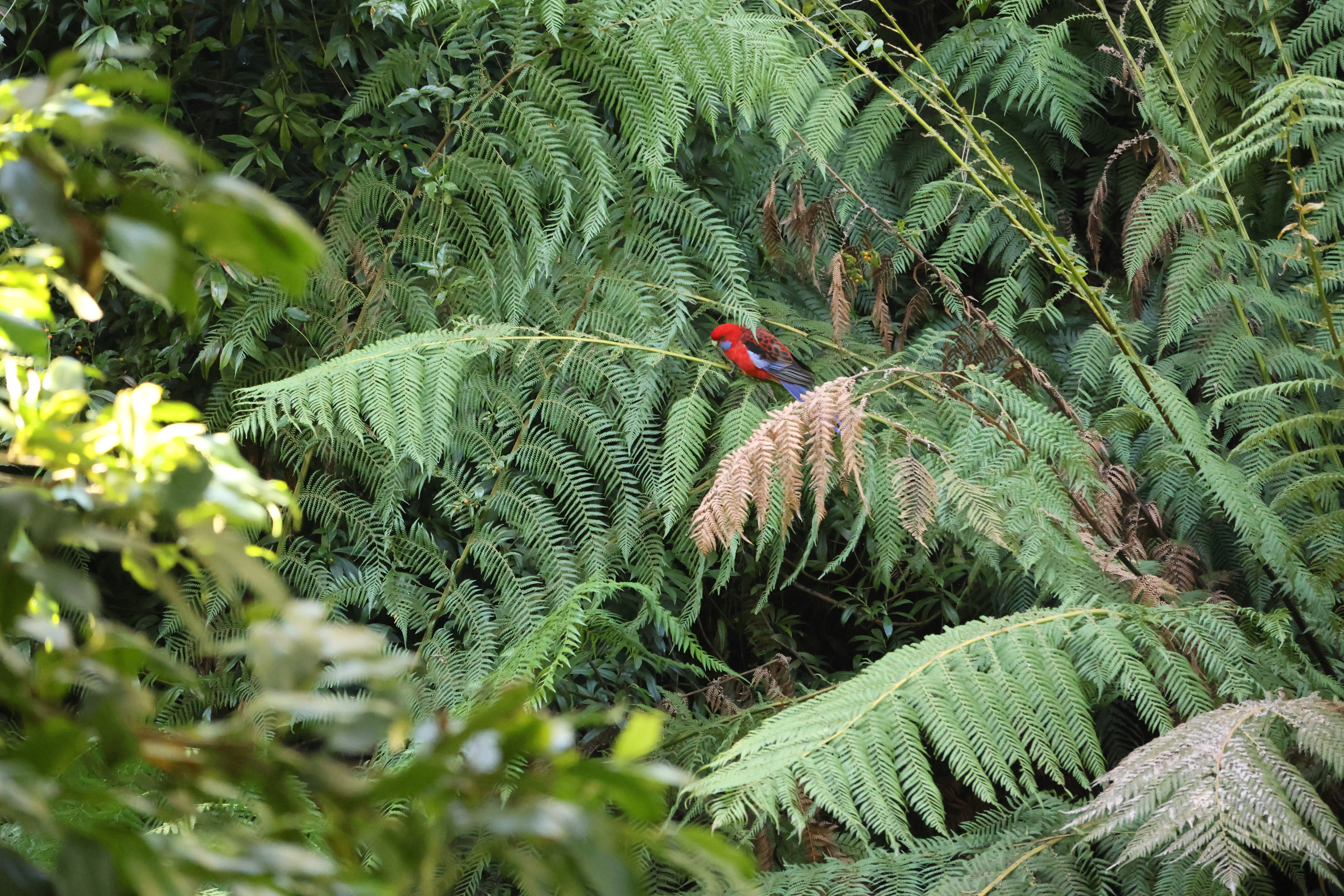
Crimson rosella (Platycercus elegans) at the Botanic Gardens

== Research ==
The Australian National Herbarium is held on site at the National Botanic Gardens. The Herbarium houses the third largest collection of pressed, dried plant specimens in Australia. The Herbarium is operated jointly with the Commonwealth Scientific and Industrial Research Organisation (CSIRO) as part of a joint research facility, the Centre for Plant Biodiversity Research. It is not open to the public. The Australian National Herbarium participates in the Australasian Virtual Herbarium(AVH), an online database of botanical information, including six million specimen records displaying geographic distribution, images, descriptive text and identification tools.

The Gardens manages several large plant databases, including "What's Its Name" (WIN), which is a point of access to the Australian Plant Name Index (APNI) listing all the scientific names ever used for Australia's plants. A large collection of images is also available.

The Gardens' library has significant collections of botanical books, journals, CD-ROMs and maps. The library is open to students and the public by appointment.

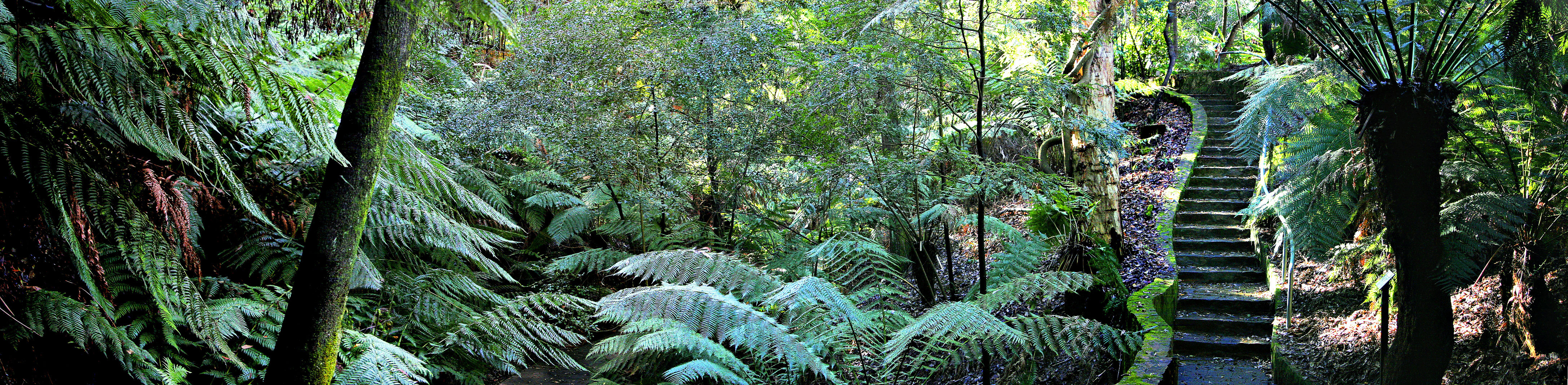
Rainforest walk at the National Botanic Gardens

== See also ==
- List of botanical gardens in Australia
- List of Australian Capital Territory protected areas
- Protected areas managed by the Australian government
- Judith Gay West
