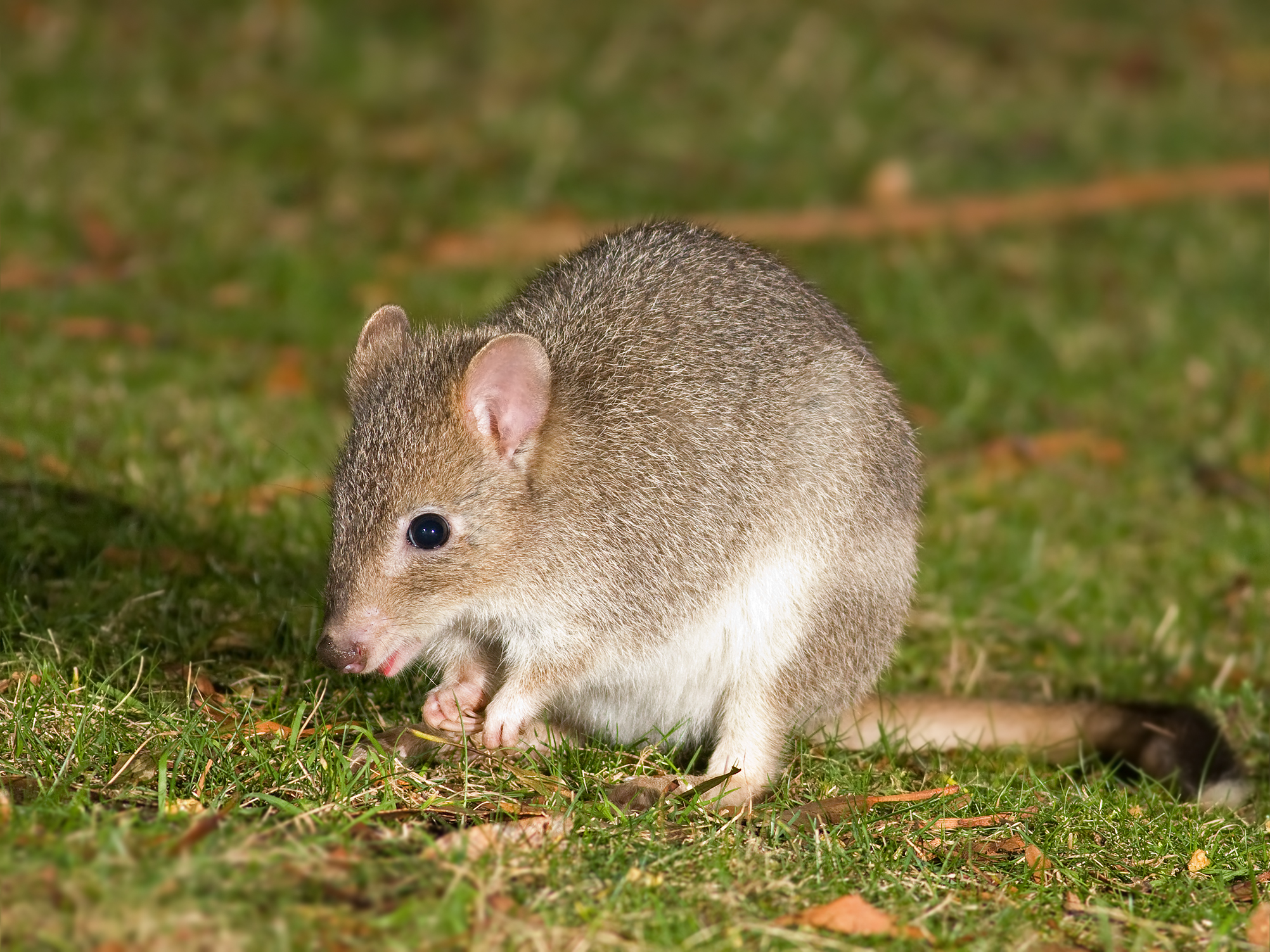
- Eastern bettong

Scientific classification
- Kingdom: Animalia
- Phylum: Chordata
- Class: Mammalia
- Infraclass: Marsupialia
- Order: Diprotodontia
- Family: Potoroidae
- Subfamily: Potoroinae
- Tribe: Bettongini
- Genus: Bettongia; J. E. Gray, 1837

Type species
- Bettongia setosa J. E. Gray, 1837 (= Kangurus gaimardi Desmarest, 1822)

Species
- B. gaimardi; B. lesueur; B. ogilbyi; "B. penicillata"; B. tropica

= Bettong =

Bettongs

Genus of marsupials

Bettongs, species of the genus Bettongia, are potoroine marsupials once common in Australia. They are important ecosystem engineers displaced during the colonisation of the continent, and are vulnerable to threatening factors such as altered fire regimes, land clearing, pastoralism and introduced predatory species such as the fox and cat.

== Conservation status ==
All species of the genus have been severely affected by ecological changes since the European colonisation of Australia. Those that have not become extinct became largely confined to islands and protected reserves and are dependent on re-population programs. The diversity of the genus was poorly understood before their extirpation from the mainland, and new taxa have been identified in specimens newly discovered and already held in museum collections. In August 2021, 40 bettongs were released in different parts of South Australia after being raised in captivity to increase their numbers.

== Taxonomy ==
Four extant species are recognised:

- Eastern bettong (B. gaimardi)
- Boodie (B. lesueur)
- Woylie (B. ogilbyi)
- Northern bettong (B. tropica)

The recently extinct species are:

- Desert bettong (B. anhydra). Only known from one specimen collected in the Tanami in 1933 and subfossil material from the Nullarbor. The causes of extinction are presumed to be predation by feral cats and foxes, and changes to the fire regime.
- Nullarbor dwarf bettong (B. pusilla). Known only from subfossil remains but considered to have survived until European settlement.
- Brush-tailed bettong (B. penicillata). Previously a senior synonym of the Woylie (B. ogilbyi), it was recently split.
- Little bettong (B. haoucharae). Known from subfossil and mummified remains from the Nullarbor Plains and Great Victoria Desert.

The fossil species is:

- Bettongia moyesi, Middle Miocene bettong from Riversleigh

The phylogeny of the genus has seen a grouping of 'brush-tailed' taxa allied within the genus Bettongia, and this includes the extant species Bettongia gaimardi, B. tropica and B. penicillata.

A conservative arrangement of modern and fossil taxa of Bettongia may be summarised as

- family Potoroidae:

- subfamily †Bulungamayinae
- subfamily †Palaeopotoroinae
- subfamily Potoroinae

- genus Aepyprymnus
- genus Bettongia

- species †Bettongia anhydra
- species Bettongia gaimardi
- species Bettongia lesueur
- species †Bettongia moyesi
- species Bettongia ogilbyi
- species †Bettongia penicillata
- species †Bettongia haoucharae
- species †Bettongia pusilla
- species Bettongia tropica

- genus †Milliyowi
- genus †Caloprymnus
- genus Potorous
- genus †Purtia
- genus †Wakiewakie
- genus †Gumardee

The species Aepyprymnus rufescens is referred to as the rufous bettong, despite not being a member of the genus Bettongia.

== See also ==
- Kangaroo rat – a heteromyid rodent of North America
