= Jerrabomberra Wetlands =

Nature reserve in Canberra, Australia

Jerrabomberra Wetlands Nature Reserve
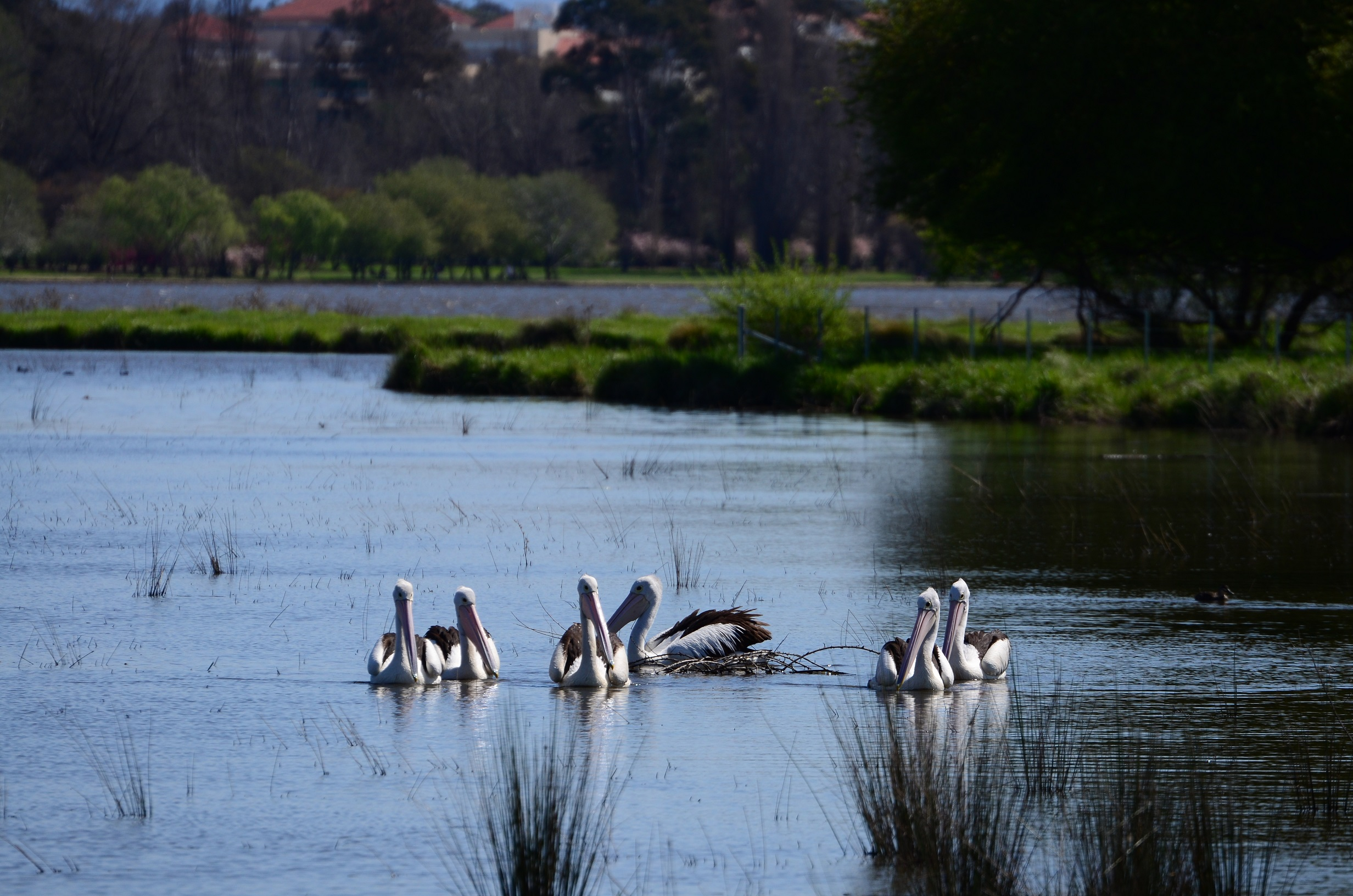
- Pelicans at Jerrabomberra Wetlands. Photo by Michael Machonachie

- Location within Australian Capital Territory
- Location: Australian Capital Territory, Canberra
- Coordinates: 35°18′43.369″S 149°9′34.531″E
- Area: 174 ha (430 acres)
- Governing body: Woodlands and Wetlands Trust, ACT Government
- Website: www.jerrabomberrawetlands.org.au

Jerrabomberra Wetlands Nature Reserve is a nationally important group of small wetlands in central Canberra. The Wetlands are on a part of the Molonglo River - Jerrabomberra Creek floodplain that became permanently inundated when the Molonglo River was dammed to form Lake Burley Griffin in 1964.

ACT Parks and Conservation Service manages the Wetlands in partnership with the Woodlands and Wetlands Trust.

Major water bodies at Jerrabomberra Wetlands include Shoveler Pool, Kelly’s Swamp, Molonglo Reach, Jerrabomberra Billabong, Jerrabomberra Creek, Jerrabomberra Pool, and a silt trap. The Jerrabomberra Backwaters are palaeochannels formed by the Molonglo River as it flooded and shifted course over geological time.

People use Jerrabomberra Wetlands for recreation, such as walking and nature walks, bird watching, and fishing. Jogging and cycling in the wetlands area are discouraged except if passing through on the main path, because they disturb fauna. Dogs are prohibited. Canoeists and kayakers use Molonglo Reach, and larger boats are allowed there via permit.

Nearby places of interest include the Kingston Foreshore (cafés), Royal Military College Duntroon, and Pialligo Estate (wineries, plant nurseries and cafés). The Woodlands and Wetlands Trust facilitates events, education and community engagement through partnerships and co-funding. New residential developments are planned for the western and southern edges of the Nature Reserve, and they will bring thousands more visitors to the Reserve.

The Jerrabomberra Wetlands Nature Reserve is a summer feeding ground for Latham's snipe, which is a relatively rare waterbird protected under the Environment Protection and Biodiversity Conservation Act 1999 (EPBC Act) and listed under the international migratory bird agreements with China (CAMBA), Japan, and the Republic of Korea (ROKAMBA). Latham’s snipe migrate between northern Asia and Australia for the Canberra winter. Jerrabomberra Wetlands are habitat for a range of other fauna, both terrestrial and aquatic, including other birds, turtles, frogs, platypus and water rats (rakali), and snakes, as well as foxes (a predator introduced to Australia from Europe, which preys on Australian native fauna), and other pest species. Outside the reserve, birds in the area also use the nearby sewage treatment ponds and turf farm for shelter and food.

== History ==
=== Aboriginal heritage ===
Modern Jerrabomberra Wetlands is a site where local descendants of the first Indigenous inhabitants maintain their cultural connections. Groups engage in education, art, social gatherings, and land management practices such as prescribed burns, or cool burns. Burns are conducted by the Murrumbung Rangers, who are Indigenous ACT Government rangers.

The floodplain on which Jerrabomberra Wetlands Nature Reserve currently sits has been lived on for at least 25,000 years. The area has cultural and historical significance as a meeting place between the Ngunnawal people who together with the Ngambri, are the traditional custodians of the Canberra region. Neighbours include the Ngarigo from the tablelands to the south, the Wolgalu from the high country to the south-west, the Wiradjuri from the inland north-west, the Gundungurra from the north, and the Yuin from the coast. Extensive stone assemblages found around the Pialligo area (which was called 'Biyaligee') suggest the presence of a large lowland campsite.

The Molonglo River was a significant food source. In low flow periods the river and ephemeral ponds supported small fish, turtles and yabbies. Other local species (prior to abrupt changes following European settlement and subsequent land clearing) included kangaroo, wombat, echidna, birds, fish, snakes and lizards.

Non-animal food, fibres and medicine were drawn from the area’s diverse forest, woodland, grassland and aquatic flora. Stone and other materials for tool and weapon making were used in trade.

Jerrabomberra Creek, also called Girimbombery or Giridombera, is recognised by the Ngunnawal people as a spiritual pathway that guided visitors from the south to the central corroboree grounds in an area now lying partly underneath Lake Burley Griffin. The last corroboree known to have happened on the Molonglo River floodplain was in 1862.

=== European settlers ===
The earliest written accounts by European settlers of the region appeared in 1820. They describe the area as primarily grassland below woodland and forests on hills and ridges. The area became known as the Limestone Plains, because of its stony outcrops.

Robert Campbell was the first European to settle in the area that is now the Wetlands, when he bought a 5000 acre block of land to add to his property called Pialligo (later called Duntroon), part of which is now the Jerrabomberra Wetlands Nature Reserve. Campbell's sheep occupied the area near the confluence of the Molonglo River and Jerrabomberra Creek, with paddocks of lucerne (alfalfa, stock fodder) in the black soil flats next to the Molonglo. Willow trees were first planted along the Molonglo River area during the mid-19th century. Willows now are considered a major pest plant.

The river and Jerrabomberra Creek went through intervals of flooding and drought. Severe flooding made streams impassable, while drought reduced them to disconnected stagnant puddles. Landholders began ringbarking trees around 1880, to kill the trees so they would not use up groundwater and further dry the streams.

Steady population growth in the surrounding region gave reason for expanding this pastoral land use. Production was accelerated by advances in agricultural technology and steam-powered machinery, as well as by the arrival of the railway to nearby Queanbeyan in 1887.

Aside from farmland, the Duntroon estate also housed a windmill to grind wheat for flour. The surrounding floodplain was known as Mill Flat, and Jerrabomberra Creek at that time was called Mill Creek. The mill itself was destroyed by violent storms in 1874.

In 1912 the farmed area was acquired by the Commonwealth Government. This followed the designation of Canberra as the Federal Capital Territory on 1 January 1911st, 1911. During the design stages for the city, a suggestion was made for ‘ornamental waters’, to be created in part by weirs. This ultimately led (decades later) to the formation of Lake Burley Griffin, permanently raising the groundwater table under the floodplain, contributing to the formation of Jerrabomberra Wetlands.

=== World War I and early 1920s ===
During World War I, the nearby Royal Military College used Mill Flat (part of the old Duntroon estate) for housing and training military personnel in the use of weapons, strategy and field engineering, and for practising manoeuvres.

In 2015, trial excavations on the floodplain within Jerrabomberra Wetlands Nature Reserve uncovered a trench system that was originally part of the Trench Warfare and Bombing School at Duntroon. Its training program incorporated the most recent developments in design and technology. In 1916 the Governor-General declared it was “similar in every respect to those in Flanders” and “the best system of trenches in Australia”. A self-guided Trench Trail, which allows visitors to appreciate the history, layout and complexity of the system, is accessible from the Cycleway. Part of military field engineering training included the construction of suspension and pontoon bridges. These skills were put to local use in 1925 when, during a record flood, cadets built a pontoon bridge to restore access to southern Canberra.

During the War, the western part of the floodplain was modified with an embankment to carry the railway into the city. This was a temporary version of a much larger embankment (the Causeway) in the plan by Walter Burley Griffin, which would have carried both railway and roadways, and retained an enormous East Lake, which would have covered the floodplain.

An earthen embankment was built across Jerrabomberra Creek which was diverted northwards in a channel to the Molonglo River, where a timber trestle bridge carried the railway across the river. The line was opened for carriage of construction materials and workers in 1921. Floods in 1922 broke the embankment and destroyed the trestle bridge, and after another major flood in 1925 the line to the city was never re-built. That also meant the end of the vast East Lake of Griffin’s plan.

The channel cut for Jerrabomberra Creek was flooded after formation of Lake Burley Griffin, and the Jerrabomberra Backwaters have formed where this cut intersects with palaeochannels.

In 1920 Mill Flat was divided into lucerne leases, intended to assist in the resettlement of WWI returned soldiers. The floods of 1922 and 1925 made these smallholdings unviable, and they were replaced by commercial dairy leases in 1926, as part of efforts to boost local food production for the rapidly growing capital city. This led to the later renaming of the floodplain as Dairy Flat.

=== Nature reserve ===
Starting from around the mid-1970s, environmental advocates called for the floodplain wetlands to become a nature reserve, because of the area's diverse wildlife and its potential use for education, ecological research, and public engagement in relation to conservation and the environment.

The Jerrabomberra Wetlands Advisory Group was formed, and it held its first meeting in September 1987. A draft policy plan was produced by the National Capital Development Commission (responsible for Canberra's development) in 1988. In 1990, the first part of the Jerrabomberra Wetlands Nature Reserve was officially gazetted under the Nature Conservation Act 1980. By this time, some development to allow greater public use had already taken place, including the construction of bird hides, fencing, a bridge, plantings, a car park, and other alterations designed to facilitate visits by the public with minimal disruption to local wildlife.

Principles for managing the Wetlands area were influenced not only by its value for education and research but also by the nearness of urban residential and light industrial zones and the Canberra Airport. In 1974 the possibility that the wetlands would attract more large spiralling birds, such as pelicans, spoonbills, herons and ibis, was first identified as a potential hazard for aircraft. From then on, planning and development of the Wetlands area has aimed to mitigate this possibility.

In 2011, the ACT Government established the Woodlands and Wetlands Trust to guide conservation management of Jerrabomberra Wetlands as well as Mulligans Flat at the northern edge of the ACT. As part of its work the Trust aims to understand, rebuild and showcase the biodiversity and cultural values of these two sites, and to facilitate environmental research. Volunteer activities at Jerrabomberra Wetlands Nature Reserve mostly involve Friends of Jerrabomberra Wetlands (a group set up to care for the nature reserve), and include weeding and planting and assisting in specialist-led operations such as monitoring water quality, monitoring birds, and undertaking surveys of other fauna (such as frogs and platypus).

Jerrabomberra Wetlands is listed on the ACT Heritage Register (1988), to be 'maintained and managed as a wetland habitat to retain the biological diversity of the place', and was considered for protection under the Heritage Act 2004 in 2018 as part of the Canberra Nature Park.

== Fauna ==
Jerrabomberra Wetlands is visited by, or home to, 77 species of waterbird, and 16 species use it as a breeding location. Over 170 species of wetland birds, woodland birds and grassland birds have been recorded at Jerrabomberra Wetlands, and eight species of international migratory birds use Jerrabomberra Wetlands on a seasonal basis.

Over the years, eleven vagrant palearctic waders have been recorded using the Jerrabomberra Wetlands during the Australian summer months. In addition, the common sandpiper (regarded as rare) and the sharp-tailed sandpiper (regarded as uncommon) are occasional visitors. Another palaearctic wader, the protected Latham's snipe (Gallinago hardwickii) also uses the wetlands during the austral summer. All palaearctic waders including the Latham's snipe are known to spend the middle months of each calendar year (the austral winter) summering in the highly productive feeding grounds in northern Asia, thousands of kilometres away from Jerrabomberra Wetlands. Individual snipe at the Wetlands have been fitted with leg bands, and they are the focus of an international project to understand the ecology of the species and their critical habitat requirements. Sixty Latham's snipe were counted at Jerrabomberra Wetlands during the 2020–21 season. That number makes the Wetlands a very significant site for this precious bird species; it means these visits and the Wetlands are a federal "Matter of National Environmental Significance". See the Jerrabomberra Wetlands Facebook post on 21 January 2021 for the count in early 2021 and a photo.

The Australasian bittern (Botaurus poiciloptilus) and the painted-snipe (Rostratula australis) are other endangered bird species seen at the Wetlands.

Platypus (Ornithorhyncus anatinus) are among other notable native fauna using the Wetlands, Molonglo River and Jerrabomberra Creek, as are eastern long-necked turtles (Chelodina longicollis), the rakali (Hydromys chrysogaster), frogs and fish.

The eastern long-necked turtle occurs throughout south-eastern Australia. Although it is considered a common species, there is evidence that populations are declining, especially in the Murray River system, of which Jerrabomberra Wetlands is part. The main threats to survival of this turtle species are: foxes preying on turtle eggs; alterations to the turtles’ habitat; and being killed on roads during this species’ overland movement between sites. Female turtles lay their eggs from November to January in the Canberra region, and the Woodlands and Wetlands Trust and volunteers are running a program to protect the turtle nests and hatchlings to try to reduce the impact of foxes on this turtle population.

The Jerrabomberra Wetlands area is home to seven frog species (Crinia signifera, Crinia parinsignifera, Limnodynastes dumerilii, Limnodynastes tasmaniensis, Limnodynastes peronii, Litoria peronii, and Litoria verreauxii). The habitats here, which include both ephemeral ponds and permanent wetlands, provide the ideal environment for breeding, foraging and sheltering for these species. Threats to frogs include: introduced pest species (such as cats and foxes), pathogens, and water quality issues. Frog numbers and species are regularly monitored by volunteers at several hundred wetland survey sites in the Canberra region, including nine at Jerrabomberra Wetlands.

Endangered fish species Macquarie perch (Macquaria australasica) and silver perch (Bidyanus bidyanus) have been recorded in the Molonglo River. Lake Burley Griffin, and therefore all the wetlands directly connected to it including Jerrabomberra Wetlands, contains both native and introduced fish species. Recreational fisheries (Murray cod, golden perch) are maintained in the lake by stocking (consequently also in Molonglo Reach). Two introduced fish species are of particular concern because of their negative effects on wetland ecology: these are common carp (Cyprinus carpio) and eastern gambusia (Gambusia holbrooki) which is also called mosquitofish. Common carp disturb sediment and uproot aquatic plants, and this results in turbid water and an altered wetland ecosystem. Gambusia eat the eggs of native fish and frogs, and aggressively nip the fins of much larger fish. A third introduced species, redfin (Perca fluviatilis), is also highly predatory and common in Lake Burley Griffin.

== Vegetation ==
Jerrabomberra Wetlands has woodlands, grasslands and wetlands, all with vegetation that is modified from that which was here before European settlement. Many of the current plant species are a legacy of past land uses. The woodlands (23% of the overall area) were planted, mostly in the 1990s, with Australian species not necessarily local to this area. The grasslands (66% of the area) are dominated by agricultural grasses and weeds mostly introduced (overseas species), with a scattering of native plants that have self-established. The wetlands and riparian vegetation has self-established from seeds and fragments. Thanks to this legacy, there are only 68 indigenous species among the 293 plant species recorded as part of vegetation mapping.

The wetland vegetation is diverse and species-rich. There are ten wetland vegetation types here, ranging in height from 3 m tall rushlands and grasslands to very short herbfields less than 10 cm tall. The list of wetland species include several that have rarely been recorded in the ACT (Baumea articulata, Lemna disperma, Eleocharis atricha, Eleocharis sphacelata, Limosella australis, and Schoenoplectus pungens). Two of these self-established wetland vegetation types have developed to be very similar to wetland vegetation communities that occur naturally in nearby New South Wales.

The abundance and richness of the aquatic fauna and particularly the waterbirds at Jerrabomberra Wetlands can be attributed to diversity of its wetland vegetation.

Pest plants also occur at the Wetlands, and they are subject to continual removal by the Friends group and by ACT Parks and Conservation Service staff. A revegetation program aims to replace these plants with riparian and native tree species (e.g. casuarinas), which should improve fauna habitats.

== Landforms and hydrology ==
View from Lavarack Road, Duntroon

The present-day Jerrabomberra Wetlands floodplain has been modified by landfill and by excavations (since flooded). Therefore, the wetlands in the Reserve are a mixture of human-formed and natural formations. Similarly, some of the higher features on this floodplain, such as the levee bank, the mounds for electricity pylons, and the raised embankment for the Monaro Highway, are products of dumping builders’ spoil and fill from major excavations nearby, including the excavation of Capital Hill for Australia's new Parliament House.

As of 2021, the Reserve has 27 wetlands, all relatively small and mostly less than 1.5 metres deep. The 27 wetlands range from being permanently wet (with stable or fluctuating water levels) to being ephemeral (holding water only temporarily after rain). Shoveler Pool and the paleochannels are examples of temporary perched wetlands. Kelly’s Swamp and Jerrabomberra Billabongs are deep ‘window’ wetlands intersecting the loamy sand and gravel groundwater aquifer. These wetlands periodically dry out, as do natural wetlands. The dry time is an important part of the life cycle of the wetlands themselves and of their naturally adapted flora and fauna.

Two of the 27 wetlands have been constructed recently. These two (near Jerrabomberra Billabong and Jerrabomberra Pool) are specially designed as water-quality-treatment wetlands, where water from Jerrabomberra Creek can linger and lose contaminants before it flows on into Lake Burley Griffin, and the lower Molonglo River downstream of the lake, and the Murrumbidgee River beyond that.

Four water sources have been identified across the reserve: (i) direct rainfall, (ii) surface run-off and/or stormwater from the adjacent industrial area, sewage treatment ponds and turf farm, and future residential developments nearby, (iii) flooding of the Molonglo River and Jerrabomberra Creek across their floodplains, and (iv) groundwater.

Much of the Molonglo River floodplain is underlain by a shallow aquifer, comprising silt, sand and gravels, ranging in thickness from 4 metres to 8 metres, and overlain by a surface layer of clayey loam that is 2 metres to 3 metres thick.

The aquifer is recharged via Jerrabomberra Creek in association an aeolian sand dune adjacent to Jerrabomberra Pool; rainfall infiltration; and by groundwater inflows via the turf farm to the east of the Reserve. Data from water-level monitoring of groundwater bores show that there are no connections between the aquifer and Lake Burley Griffin or the Causeway Channel to the west, nor with the Molonglo River to the north.

The shallow aquifer is important in determining water depths in the ‘window’ wetlands. A groundwater hydraulic model has been developed, enabling forecasting of changes in water regimes associated with Climate Change into the future.

A second shallow aquifer is located in the Billabong area of Jerrabomberra Creek. This aquifer comprises more open gravels than the Molonglo River Floodplain aquifer, and it is recharged via stormwater discharges, rainfall, and Jerrabomberra Creek.

Overbank flood flows occur for flood events larger than the 1-in-30 years AEP (annual exceedance probability ). For the 1-in-100 year AEP flood, some 60% of the total flow is across the Molonglo floodplain. A Reserve flood model has been developed to assess the pattern of flows in the palaeochannels and across the floodplain, for a range of flood events.

== See also ==
- Protected areas of Australian Capital Territory
