= Elachista spathacea =

Scientific classification
- Kingdom: Animalia
- Phylum: Arthropoda
- Clade: Pancrustacea
- Class: Insecta
- Order: Lepidoptera
- Family: Elachistidae
- Genus: Elachista
- Species: E. spathacea

Binomial name
- Elachista spathacea Kaila, 2011

Species of moth

Elachista spathacea is a moth of the family Elachistidae that is endemic to Australia.
