= Elachista flavicilia =

Scientific classification
- Kingdom: Animalia
- Phylum: Arthropoda
- Clade: Pancrustacea
- Class: Insecta
- Order: Lepidoptera
- Family: Elachistidae
- Genus: Elachista
- Species: E. flavicilia

Binomial name
- Elachista flavicilia Kaila, 2011

Species of moth

Elachista flavicilia is a moth of the family Elachistidae that is endemic to Australia.

The wingspan is 9–11 millimetres (0.35–0.43 in) for males and 9.9–10.7 millimetres (0.39–0.42 in) for females.
