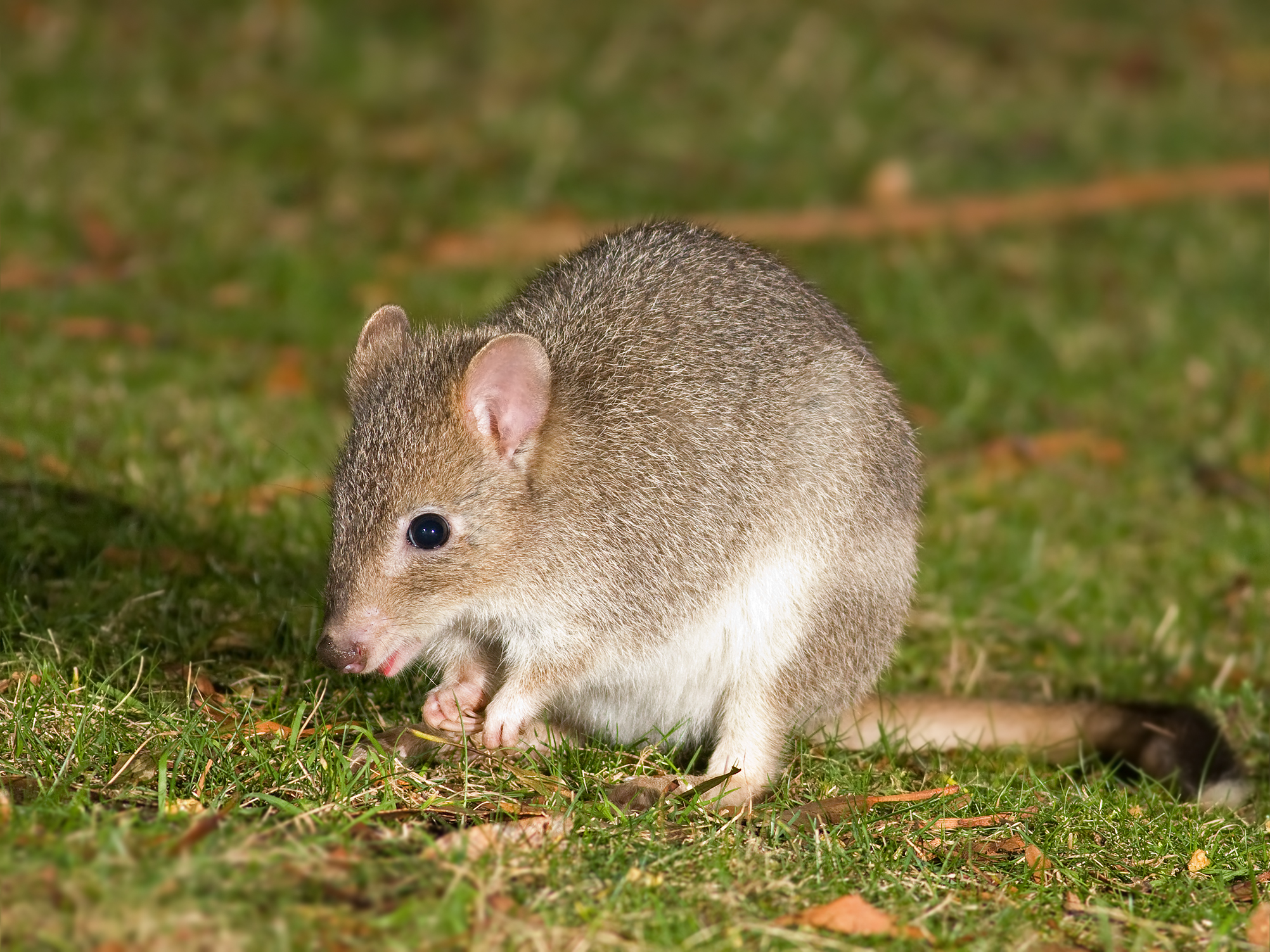

Conservation status
- Near Threatened (IUCN 3.1)
- CITES Appendix I

Scientific classification
- Kingdom: Animalia
- Phylum: Chordata
- Class: Mammalia
- Infraclass: Marsupialia
- Order: Diprotodontia
- Family: Potoroidae
- Genus: Bettongia
- Species: B. gaimardi

Binomial name
- Bettongia gaimardi (Desmarest, 1822)

Subspecies
- Bettongia gaimardi cuniculus †Bettongia gaimardi gaimardi
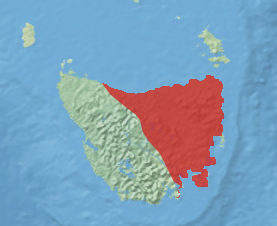
- Present distribution of Bettongia gaimardi

= Eastern bettong =

Species of marsupial

The eastern bettong (Bettongia gaimardi), also known as the southern or Tasmanian bettong, is a small, hopping, rat-like mammal native to grassy forests of southeastern Australia and Tasmania. A member of the rat-kangaroo family (Potoroidae), it is active at night and feeds on fungi and plant roots. Like most marsupials, it carries its young in a pouch. The eastern bettong is under pressure by introduced predators and habitat loss. The subspecies on mainland Australia (B. g. gaimardi) is extinct, but populations of the Tasmanian subspecies (B. g. cuniculus) have been reintroduced there.

The animal is called balbo by the Ngunnawal, an Aboriginal people who used to keep them as pets.

== Subspecies ==
Two formerly recognised species, Bettongia cuniculus (Tasmanian bettong) and Bettongia gaimardi (eastern bettong), were placed into a single species with two subspecies by Wakefield in 1967:

- B. g. gaimardi, mainland subspecies (now extinct)
- B. g. cuniculus, Tasmanian subspecies

The introduction of the red fox and European rabbit to Australia led to the extinction of the mainland subspecies during the 1920s. The Tasmanian subspecies still exists.

In 2012, a small population was reintroduced to the mainland in Canberra. The reintroduction to Mulligans Flat Woodland Sanctuary was successful and led to further reintroductions using an on-site breeding program, with individuals sourced from the nearby Tidbinbilla Nature Reserve and wild eastern bettongs translocated from Tasmania.

== Diet and behaviour ==
This animal's habitat is dry, open eucalypt forests and grassy woodlands at altitudes between sea level and 1,000 metres (3,300 ft).

A major component of their diet is truffles and other underground fungi, as well as roots and tubers. Insects and grubs are also eaten. It is unique in that it will travel up to 1.5 km (0.93 mi) from its nest to a feeding area, a considerable distance for such a small creature.

A nocturnal animal, the bettong sleeps during the day in a domed nest. The nests are made with densely woven grass, leaves and shredded bark in a sheltered site such as a shallow depression in the ground or under a fallen log or clump of vegetation. The animal uses its curved prehensile tail to transport the nesting materials to the nest site. The animal only uses the nest for one or two nights, before it moves on in search of food.

Like other bettongs, the eastern bettong is a continuous breeder, producing young throughout the year. The gestation period is 21 days, after which the infant (referred to as a "joey") remains in the pouch for an additional 105 days.

== Threats ==
While the mainland population became extinct in the 1920s, the Tasmanian population has remained secure. One concern is that most of the bettongs are found on private land, with only two groups found within reserves. Red foxes are a major threat. The International Union for Conservation of Nature has raised the threat status for eastern bettongs from least concern to near threatened.
