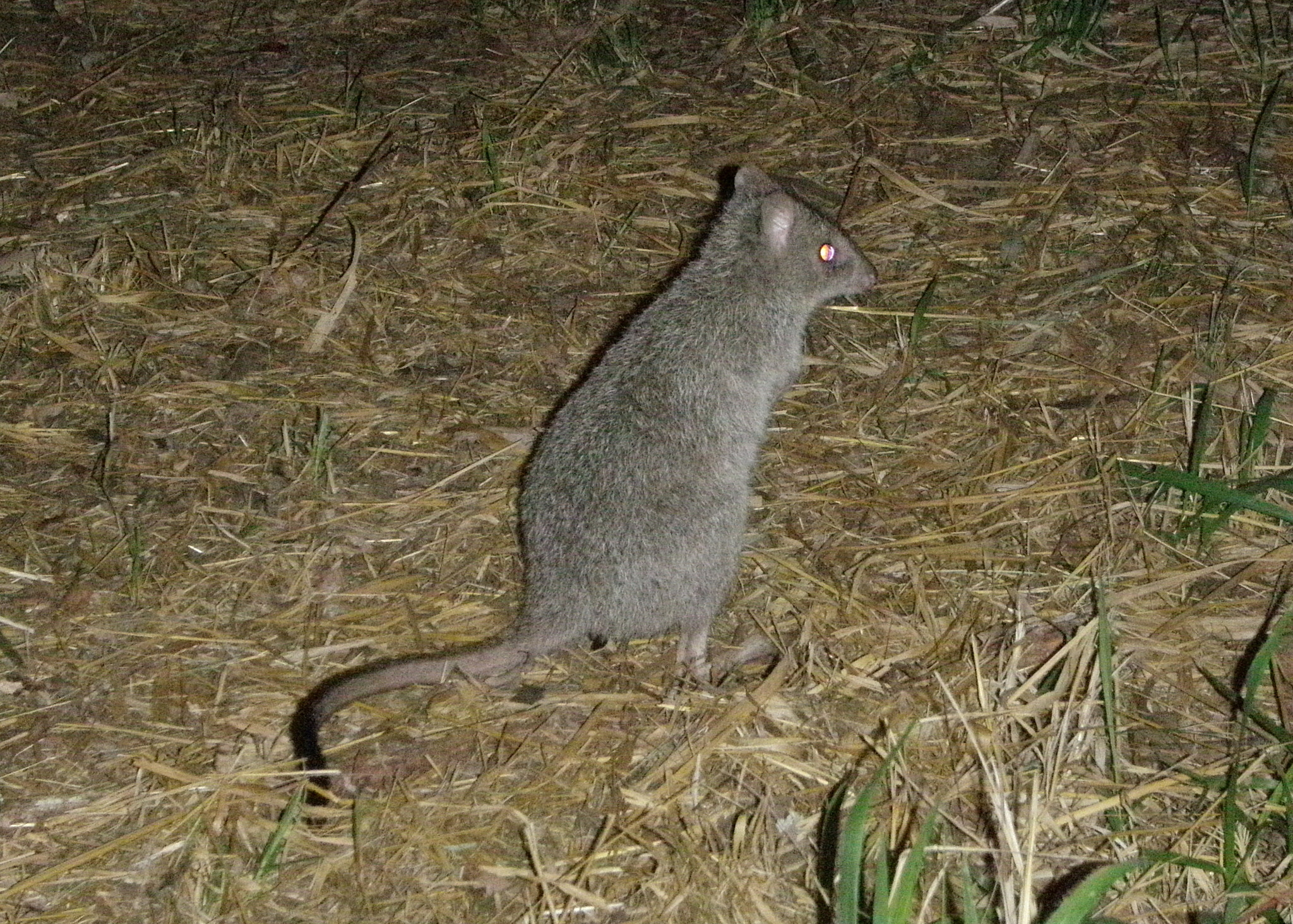

Conservation status
- Endangered (IUCN 3.1)
- CITES Appendix I

Scientific classification
- Kingdom: Animalia
- Phylum: Chordata
- Class: Mammalia
- Infraclass: Marsupialia
- Order: Diprotodontia
- Family: Potoroidae
- Genus: Bettongia
- Species: B. tropica

Binomial name
- Bettongia tropica Wakefield, 1967.
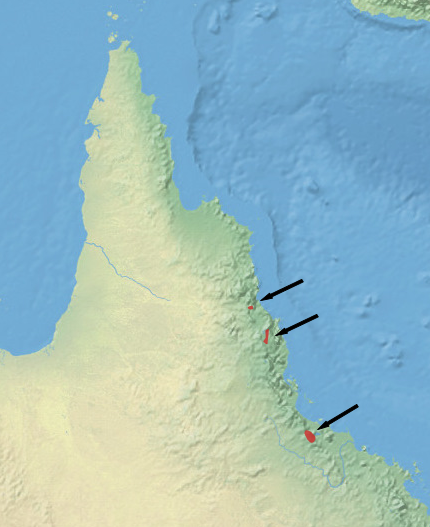
- Distribution of the northern bettong

= Northern bettong =

Species of marsupial

The northern bettong (Bettongia tropica) is a small, endangered, rabbit-sized mammal native to forests in northeast Australia. A member of the rat-kangaroo family (Potoroidae), it moves by hopping and shelters in a concealed nest by day, feeding at night on roots and fungi. It is also a marsupial and carries its young in a pouch. The northern bettong is threatened by habitat loss, and is now restricted to a few small areas.

== Habitat ==
The northern bettong is restricted to some areas of mixed open Eucalyptus woodlands and Allocasuarina forests bordering rainforests in far northeastern Queensland, Australia.

== Lifespan ==
The typical bettong lives in the wild for about 4 to 6 years. According to the Smithsonian's National Zoologist, they can, under proper care, live up to the age of 15 years.

== Behavior ==
All species of the bettong are nocturnal. They carry nesting materials with their long tails and can be found in burrows that they escape to during the day. They like to feed at night and their range of food varies. They rarely drink water, and refrain from eating any green plants. They primarily seek fungus and plants such as mushrooms, tubers, scrubs, fruits and seeds. They use their front claws to dig for tubers, identifying them via their sense of smell. These animals are able to reproduce at any time of the year, and can produce three young in a favorable year. This high rate of reproduction can lead to fluctuations in population growth.

It spends the day in a well concealed nest constructed beneath a tree, within a clump of grass or in other litter collected at ground level. Nesting material is carried using its prehensile tail. Ectomycorrhizal fungal sporocarps are the staple diet of the northern bettong. These are dug from beneath the soil at the bases of trees, and work to date suggests substantial nightly movements are often required to detect this irregularly-distributed food source. Other foods in the diet include grass roots and tubers, lilies, herbs, and sedges. The northern bettong appears to breed all year round, and like other relatives of the kangaroos, the joey is carried in a pouch until it is old enough to follow the mother as a 'young-at-foot'.

== Threats ==
The northern bettong is listed as a threatened species. It is estimated that there are only 1000 left in the wild with only two known populations in the Mareeba region of the Atherton Tablelands (Davies Creek, Emu Creek and Tinaroo Creek). The most significant threat to the northern bettong is habitat loss caused by land clearing for agriculture.

A Recovery Team including government agencies, scientists, traditional owners and volunteer groups are focusing conservation efforts are focusing on improving habitat.
