= Vancouver's Cairn =

Coordinates: 35.04222°S 117.92139°E

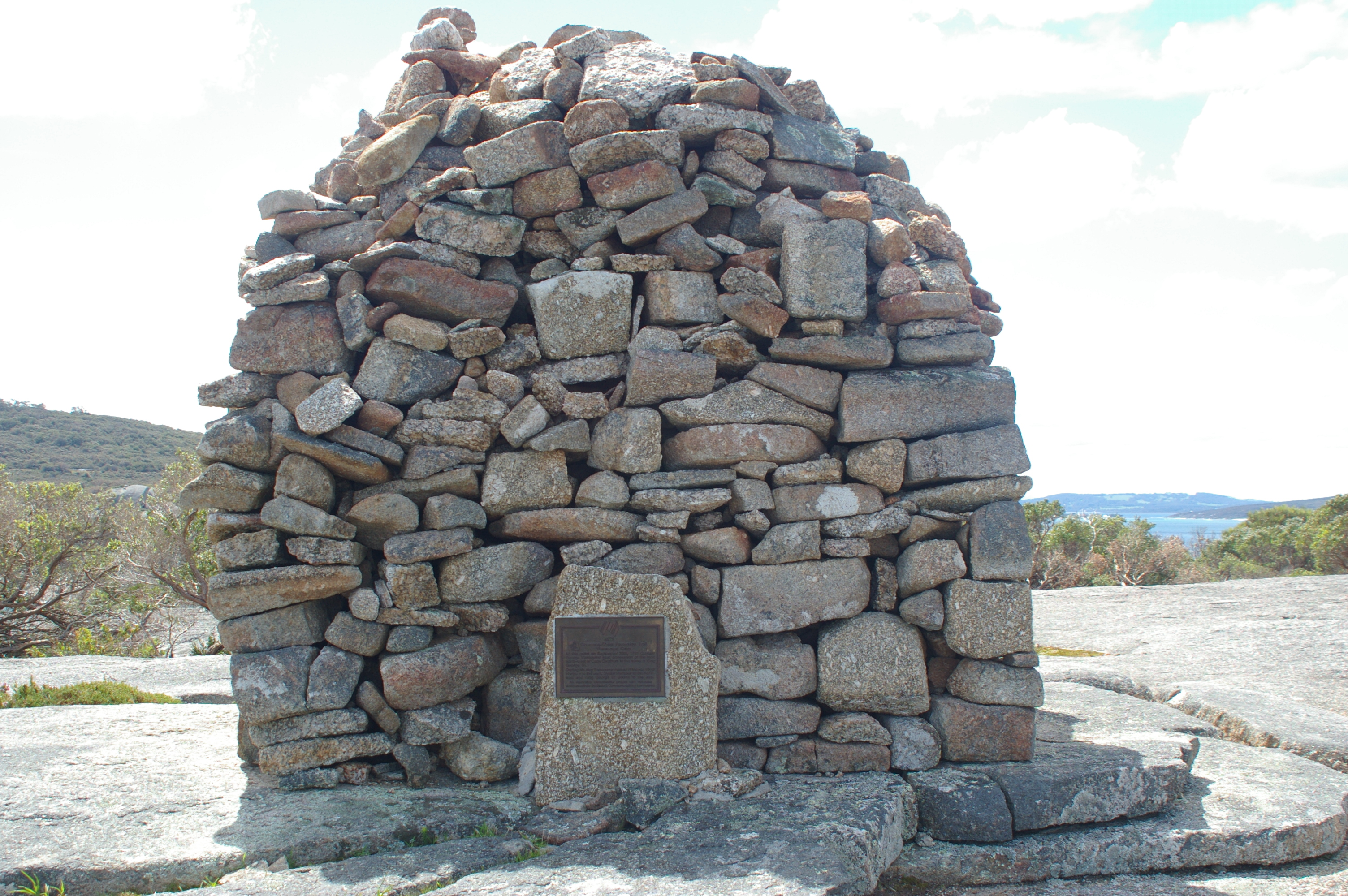
Vancouver's Cairn on Point Possession, Albany WA

Vancouver's Cairn is a cairn located on Point Possession, Vancouver Peninsula, overlooking Princess Royal Harbour approximately 5 kilometres (3 mi) south of Albany in the Great Southern region of Western Australia.

The cairn commemorates the landing of George Vancouver in 1791. Vancouver was sailing to America when he entered and named King George Sound. He stayed a short while before departing to the east.

At the top of a high rocky point, the monument is of freestone and 1.8 metres (6 ft) in height. It was constructed between 1791 and 1972, was classified by the National Trust in 1977, and was placed on the Register of the National Estate in 1980.

== See also ==
- List of places on the State Register of Heritage Places in the City of Albany
