= Bettongia anhydra =

Conservation status
- Extinct (IUCN 3.1)

Scientific classification
- Kingdom: Animalia
- Phylum: Chordata
- Class: Mammalia
- Infraclass: Marsupialia
- Order: Diprotodontia
- Family: Potoroidae
- Genus: Bettongia
- Species: †B. anhydra

Binomial name
- †Bettongia anhydra H. H. Finlayson, 1957.

Species of marsupial

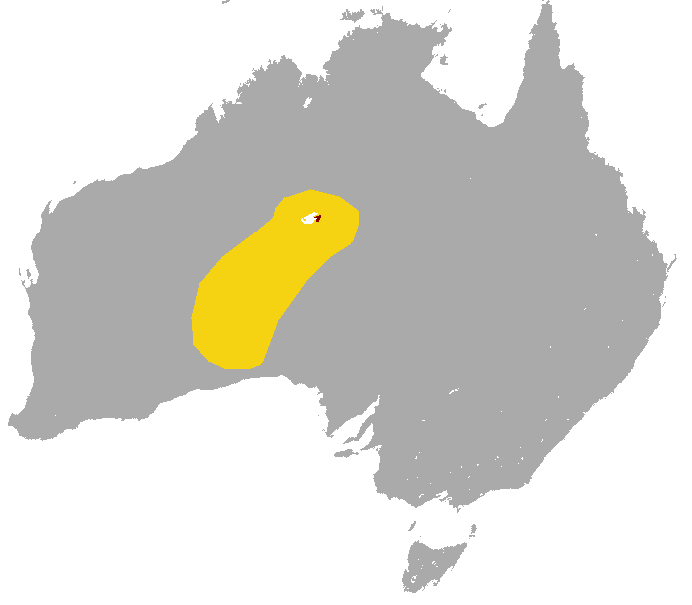
Former distribution of Bettongia anhydra

Bettongia anhydra, also known as desert bettong, is a recently extinct species of potoroine marsupial.

== Taxonomy ==
A skull collected in the 1930s that was placed as Bettongia penicillata anhydra, and later regarded as a synonym of Bettongia lesueur. The first description was by Hedley Herbert Finlayson, published in 1957. An examination of morphology and molecular evidence proposed this specimen as the type of this new species. The type was collected from a fresh carcass at Lake Mackay in the western Northern Territory by Michael Terry in 1933.

The phylogeny of the species separates this species and B. lesueur from lineages that emerged at a later period.

== Description ==
A species of genus Bettongia, small to medium sized mammals that are usually nocturnal and fungivorous. The dentary of Bettongia anhydra resembles that of the Potorous species and those of the bettong genus.
