= Elachista effusi =

Scientific classification
- Domain: Eukaryota
- Kingdom: Animalia
- Phylum: Arthropoda
- Class: Insecta
- Order: Lepidoptera
- Family: Elachistidae
- Genus: Elachista
- Species: E. effusi

Binomial name
- Elachista effusi Kaila, 2011

Species of moth

Elachista effusi is a moth of the family Elachistidae. It is found in Australia.
