= Territory Wildlife Park =

Zoo in the Northern Territory, Australia

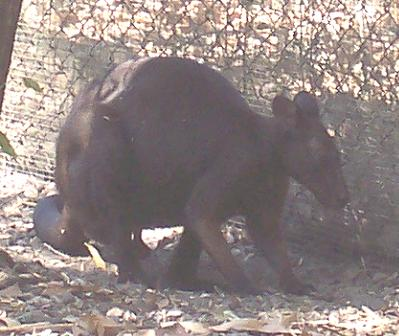
- Black wallaroo at the park
- Interactive map of Territory Wildlife Park
- 12.7102°S 130.9898°E
- Date opened: 1989
- Location: Berry Springs, Northern Territory, Australia
- Annual visitors: 61,200 (2017)
- Memberships: ZAA
- Owner: Parks and Wildlife Commission of the Northern Territory
- Website: www.territorywildlifepark.com.au

The Territory Wildlife Park is a zoo at Berry Springs in the Northern Territory of Australia, some 31 kilometres (19 mi) (about a 45 minutes drive) south of Darwin. It opened in 1989. Situated on 400 ha of natural bushland, it contains native animals and plants representative of Northern Territory, and especially Top End tropical monsoonal, environments. It contributes to their conservation through research programs as well as through public education. The three main habitats represented are woodland, wetland and monsoon vine forest.

The Territory Wildlife Park is a member of the Zoo and Aquarium Association (ZAA).

== Fauna ==
The many species of animals are kept in the park in various exhibit precincts including: 'Aquarium'; 'Billabong'; 'Monsoon Forest Walk'; 'Nocturnal House'; 'Oolloo Sandbar'; 'Paperbark Walk'; 'Rocky Ridge'; 'Walk-through Aviary' and 'Woodland Walk'. The species include:

Birds

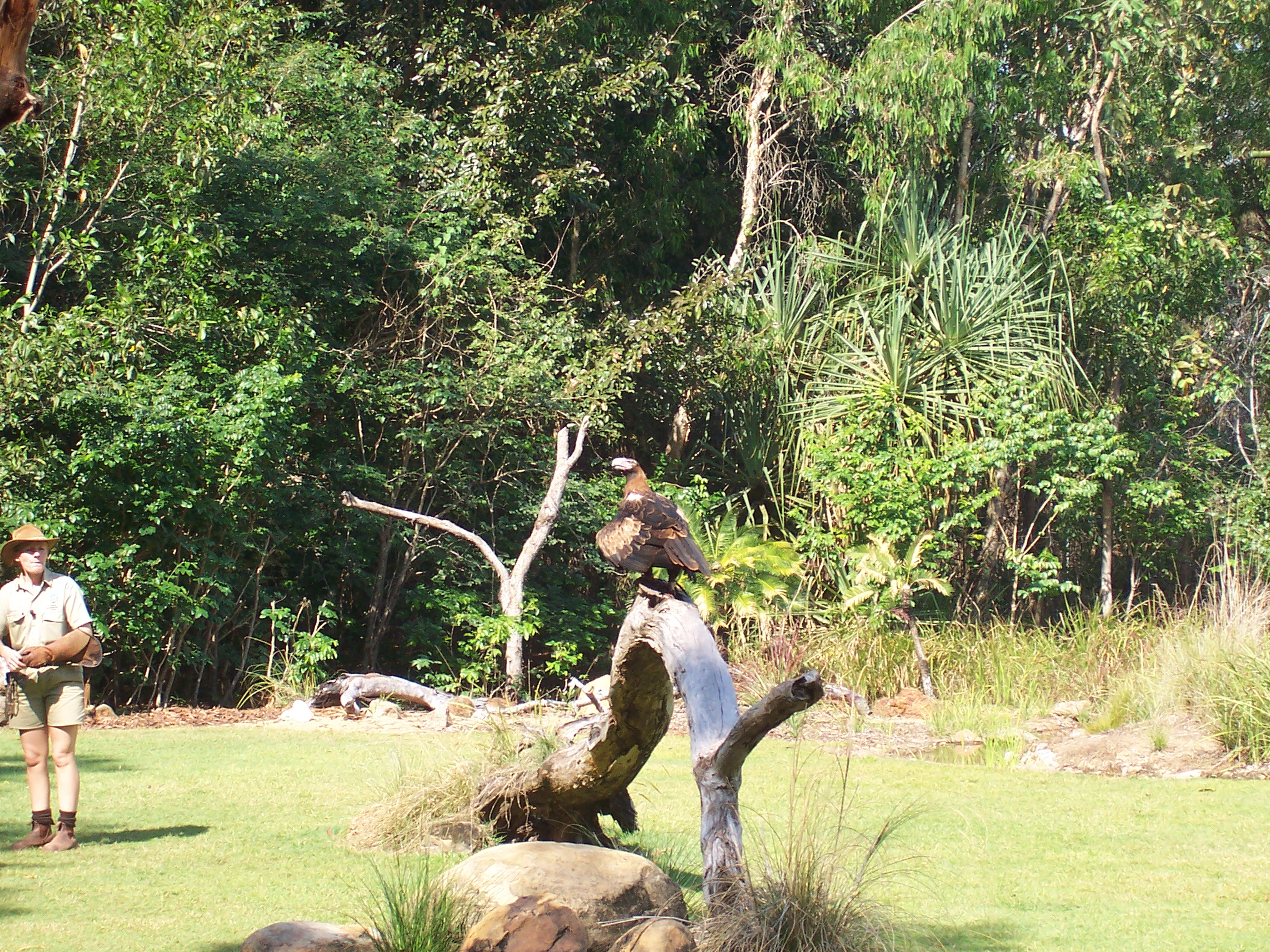
Wedge-tailed eagle with a keeper at the park's bird-show

- Australasian grebe
- Australian owlet-nightjar
- Australian pelican
- Bar-shouldered dove
- Beach stone-curlew
- Black-breasted buzzard
- Blue-faced honeyeater
- Blue-winged kookaburra
- Bush stone-curlew
- Bush thick-knee
- Channel-billed cuckoo
- Chestnut-breasted mannikin
- Comb-crested jacana
- Common koel
- Crimson finch
- Dollarbird
- Emerald ground dove
- Emu
- Figbird
- Forest kingfisher
- Gouldian finch
- Green pygmy goose
- Hooded parrot
- Jabiru
- Long-tailed finch
- Partridge pigeon
- Pheasant coucal
- Pied imperial pigeon
- Radjah shelduck
- Rainbow pitta
- Red-collared lorikeet
- Rose-crowned fruit dove
- Sacred kingfisher
- Southern boobook
- Spangled drongo
- Tawny frogmouth
- Tiwi masked owl
- Varied Lorikeet
- Wedge-tailed eagle
- White-bellied cuckoo-shrike
- White-breasted woodswallow
- White-throated honeyeater
- Yellow oriole

Fish

- Archerfish
- Barred grunter
- Banded rainbowfish
- Barcoo grunter
- Barramundi
- Beach-rock mangrove goby
- Bigfin mudskipper
- Black catfish
- Blue tang
- Blackmast (Strawman)
- Blue devil
- Blueback blue-eye
- Blue-green chromis
- Chequered rainbowfish
- Coal grunter
- Diamond mullet
- Dwarf rainbowfish
- Estuary cod
- Exquisite rainbowfish
- Fly-specked hardyhead
- Freshwater whipray
- Giant glassfish
- Giant gudgeon
- Gulf saratoga
- Hyrtl's catfish
- Indo-Pacific tarpon
- Lorentz's grunter
- Mangrove jack
- Largetooth sawfish
- Moorish idol
- Mouth almighty
- Pikey bream
- Poreless gudgeon
- Primitive archerfish
- Rendahl's catfish
- Reticulated glassfish
- Sailfin glass perchlet
- Shadow goby
- Sharpnose grunter
- Sooty grunter
- Spangled grunter
- Spotted blue-eye
- Spotted scat
- Starry pufferfish
- Threadfin rainbowfish
- Brownbanded bamboo shark
- Western gobbleguts
- Whitetail squirrelfish
- Wilson's mangrove goby
- Yellowfin surgeonfish
- Mangrove whipray
- Northern wobbegong
- coral cat shark
- Ocellaris clownfish
- Bluespotted ribbontail ray
- Pristis microdon

Frogs

- Giant snapping frog
- Magnificent tree frog

Invertebrate

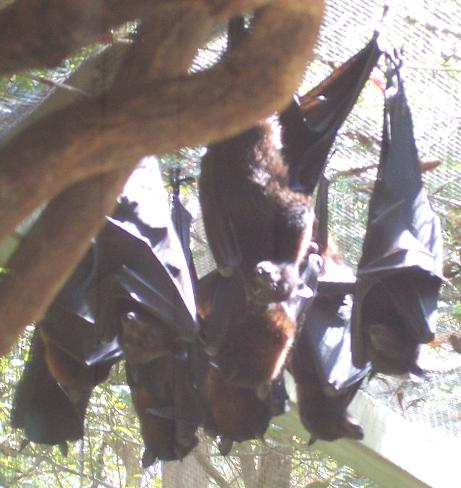
Black flying foxes at the park

- Flame-backed fiddler crab

Mammals

- Agile wallaby
- Antilopine kangaroo
- Bare-rumped sheathtail bat
- Black flying fox
- Black wallaroo
- Common planigale
- Dingo
- Ghost bat
- Golden bandicoot
- Grassland melomys
- Narbalek
- Northern brown bandicoot
- Northern brushtail possum
- Northern quoll
- Rakali
- Rock ringtail possum
- Short-beaked echidna
- Short-eared rock-wallaby
- Spectacled hare-wallaby
- Stripe-faced dunnart
- Sugar glider

Reptiles

- Black-headed python
- Brown tree snake
- Children's python
- Darwin carpet python
- Estuarine crocodile
- Freshwater crocodile
- Frilled lizard
- Giant cave gecko
- Golden tree snake
- Hosmer's spiny-tailed skink
- King brown snake
- Merten's water monitor
- Northern blue-tongued skink
- Northern death adder
- Northern red-faced turtle
- Northern snake-necked turtle
- Northern snapping turtle
- Northern spiny-tailed gecko
- Northern yellow-faced turtle
- Olive python
- Pig-nosed turtle
- Rough knob-tailed gecko
- Water python
- Western brown snake
- Green Tree Python

== See also ==
- List of zoos in Australia
