= Red-bellied turtle =

Red-bellied turtle can refer to several turtle species:

- Pseudemys alabamensis, the Alabama red-bellied turtle
- Pseudemys nelsoni, the Florida red-bellied turtle
- Pseudemys rubriventris, the Northern red-bellied turtle
- Red-bellied short-necked turtle, a species of turtle in the family Chelidae found in tropical Australia and Papua New Guinea

== See also ==
- Red-eared turtle
- Red turtle (disambiguation)
