= Wallaroo =

Category of marsupial

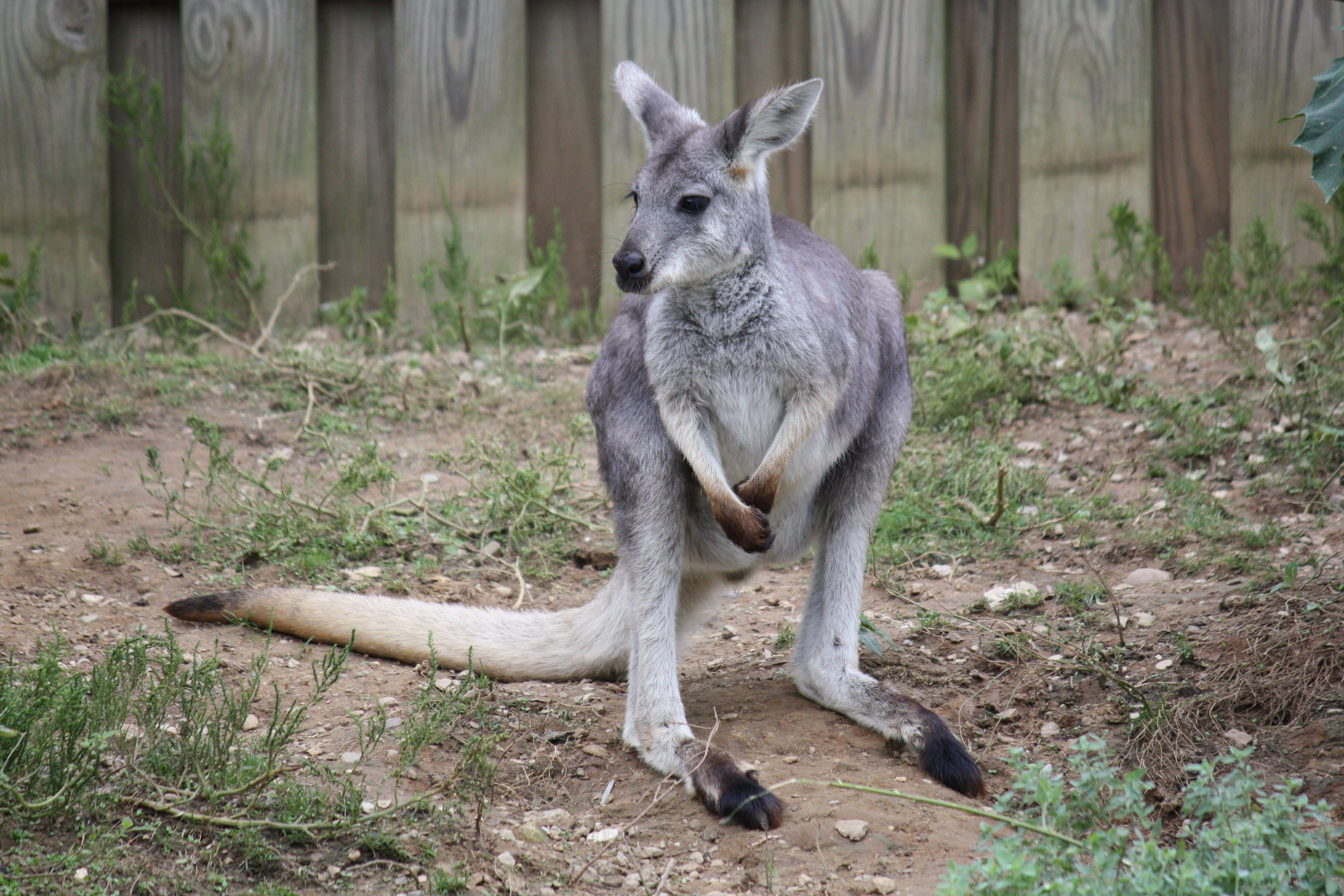
Common wallaroo Osphranter robustus at Louisville Zoo

Wallaroo /wɒləˈruː/ is a common name for several species of moderately large macropods, intermediate in size between the kangaroos and the wallabies, that are native to Australia and Papua New Guinea. The word "wallaroo" is from the Dharug walaru with spelling influenced by the words "kangaroo" and "wallaby".

== Description ==
Wallaroos are typically distinct species from kangaroos and wallabies. An exception is the antilopine wallaroo, which is commonly known as an antilopine kangaroo when large, an antilopine wallaby when small, or an antilopine wallaroo when of intermediate size.

== Species ==
Wallaroo may refer to one of several species in the genus Osphranter:

- The common wallaroo or wallaroo (Osphranter robustus) is the best-known species. There are four subspecies of the common wallaroo: the eastern wallaroo (O. r. robustus) and the euro (O. r. erubescens), which are both widespread, and two of more restricted range, one from Barrow Island (the Barrow Island wallaroo (O. r. isabellinus)), the other from the Kimberley region (the Kimberley wallaroo (O. r. woodwardi)).
- The black wallaroo (O. bernardus) occupies an area of steep, rocky ground in Arnhem Land. At around 60 to 70 cm (24 to 28 inches) in length (excluding tail) it is the smallest wallaroo and the most heavily built. Males weigh 19 to 22 kg (42 to 49 lb), females about 13 kg (29 lb). Because it is very wary and is found only in a small area of remote and very rugged country, it is little-known.
- The antilopine wallaroo (O. antilopinus), also known as the antilopine kangaroo or the antilopine wallaby, is a creature of the grassy plains and woodlands and is gregarious, unlike other wallaroos which are solitary.

== Emblems and popular culture ==
The common wallaroo was used for the name and cap emblem of Wallaroo FC, Australia's first rugby union football club founded in Sydney in 1870. The Australian national women's rugby union team was in 1994 named 'The Wallaroos'.

The famous 1770 kangaroo sketches drawn by botanical illustrator Sydney Parkinson during Captain James Cook and Joseph Banks' HMS Endeavour voyage were determined to be an eastern wallaroo (O. r. robustus) following a 1970 study by Australian zoologist Geoffrey Sharman. The 1772 oil paintingThe Kongouro from New Holland by George Stubbs appears to be based on the Parkinson drawings.

The port town of Wallaroo at Wallaroo Bay in South Australia shares the same spelling, but derives its name independently from a local Narungga Aboriginal phrase and not the marsupial. The Royal Navy cruiser HMS Wallaroo (1890) and the Royal Australian Navy corvette HMAS Wallaroo (1942) were named after the town.
