= Mugilogobius chulae =

Conservation status
- Least Concern (IUCN 3.1)

Scientific classification
- Kingdom: Animalia
- Phylum: Chordata
- Class: Actinopterygii
- Order: Gobiiformes
- Family: Oxudercidae
- Genus: Mugilogobius
- Species: M. chulae

Binomial name
- Mugilogobius chulae (H. M. Smith, 1932)

Synonyms
- Tamanka sinensis Herre, 1935; Vaimosa valigouva Deraniyagala, 1936; Vaimosa zebra Aurich, 1938; Mugilogobius zebra (Aurich, 1938

Species of fish

Mugilogobius chulae, commonly known as the yellowstripe goby or Chulae's goby, is a species of freshwater, brackish goby, where it feeds on small crustaceans, aquatic insects and insect larvae. It is found in coastal eastern Asia from the Ryukyu Islands south to Sumatra.

== Etymology ==
The Yellowstripe goby was described by Hugh McCormick Smith in 1932 and named after Luang Chula Cachanagupta who was Director of the Department of Fisheries of Siam (Thailand), from where the species was described.

When grown to a length of about 3.5–4 cm (1.4–1.6 in), the male has longer fins and a brighter color than the female. Usually found in brackish water areas with dense aquatic plants.

It is popular as an ornamental fish like a case of Queen of Siam goby (M. rambaiae), but it is also rare.
