= Choanocotyle elegans =

Scientific classification
- Kingdom: Animalia
- Phylum: Platyhelminthes
- Class: Trematoda
- Order: Plagiorchiida
- Family: Choanocotylidae
- Genus: Choanocotyle
- Species: C. elegans

Binomial name
- Choanocotyle elegans Jue Sue, 1998

Species of fluke

Choanocotyle elegans is a species of flatworms in the family Choanocotylidae. It infects Australian freshwater turtles. It was described from the small intestine of Chelodina expansa and Emydura macquarii.
