= Red turtle =

Red turtle may refer to:

- Red side-necked turtle, a species of turtle found in Colombia and possibly Peru and Brazil.
- Red-eared slider, the most popular pet turtle species in the United States and a popular pet turtle around the world.
- Red-faced turtle, a turtle found across much of northern Australia.
- Painted turtle, the most widespread native turtle of North America. Can have a red line on the top shell or a red pattern on the bottom shell.
- Red-crowned roofed turtle
- Red-necked pond turtle
- Red-bellied short-necked turtle
- Red-headed Amazon River turtle
- Pseudemys, a turtle genus, known as cooters with several red-bellied turtle species.
  - Alabama red-bellied cooter
  - Florida red-bellied cooter
  - Northern red-bellied cooter
- The Red Turtle, 2016 animated film

== See also ==
- Red-legged tortoise (disambiguation)
