= Choanocotyle =

Scientific classification
- Kingdom: Animalia
- Phylum: Platyhelminthes
- Class: Trematoda
- Order: Plagiorchiida
- Family: Choanocotylidae
- Genus: Choanocotyle; Jue Sue, 1998

Species
- Choanocotyle elegans; Choanocotyle hobbsi; Choanocotyle juesuei; Choanocotyle nematoides; Choanocotyle platti

Genus of flukes

Choanocotyle is a genus of flatworms in the family Choanocotylidae. Species infect freshwater turtles.
