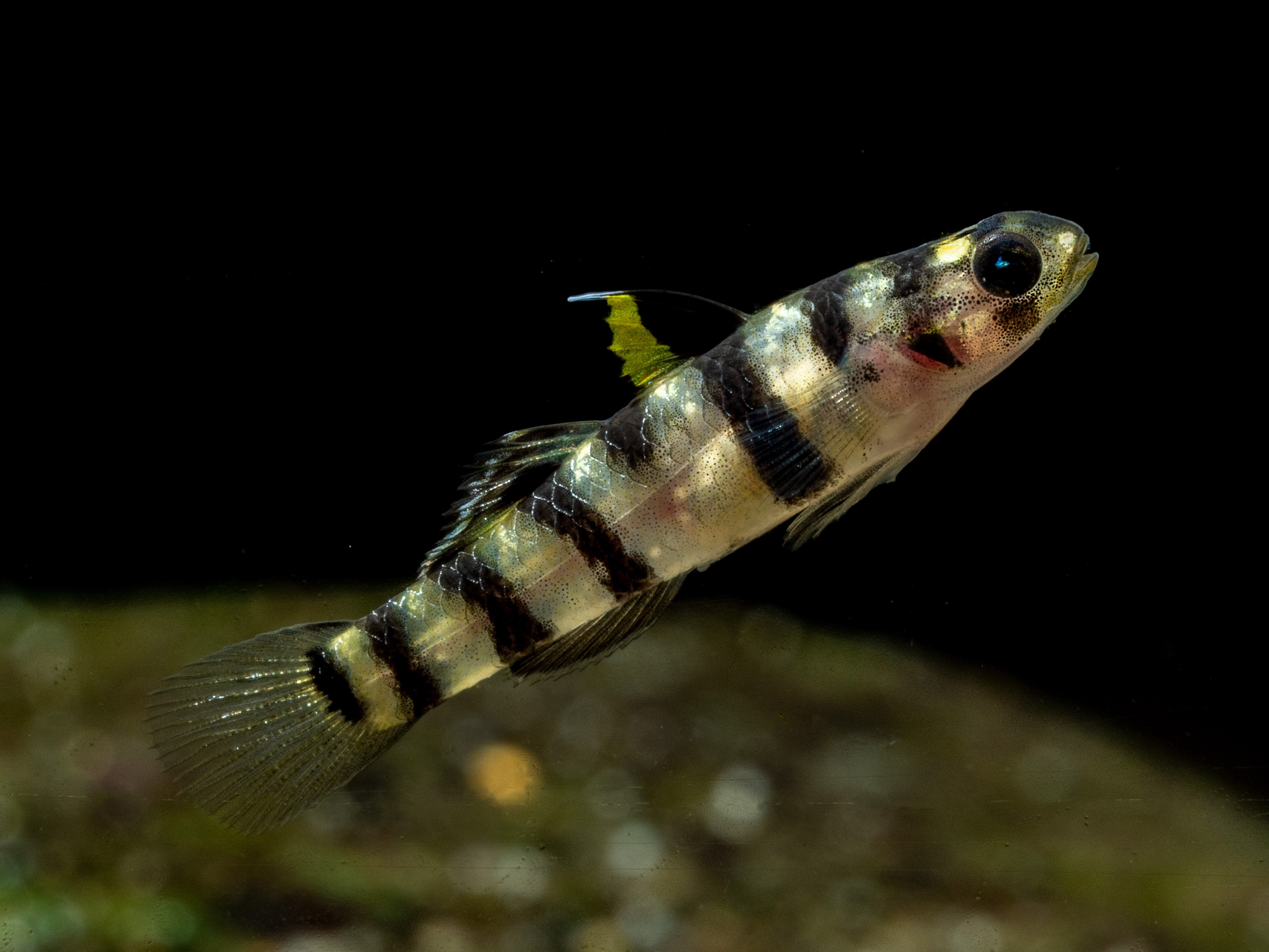

Scientific classification
- Kingdom: Animalia
- Phylum: Chordata
- Class: Actinopterygii
- Order: Gobiiformes
- Family: Oxudercidae
- Genus: Mugilogobius
- Species: M. tigrinus

Binomial name
- Mugilogobius tigrinus Larson, 2001

= Mugilogobius tigrinus =

Species of fish

Mugilogobius tigrinus is a small species of goby found in mangrove creeks and pools of south-eastern Asia.
