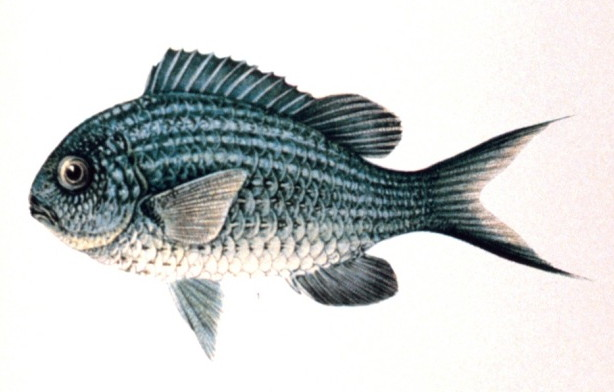

Scientific classification
- Domain: Eukaryota
- Kingdom: Animalia
- Phylum: Chordata
- Class: Actinopterygii
- Order: Blenniiformes
- Family: Pomacentridae
- Genus: Chromis
- Species: C. caerulea

Binomial name
- Chromis caerulea (Cuvier, 1830)

= Chromis caerulea =

Species of fish

Chromis caerulea, the blue puller, is a species of damselfish belonging to the family Chromis. This species is a close relative of Chromis viridis, which it is sometimes considered conspecific. It can be found in the Western Pacific Ocean in the Red Sea, Aldabra, Mozambique, Seychelles and Kenya. It inhabits lagoons, passages and outer reef slopes, feeding above rich beds of coral.
