= Mugilogobius adeia =

Conservation status
- Endangered (IUCN 3.1)

Scientific classification
- Kingdom: Animalia
- Phylum: Chordata
- Class: Actinopterygii
- Order: Gobiiformes
- Family: Oxudercidae
- Genus: Mugilogobius
- Species: M. adeia

Binomial name
- Mugilogobius adeia Larson & Kottelat, 1992

Species of fish

Mugilogobius adeia is a species of goby endemic to Lake Matano on the Indonesian island of Sulawesi where it inhabits areas with a number of shells of the gastropod Tylomelania gemmifera in which it seeks shelter. This species can reach a length of 4.3 centimetres (1.7 in) TL.
