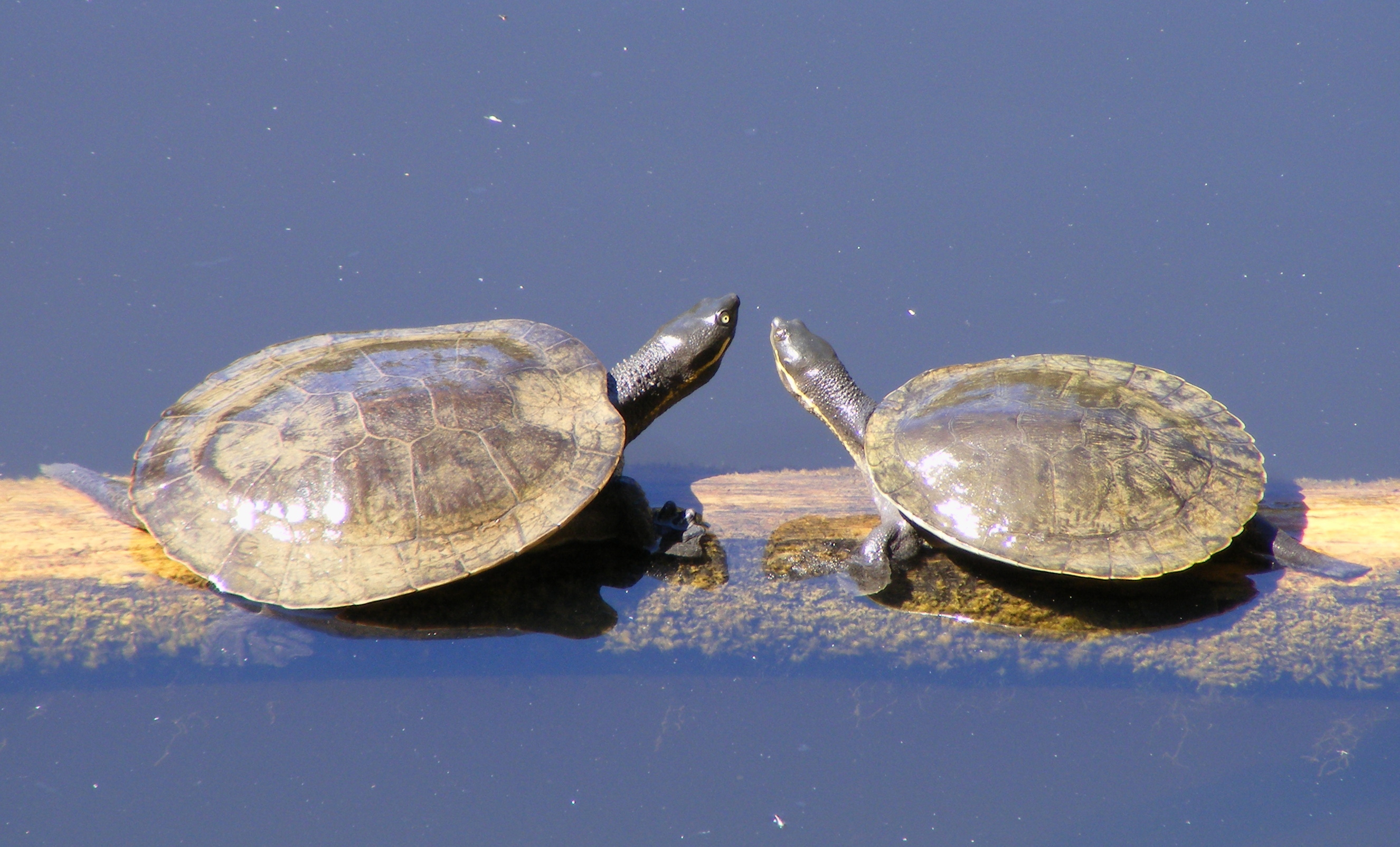
- Macquarie turtle Emydura macquarii

Scientific classification
- Kingdom: Animalia
- Phylum: Chordata
- Class: Reptilia
- Order: Testudines
- Suborder: Pleurodira
- Family: Chelidae
- Subfamily: Chelodininae
- Genus: Emydura; Bonaparte, 1836

Species
- 6, and see text

Synonyms
- Emydura Bonaparte 1836:7; Emydura Bonaparte 1836:7; Chelymys Gray 1844:42; Euchelymys Gray 1871:118; Tropicochelymys Wells and Wellington 1985:9

= Emydura =

Australian short-necked turtles

Genus of turtles

Emydura, also known commonly as the Australian short-necked turtles, is a genus of turtles in the family Chelidae. The genus was paraphyletic with Elseya. Consequently, it was split into two genera Myuchelys and Elseya by Thomson and Georges in 2009. Turtles of the genus Emydura can grow quite large, 30 cm (12 in) or more is not unusual, and have a life span of around 20–30 years. They generally do not hibernate as their warmer climate lets them remain active all year round; they also spend more time in the water than other turtles. They are considered omnivorous but rely on a constant supply of meat to remain healthy, feeding on basically anything that will fit into their mouth. They are characterised by a white stripe starting at the nose and leading down the neck, as well as a more ridged shell. In Australia, the public require a basic reptiles licence to purchase these turtles; taking from the wild is strictly prohibited.

== Species ==
Species and notable subspecies arranged according to most recent review of Georges & Thomson, 2010 with some modification after Kehlmaier et al. 2019 are:

- Northern red-faced turtle, Emydura australis, (Gray, 1841)
- Emydura gunaleni, Smales, McCord, Cann, & Joseph-Ouni, 2019
- Macquarie turtle, Emydura macquarii, (Gray, 1830)
  - Murray river turtle, Emydura macquarii macquarii
  - Krefft's turtle, Emydura macquarii krefftii
  - Fraser island short-neck turtle, Emydura macquarii nigra
  - Cooper creek turtle, Emydura macquarii emmotti
- Red-bellied short-necked turtle or Jardine River Turtle, Emydura subglobosa, (Krefft 1876)
  - Red-bellied short-necked turtle, Emydura subglobosa subglobosa
  - Worrell's short-necked turtle, Emydura subglobosa worrelli
- Northern yellow-faced turtle, Emydura tanybaraga, Cann, 1997
- Victoria river red-faced turtle, Emydura victoriae, (Gray 1841)
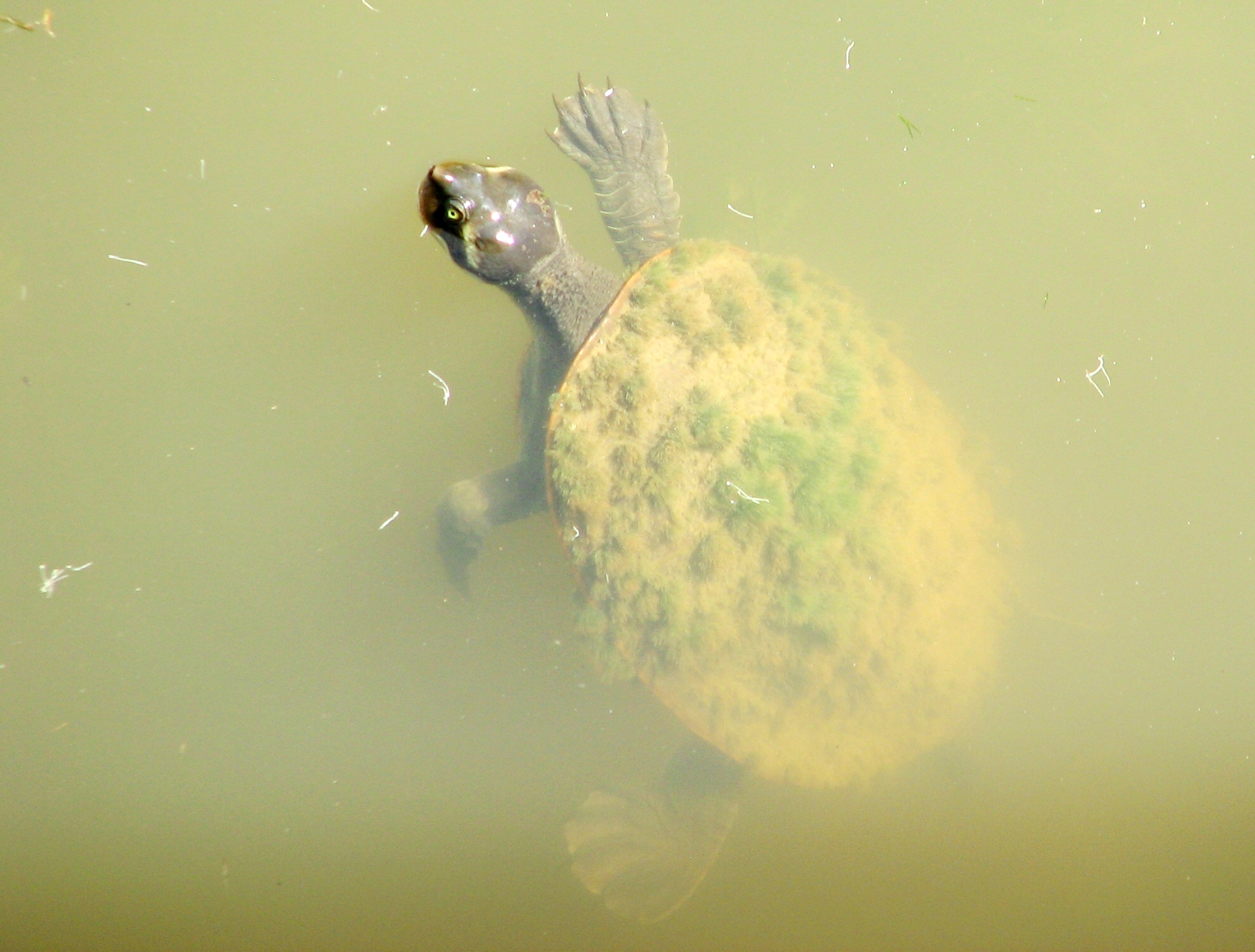
Kreftt's river turtle
