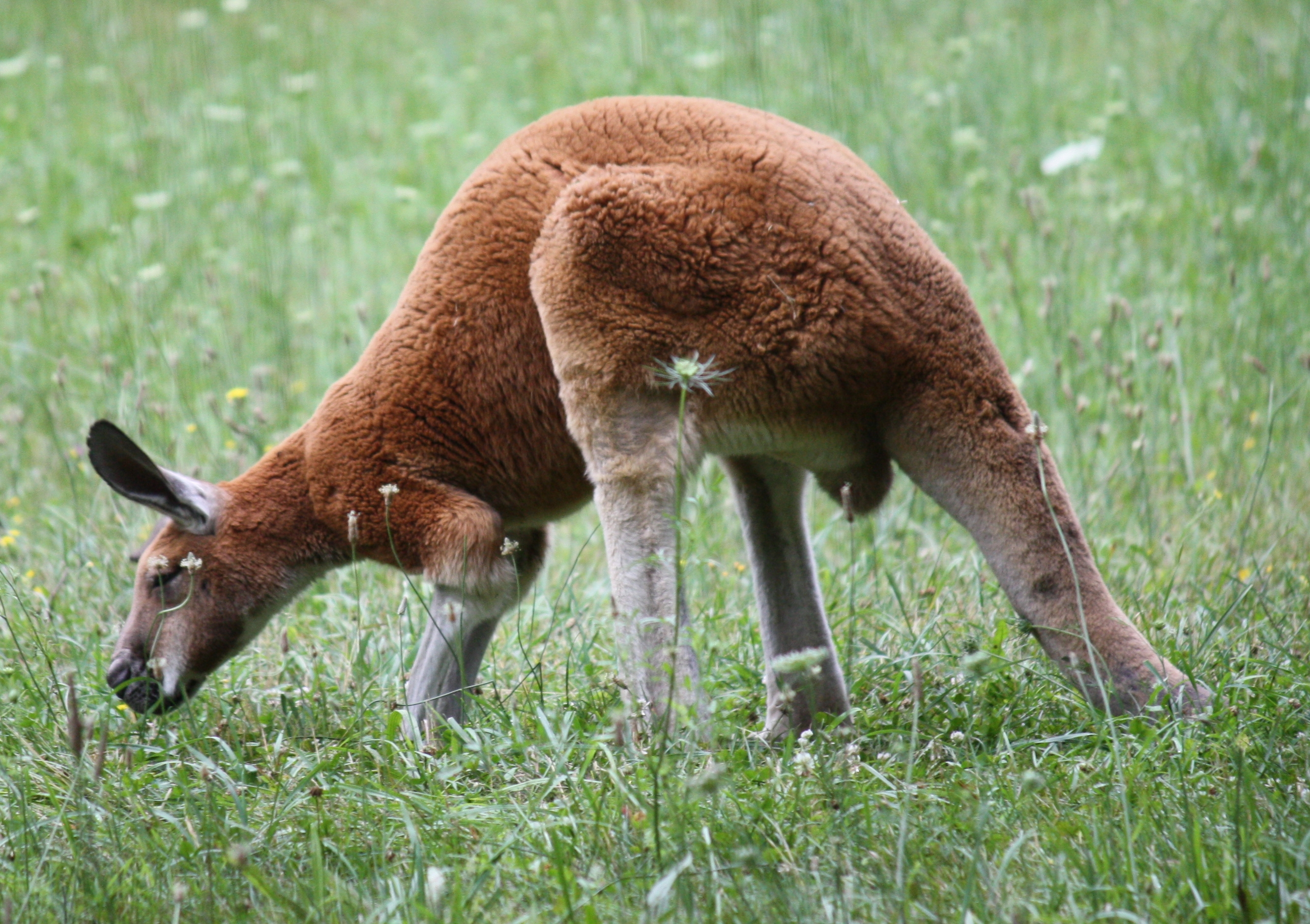
- Red kangaroo

Scientific classification
- Domain: Eukaryota
- Kingdom: Animalia
- Phylum: Chordata
- Class: Mammalia
- Infraclass: Marsupialia
- Order: Diprotodontia
- Family: Macropodidae
- Genus: Osphranter; Gould, 1842

Type species
- Osphranter antilopinus Gould, 1842

= Osphranter =

Genus of marsupials

Osphranter is a genus of large marsupials in the family Macropodidae, commonly known as kangaroos and wallaroos (among other species). It contains the largest extant marsupial, the red kangaroo (O. rufus).

In 2019, a reassessment of macropod taxonomy determined that Osphranter and Notamacropus, formerly considered subgenera of Macropus, should be moved to the genus level. This change was accepted by the Australian Faunal Directory in 2020.

The genus has a fossil record that extends back at least into the Pliocene.

== Species ==
Image	Scientific name	Distribution
	Osphranter antilopinus, antilopine kangaroo	
	Osphranter bernardus, black wallaroo	
	Osphranter robustus, common wallaroo	
	Osphranter rufus, red kangaroo	
