= Emydura gunaleni =

Scientific classification
- Kingdom: Animalia
- Phylum: Chordata
- Class: Reptilia
- Order: Testudines
- Suborder: Pleurodira
- Family: Chelidae
- Genus: Emydura
- Species: E. gunaleni

Binomial name
- Emydura gunaleni Smales, McCord, Cann & Joseph-Ouni, 2019

Species of New Guinea turtle

Emydura gunaleni is a species of Australasian short-necked turtle that is endemic to New Guinea. The specific epithet gunaleni honours Danny Gunalen, who was instrumental in recognising the distinctive nature of the species and in procuring specimens.

== Distribution ==
The species is found in Western New Guinea. The type locality for this species is located in the Kais River in the South Sorong Regency.
