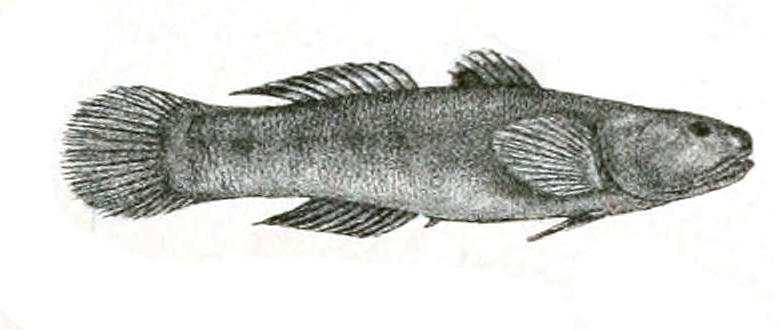

Scientific classification
- Domain: Eukaryota
- Kingdom: Animalia
- Phylum: Chordata
- Class: Actinopterygii
- Order: Gobiiformes
- Family: Oxudercidae
- Genus: Mugilogobius
- Species: M. platynotus

Binomial name
- Mugilogobius platynotus (Günther, 1861)

Synonyms
- Gobius platynotus Günther, 1861

= Mugilogobius platynotus =

Species of fish

Mugilogobius platynotus, commonly known as the flatback mangrove goby, is a species of goby native to eastern Australia.
