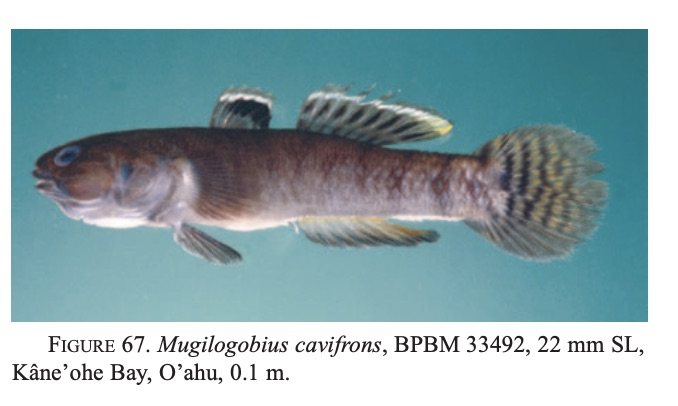

Conservation status
- Least Concern (IUCN 3.1)

Scientific classification
- Kingdom: Animalia
- Phylum: Chordata
- Class: Actinopterygii
- Order: Gobiiformes
- Family: Oxudercidae
- Genus: Mugilogobius
- Species: M. cavifrons

Binomial name
- Mugilogobius cavifrons (Weber, 1909)
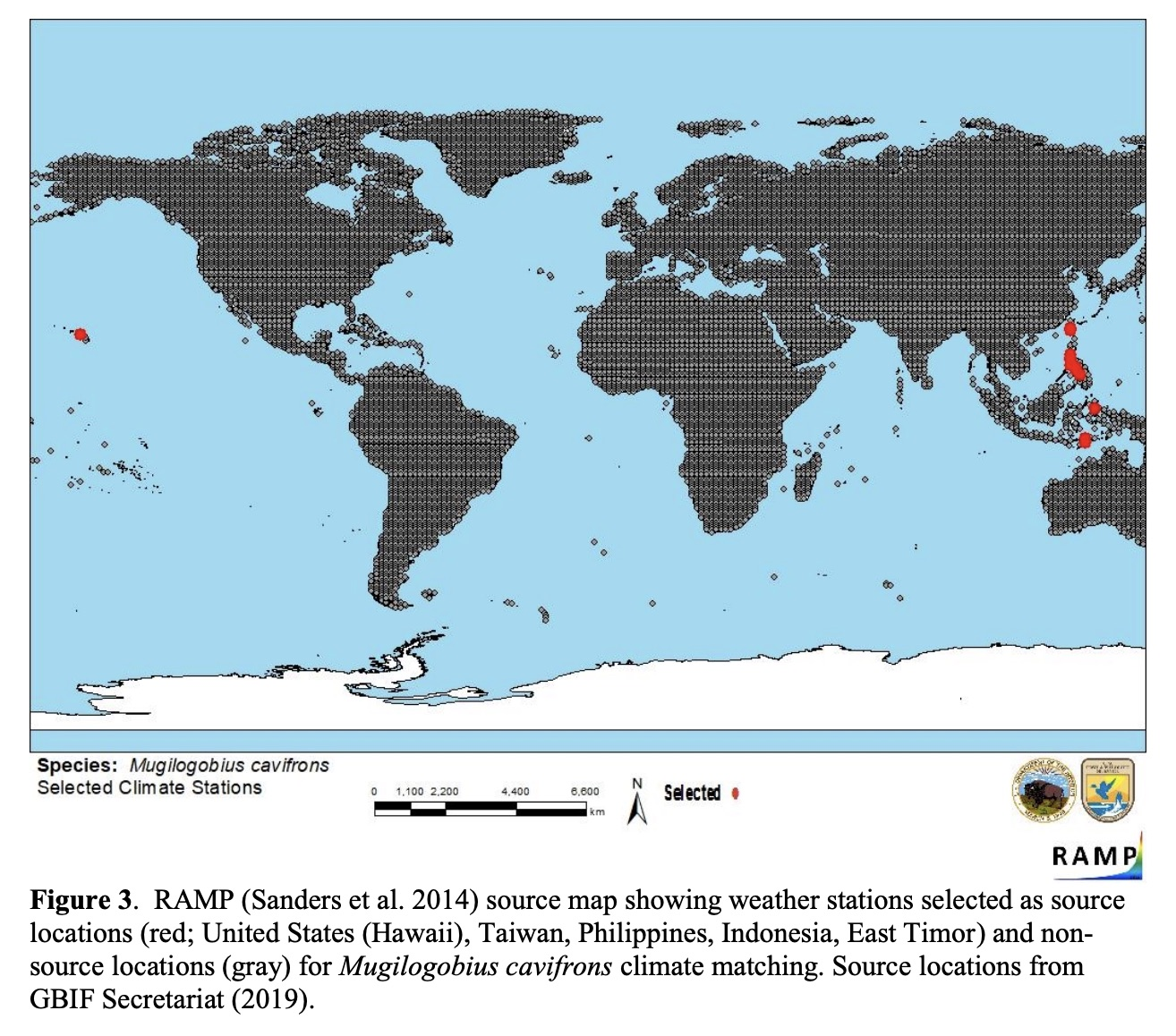
- World map indicating distribution of the Mangrove goby

Synonyms
- Gobius cavifrons Weber, 1909

= Mugilogobius cavifrons =

Species of ray-finned fish

Mugilogobius cavifrons, the mangrove goby, is a small benthic fish belonging to the family Gobiidae. It inhabits brackish and freshwater environments in tropical Indo-Pacific regions, particularly mangroves and estuaries. Originally described by Weber in 1909, the species is notable for its cryptic coloration and adaptability to disturbed habitats. It has also been introduced to the Hawaiian Islands, where it has established populations in estuarine system.

== Description ==
=== General appearance and size ===
The mangrove goby is a small benthic goby, with adults typically less than 50 mm (2.0 in) total length (TL) and a maximum recorded size of approximately 58 mm (2.3 in) TL. The body is relatively deep, with a body depth of about one-fifth of the standard length. The head is moderately broad and features small fleshy cirri on the interorbital region that extend onto the snout. The head and body are fully scaled, with scales reaching onto the top of the head and operculum, though the cheek remains unscaled. In many gobies, including the mangrove goby, the pelvic fins are joined to form a suction disc, which allows the fish to cling to surfaces and remain stable in moving water. The number of fin rays helps identify the species. The first top (dorsal) fin usually has 5 to 7 short spines followed by 7 or 8 soft rays. The bottom (anal) fin has 1 short spine and 7 or 8 soft rays, and the side (pectoral) fins typically have 15 or 16 rays.

=== Coloration and markings ===
The mangrove goby exhibits a tan to light brown background coloration overlaid with irregular dark markings. Distinct black lines extend from the snout to the eye and from the jaw to the underside margin of the eye. The body bears narrow, irregular dark bars, while the caudal fin shows four broken transverse black bands. The first dorsal fin has a black spot, and the second dorsal is dusky with darker patches. The ventral surface is lighter, often pale tan. This cryptic coloration provides camouflage against muddy and sandy substrates common in mangrove and estuarine habitats.

=== Juvenile vs. adult morphology ===
Juveniles resemble adults in general shape and patterning, although they are smaller and may display slightly paler coloration. No strong ontogenetic color changes are reported. Juveniles exhibit the same benthic, cryptic behavior as adults, aiding concealment from predators.

=== Similar species ===
M. cavifrons may be confused with other small gobies inhabiting mangrove and estuarine systems, such as Mugilogobius adeia or Mugilogobius notospilus. Distinguishing features include scale coverage on the top of the head and specific dorsal and anal fin-ray counts. These features are emphasized in taxonomic keys for Mugilogobius species.

=== Additional characteristics ===
In the Mugilogobius species, blood-filled capillaries in the exposed skin of the head indicate the use of cutaneous (skin) respiration during emersion. The presence of a buccal bubble for both respiration and buoyancy control suggests that air-gulping and aerial surface respiration were important evolutionary steps toward air-breathing in this group.

== Taxonomy ==
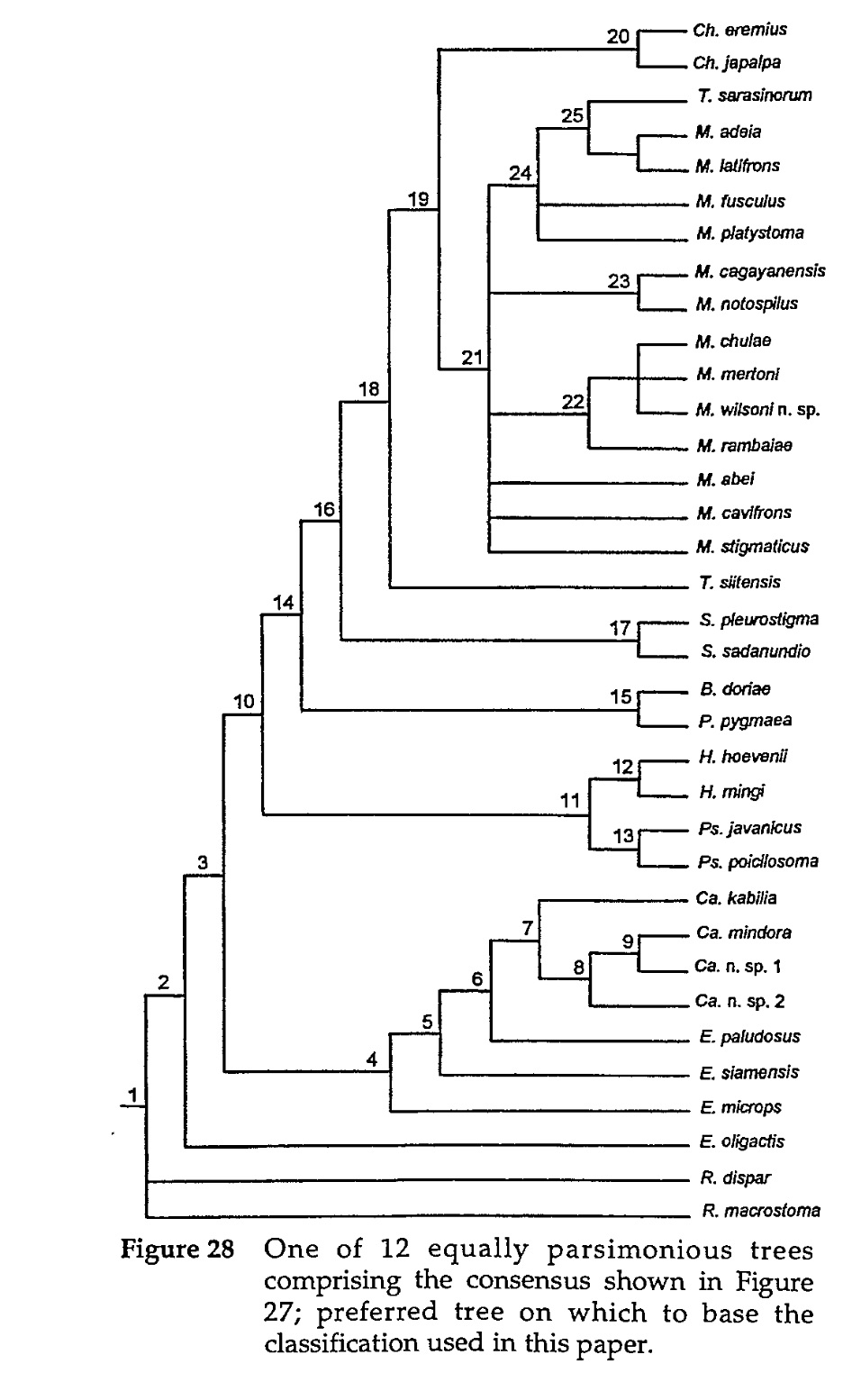
Parsimonious phylogeny containing species of the Gobiidae family

The species was first described by Max Carl Wilhelm Weber in 1909 from specimens collected near Ternate, Indonesia.

== Distribution ==
=== Native range ===
The native distribution of Mugilogobius cavifrons spans the tropical western Pacific, including Indonesia, Papua New Guinea, the Philippines, Taiwan, the Ryukyu Islands of southern Japan, Kosrae (Caroline Islands), Guam, and surrounding Indo-Pacific localities. The species primarily inhabits low-salinity coastal streams and mangrove estuaries within this range.

=== Introduced range ===
The mangrove goby has been introduced to the Hawaiian Islands, where it was first recorded in Pearl Harbor, Oʻahu, in 1987. Since its introduction, it has become established in several Oʻahu estuaries and streams on both windward and leeward coasts. It has not been confirmed on other Hawaiian islands. The probable introduction pathway is through ballast water discharge or hull fouling from ships, though early aquaculture-related transfers may also have contributed.

=== Habitat and environmental tolerances ===
Mugilogobius cavifrons inhabit brackish to freshwater systems, including mangrove forests, tidal creeks, estuarine pools, and shallow coastal streams. It is demersal, typically found resting or feeding on muddy or sandy substrates. Reported salinity tolerance ranges from 0 to 36 ppt, indicating broad osmotic adaptability. The species has been observed in disturbed and artificial habitats, including concrete drainage canals and modified estuaries in urbanized areas of Oʻahu.

=== Abundance ===
Field surveys in Oʻahu's estuaries indicate that M. cavifrons can be locally abundant and, in some cases, more numerous than native stream gobies such as Awaous guamensis, resulting in a disruption of this native species distribution. It has been found in as many or more sampling stations than native species, suggesting high population densities in established habitats. Quantitative density data vary among sites, but the species is generally considered common to abundant in lower estuarine reaches where it has become established.

== Behavior ==
=== Reproduction and spawning ===
A captive breeding study provided detailed observations of spawning behavior, embryonic development, and larval morphology. Spawning occurs during daylight, most commonly between 14:00 and 16:00 hours. Females deposit demersal, adhesive eggs that attach singly or in a single layer to substrate surfaces such as PVC pipes in captivity or to natural substrates in the wild. Eggs measure approximately 1.16–1.39 × 0.50–0.57 mm and have attached filaments. Fecundity (ability to produce offspring) ranges from 1,000 to over 7,000 eggs per spawn, and spawning intervals range from 2–9 days. Males guard and aerate the eggs until hatching, providing parental care typical of gobiids. Under captive conditions, hatching occurred approximately 60 hours after fertilization.

=== Age and growth ===
No published otolith or scale-aging studies are available for this species, and long-term growth data from wild populations are lacking. Captive observations describe larval development through metamorphosis but do not provide lifespan estimates.

=== Diet and feeding ===
Mugilogobius cavifrons is a benthic carnivore, feeding on small invertebrates and fish. In Hawaiian populations, stomach content analyses revealed a diet consisting primarily of ostracods, chironomid larvae, small crustaceans, and juvenile fishes. In aquaria, the species aggressively preys upon smaller fish, including post-larval stages of native gobies. Its feeding strategy involves ambush predation from the substrate, taking advantage of cryptic coloration to approach prey undetected.

=== Dispersal ===
The species exhibits benthic and cryptic behavior, typically remaining close to the substrate and retreating into mud, vegetation, or under debris when disturbed. It shows limited climbing ability and cannot traverse vertical barriers such as waterfalls, which constrains upstream dispersal. Dispersal between estuaries is most likely facilitated by human activity rather than natural larval transport.

=== Parasites and disease ===
No major parasites or diseases of M. cavifrons have been documented in the scientific literature. There are no reports of significant pathogenic infestations in M. cavifrons.

== Fisheries and human use ==
The mangrove goby has no known commercial or recreational fishery value. It is not a common aquarium species and has no documented use in subsistence fisheries in its native or introduced ranges.

=== Cultural significance ===
There are no published studies documenting the cultural uses or significance of Mugilogobius cavifrons specifically; discussion of cultural importance tends to focus on other goby species (e.g., native Hawaiian 'o'opu) that helped facilitate the fertilization and upkeep of freshwater taro fishponds.

== Conservation status ==
=== Population trends ===
Globally, M. cavifrons is not listed as threatened and is not included among species of conservation concern by the International Union for Conservation of Nature. Regional inventories describe it as locally common in suitable habitats throughout its range. In Hawaiʻi, the species is considered nonindigenous but established. It coexists with native gobies, though its presence correlates with reduced native goby abundance in some systems. However, evidence for widespread population declines directly attributable to M. cavifrons remains inconclusive.

=== Threats to the species ===
The mangrove goby, as with other fish species in mangrove/estuarine ecosystems, may face mangrove loss, habitat fragmentation, estuarine mouth modification, and urbanization, which will threaten their habitat and therefore their species populations.

=== Threats posed as an introduced species ===
In Hawaiʻi, M. cavifrons is considered a potential ecological threat due to predation on native fishes and competition for habitat. It preys upon juvenile native gobies and small crustaceans, potentially disrupting recruitment of native species. Surveys in Oʻahu indicate that M. cavifrons can outnumber Awaous guamensis in shared habitats, suggesting competitive displacement in certain estuarine reaches. Despite these observations, evidence for ecosystem-wide impacts remains limited, and long-term ecological effects are still under study. The U.S. Fish and Wildlife Service's Ecological Risk Screening Summary (ERSS) notes moderate invasion risk and recommends further research on long-term impacts and interactions with native species.

=== Management and mitigation ===
There are currently no targeted eradication or control programs for M. cavifrons in Hawaiʻi. Current management efforts are focused on preventing further introductions through ballast water regulations, hull fouling controls, and aquaculture screening. Local monitoring programs continue to track the species' spread in Oʻahu estuaries. Its inability to pass waterfalls may limit upstream expansion in some watersheds, providing a natural containment mechanism.
