= Red-legged tortoise =

Red-legged tortoise may refer to:

- Red-footed tortoise, a tortoise native to South America.
- Wood turtle, a North America turtle.

== See also ==
- Red turtle (disambiguation)
