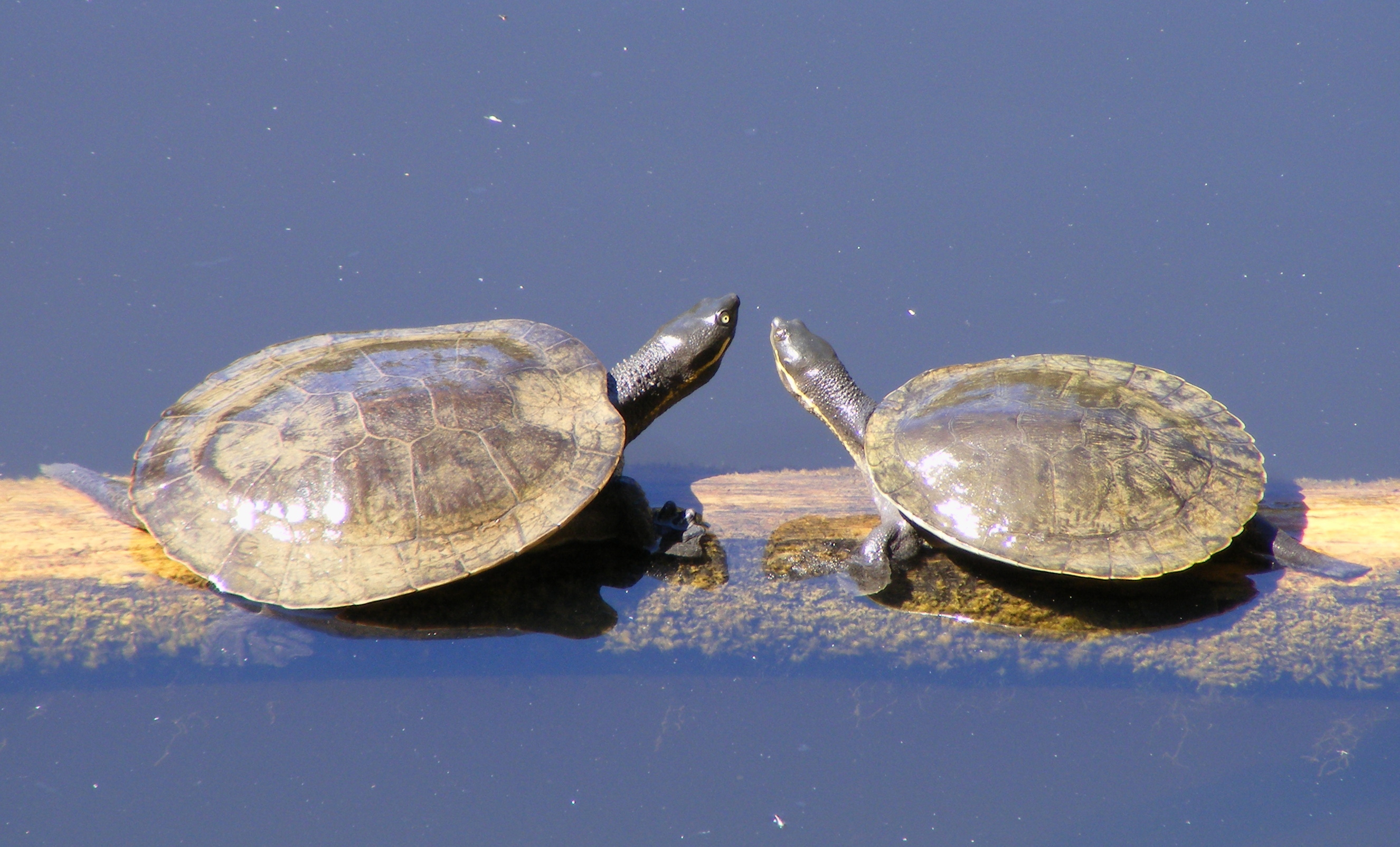
- Macquarie turtle Emydura macquarii

Conservation status
- Least Concern (IUCN 2.3)

Scientific classification
- Kingdom: Animalia
- Phylum: Chordata
- Class: Reptilia
- Order: Testudines
- Suborder: Pleurodira
- Family: Chelidae
- Genus: Emydura
- Species: E. macquarii

Binomial name
- Emydura macquarii (Gray, 1830)

Subspecies
- E. m. macquarrii (Gray, 1830); E. m. krefftii (Gray, 1871); E. m. gunabarra (Cann, 1998); E. m. nigra (McCord et al., 2003); E. m. emmotti (Cann et al., 2003)

Synonyms
- E. m. macquarii (Gray 1830): Emys macquaria Cuvier 1829:11 (nomen nudum); Chelys (Hydraspis) macquarii Gray 1830:15; Hydraspis macquarrii Gray 1831:40 (nomen novum); Platemys macquaria A.M.C. Duméril & Bibron 1835:438 (nomen novum); Hydraspis australis Gray 1841:445 (10:41) (nomen dubium); Euchelymys sulcifera Gray 1871a:118; Emydura macquariae Boulenger 1889:ix (nomen novum); Emydura macquarii signata; Emydura signata Ahl 1932:127; Emydura canni Worrell 1970:pl.6 (nomen nudum); Chelymys cooki Wells & Wellington 1985:8 (nomen nudum); Chelymys johncanni Wells & Wellington 1985:8 (nomen nudum); Emydura macquarii binjing Cann 1998:116; Emydura macquarii dharra Cann 1998:120; Emydura macquarii gunabarra Cann 1998:123; Emydura macquarii dharuk Cann 1998:126; E. m. emmotti Cann, McCord & Joseph-Ouni in Mc-Cord, Cann & Joseph-Ouni 2003: Chelymys windorah Wells & Wellington 1985:8 (nomen nudum); Emydura macquarii emmotti Cann, McCord & Joseph-Ouni in McCord, Cann & Joseph-Ouni 2003:59; E. m. krefftii (Gray 1871): Chelymys krefftii Gray 1871b:366; Chelymys victoriae marmorata Gray 1872d:506; Chelymys victoriae sulcata Gray 1872d:506; E. m. nigra McCord, Cann & Joseph-Ouni 2003: Tropicochelymys insularis Wells & Wellington 1985:9 (nomen nudum); Emydura macquarii nigra McCord, Cann & Joseph-Ouni 2003:59

= Emydura macquarii =

Emydura macquarii Temporal range: Eocene–Recent

Species of turtle

Emydura macquarii, also known as the Murray River turtle, Macquarie River turtle, eastern short-necked turtle, eastern short-neck turtle, and southern river turtle, is a species of freshwater turtle in the family Chelidae. Named after the Macquarie River of New South Wales, the turtle is a wide-ranging species that occurs throughout many of the rivers of the eastern half of Australia.

== Etymology and taxonomy ==
The generic name, Emydura, is derived from the Greek emys (freshwater turtle) and the Greek oura (tail), Latinized to ura. Its grammatical gender is feminine. The specific epithet, macquarii, refers to the turtle's type locality: the Macquarie River. It would seem that the species was not named after Governor Lachlan Macquarie, for whom the river is named.

The species' common names include Murray River turtle, Macquarie River turtle, eastern short-necked turtle, eastern short-neck turtle, and southern river turtle.

The subspecific name, emmotti, is in honour of Australian farmer and naturalist Angus Emmott (born 1962).

The subspecific name, krefftii, is in honour of German-born Australian naturalist Gerard Krefft.

A species formerly thought to be a separate species, the Bellinger River Emydura is now considered synonymous with the Macquarie River turtle.

The species Emydura macquarii is in the family Chelidae.

== Collection history and discovery ==
This species, Emydura macquarii, has a long and complicated nomenclatural history, including even its original description. The holotype was originally collected by René Primevère Lesson (1794–1849) and Prosper Garnot (1794–1838) in 1824. During an expedition on the La Coquille, captained by Louis Isidore Duperrey, which visited Sydney, Australia, from 17 January to 25 March 1824, they visited Bathurst, and collected the holotype from the Macquarie River.

The first description of the species, as Emys macquaria, was offered by Baron Georges Cuvier in 1829, but this description is nowadays seen as a nomen nudum. Hence, the description, as Chelys (Hydraspis) macquarii, by John Edward Gray in 1830, is considered the valid description.

== Geographic range ==
Emydura macquarii is found across several states:

- in the coastal Queensland rivers and the Cooper Creek ecosystem, along with Fraser Island and Brisbane
- in the Macquarie River basin and all its major tributaries, along with a number of coastal rivers up the New South Wales coast
- in northern Victoria
- in South Australia, in the billabongs and channels of Cooper Creek, and also along the Murray River; also, introduced populations in the Adelaide city area

== Description and habitat ==
The Macquarie River turtle is almost entirely aquatic. Its intergular plate reaches the front edge of the shell, while its plastrons are "cut away", allowing their legs to move freely and thus swim powerfully.

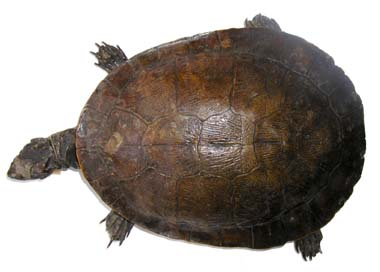
Emydura macquarii holotype: MNHN 9409, dorsal view

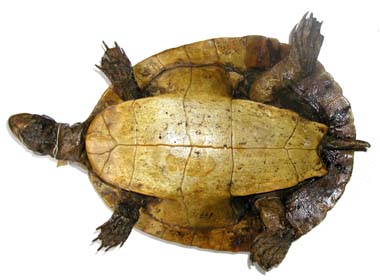
Emydura macquarii holotype: MNHN 9409, ventral view

== Feeding ==
The Macquarie River turtle is omnivorous. Its diet includes small crustaceans, aquatic insects, filamentous algae, and possibly aquatic weeds.

== Life cycle and sex determination ==
The Macquarie River turtle nests from October to early January, and multiple clutches of eggs may be laid, in nests excavated in the riverbanks.

Emydura macquarii uses the XY sex-determination system, making it one of the few turtle species that has a genetic sex-determination mechanism. The X and Y chromosomes are macrochromosomes, unlike most genetically sex-determined turtles including its close relative Chelodina longicollis, which has microchromosomes. It is also hypothesised that this turtle's sex chromosomes were formed from the translocation of an ancestral Y microchromosome onto an autosome. It can often be difficult to determine the gender of a turtle when it is young, but it becomes more apparent when it grows.

== Importance ==
Turtles are an important element of the river ecosystem owing to their feeding on dead fish after a fish kill event, returning ammonia and dissolved oxygen to the river much faster than by natural decomposition (3–6 days vs 25–27 days).

== Conservation status and efforts ==
Threats to the turtles' habitat include water pollution and increased sediment loads from nearby agriculture and forestry activities, construction of bridges and fords, extraction of river sand and gravel, clearing and degradation of riparian vegetation, water diversion, and changes to river flows. Foxes (an introduced species in Australia) and goannas may eat the eggs, and foxes may eat the turtles as well. In South Australia, river system regulation and roadkill are also considered threats to the species.

Efforts to protect the species include the use of professional shooters to kill foxes; working with local councils to build nesting islands, and improving monitoring of species.

Emydura macquarii is listed as "vulnerable" in the state of South Australia under relevant state legislation. After it was found that freshwater turtle numbers had declined by up to 91 per cent some sections of the Murray, conservation efforts increased, with the Government of South Australia allocating $450,000 to help establish the state's first turtle management plan, dubbed the "Together Understanding and Restoring Turtles in our Landscapes and Ecosystems" (TURTLE) project. A management strategy is being developed in collaboration with First Nations people, for whom the turtles have great cultural significance, along with environmental experts.

== Parasites ==
Emydura macquarii is often infected with the flatworm Choanocotyle elegans.
