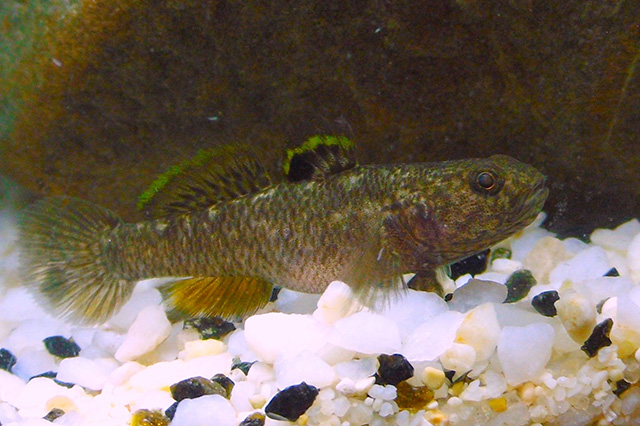

Conservation status
- Endangered (IUCN 3.1)

Scientific classification
- Kingdom: Animalia
- Phylum: Chordata
- Class: Actinopterygii
- Order: Gobiiformes
- Family: Oxudercidae
- Genus: Mugilogobius
- Species: M. latifrons

Binomial name
- Mugilogobius latifrons (Boulenger, 1897)

Synonyms
- Gobius latifrons Boulenger, 1897; Tamanka latifrons (Boulenger, 1897); Vaimosa latifrons (Boulenger, 1897)

= Mugilogobius latifrons =

Species of fish

Mugilogobius latifrons is a species of goby endemic to the Malili Lake system (consisting of Matano, Towuti and smaller lakes) in central Sulawesi, Indonesia generally being found in extremely shallow waters. This species can reach a length of 4.7 centimetres (1.9 in) TL.
