= Mugilogobius amadi =

Conservation status
- Critically Endangered (IUCN 3.1)

Scientific classification
- Kingdom: Animalia
- Phylum: Chordata
- Class: Actinopterygii
- Order: Gobiiformes
- Family: Oxudercidae
- Genus: Mugilogobius
- Species: M. amadi

Binomial name
- Mugilogobius amadi (Weber, 1913)

Synonyms
- Weberogobius amadi

Species of fish

Mugilogobius amadi, the poso bungu, is a critically endangered (possibly extinct) species of fish in the family Gobiidae. It is endemic to Lake Poso in Sulawesi, Indonesia. Although sometimes placed in its own genus Weberogobius, recent authorities often include it in Mugilogobius.
