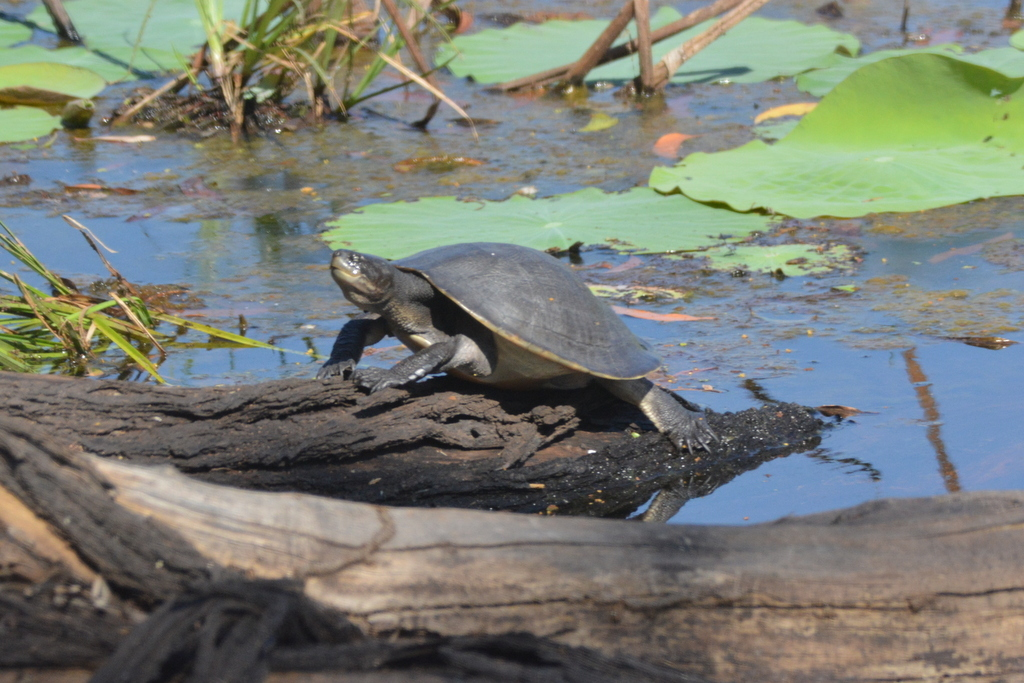

Conservation status
- Least Concern (IUCN 2.3)

Scientific classification
- Kingdom: Animalia
- Phylum: Chordata
- Class: Reptilia
- Order: Testudines
- Suborder: Pleurodira
- Family: Chelidae
- Genus: Emydura
- Species: E. tanybaraga

Binomial name
- Emydura tanybaraga Cann, 1997

Synonyms
- Emydura tanybaraga Cann, 1997

= Northern yellow-faced turtle =

Yellow-faced turtle

Species of turtle

The northern yellow-faced turtle (Emydura tanybaraga) is a species of medium-sized aquatic turtle in the family Chelidae. It inhabits slow-flowing rivers, streams, billabongs and paperbark swamps across much of northern Australia.

== Description ==
E. tanybaraga has a great morphological variation between different locations; adults are very similar in appearance to E. subglobosa.

A light yellow band runs from the eye to just above the tympanum. Another band extends from the angle of the mouth along the neck. The eye has dark markings through the iris at the level of the pupil.

The carapace of juveniles is pear-shaped and becomes oval in adults. It is light brown to dark brown in color, with a yellow or white rim. The posterior rim is smooth, without serrations. The longest carapace recorded is 285 mm. The plastron is tapered towards the rear with lobes at both ends turned up making the adult turtle look deeper. It is bone colored, occasionally with traces of pink.

The color of the dorsal skin is gray, and the ventral skin is creamy white or yellow in juveniles. As with other species of Emydura, the neck is covered with small smooth tubercles. Two barbels are sometimes found on the chin.
