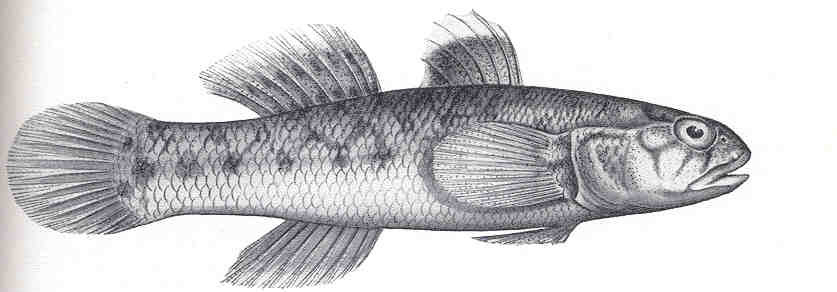

Scientific classification
- Domain: Eukaryota
- Kingdom: Animalia
- Phylum: Chordata
- Class: Actinopterygii
- Order: Gobiiformes
- Family: Oxudercidae
- Genus: Mugilogobius
- Species: M. stigmaticus

Binomial name
- Mugilogobius stigmaticus De Vis, 1884

= Mugilogobius stigmaticus =

Species of fish

Mugilogobius stigmaticus, commonly known as blackspot mangrove goby, is a species of goby native to the waters of eastern Australia.
