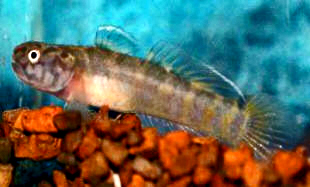

Conservation status
- Least Concern (IUCN 3.1)

Scientific classification
- Kingdom: Animalia
- Phylum: Chordata
- Class: Actinopterygii
- Order: Gobiiformes
- Family: Oxudercidae
- Genus: Mugilogobius
- Species: M. rambaiae

Binomial name
- Mugilogobius rambaiae (H. M. Smith, 1945)

Synonyms
- Vaimosa rambaiae H.M. Smith, 1945

= Mugilogobius rambaiae =

Species of fish

Mugilogobius rambaiae, commonly known as the Queen of Siam goby, is a species of freshwater goby from Sri Lanka and South-east Asia to New Guinea. It occurs in freshwater or the very low salinities of inner estuaries, and also in areas where Nypa fruticans grows. This species moves up rivers in the rainy season.

Its species name rambaiae is named in honour of Queen Rambai Barni, who was the wife and Queen Consort of King Prajadhipok (Rama VII) of Siam. It was first discovered in a khlong (canal) in Bangkok near the Chao Phraya Delta in 1945 by H.M. Smith.
