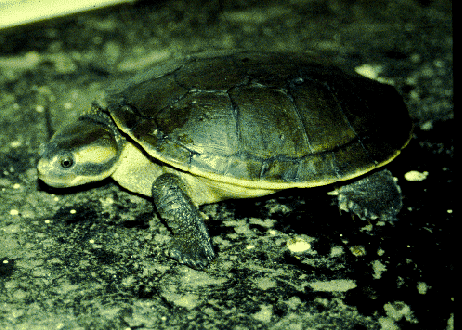

Scientific classification
- Kingdom: Animalia
- Phylum: Chordata
- Order: Testudines
- Suborder: Pleurodira
- Family: Chelidae
- Genus: Emydura
- Species: E. australis

Binomial name
- Emydura australis (Gray, 1841)

Synonyms
- Hydraspis australis

= Emydura australis =

Species of turtle

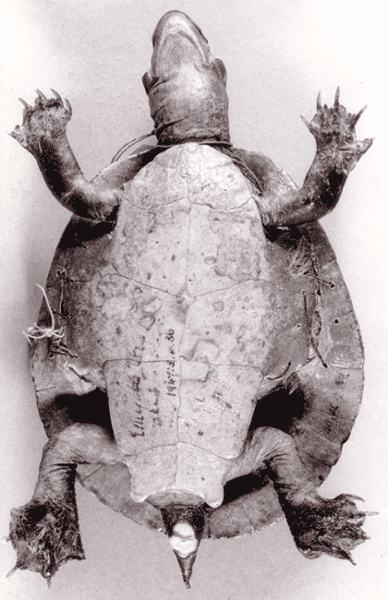
Ventral view of the holotype of Emydura australis, Natural History Museum

Emydura australis, the northern red-faced turtle, is a medium-sized aquatic turtle inhabiting rivers, streams and permanent water bodies across much of northern Australia.
