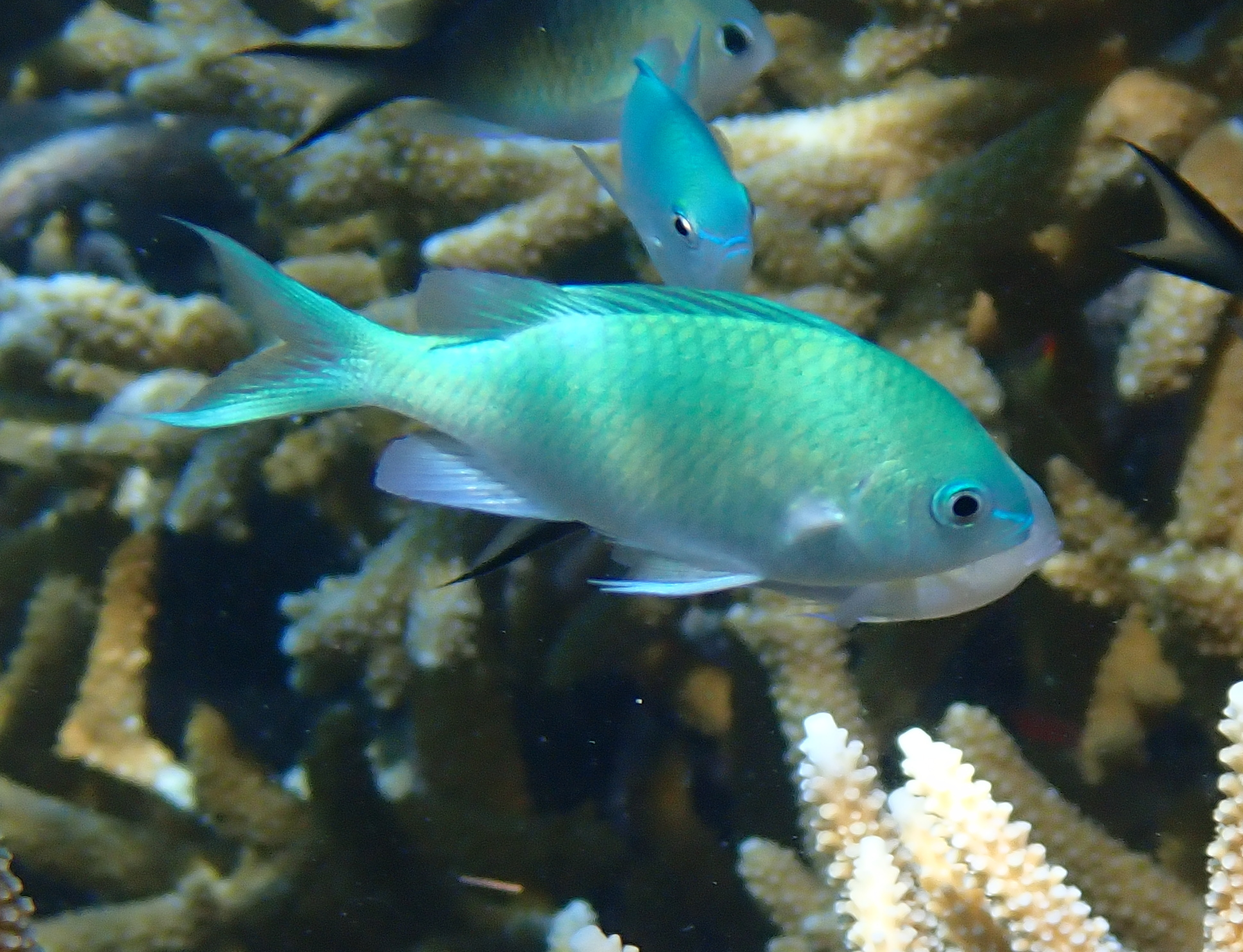
- In Kiribati

Conservation status
- Least Concern (IUCN 3.1)

Scientific classification
- Kingdom: Animalia
- Phylum: Chordata
- Class: Actinopterygii
- Division: Teleostei
- Order: Blenniiformes
- Family: Pomacentridae
- Genus: Chromis
- Species: C. viridis

Binomial name
- Chromis viridis Cuvier, 1830

= Chromis viridis =

Species of fish

Chromis viridis (green chromis) is a species of damselfish. Individuals tend to be iridescent apple-green and light blue, and reach a maximal length of 10 cm.

It is sometimes called the "blue-green chromis", but that may also refer to Chromis caerulea, the blue puller, a close relative that is sometimes considered conspecific.

== Distribution and habitat ==
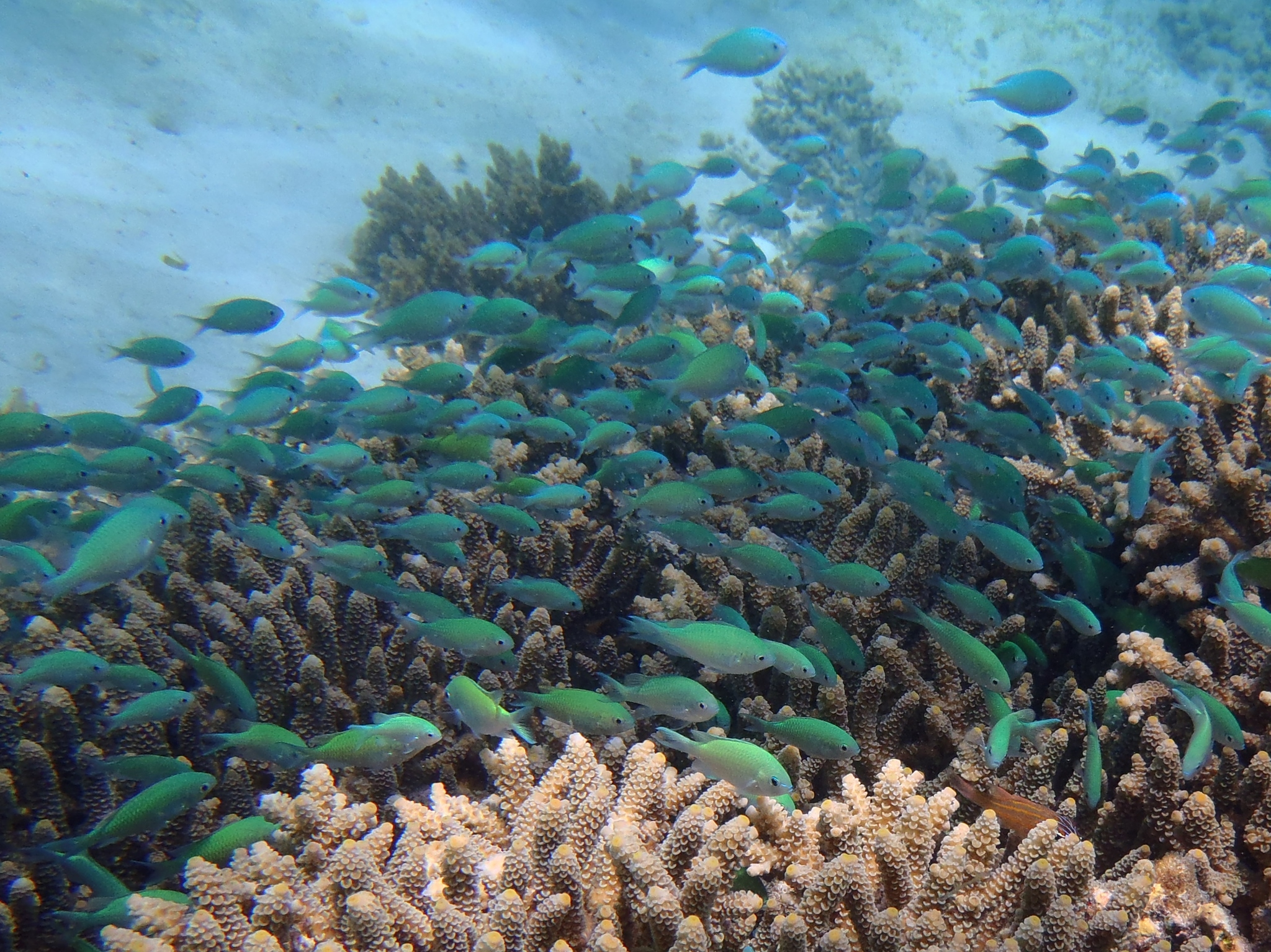
C. viridis over Acropora coral, in Indonesia

The species is found in the Indo-Pacific, including the Red Sea. It is found in tropical and subtropical waters. In the Indian Ocean, they are found in the Red Sea, the Gulf of Aden, eastern Africa, Madagascar, Seychelles, the Persian Gulf, the Arabian Sea, the Maldives, Sri Lanka, the Andaman Sea, Australia, and Indonesia. In the Pacific Ocean, they are found in the Gulf of Thailand, Indonesia, the Philippines, China, Taiwan, Japan, the Great Barrier Reef, New Zealand, New Caledonia, Polynesia, Melanesia, and Hawaii in the Indo-Pacific part of the Pacific Ocean. In the eastern Pacific Ocean, they are found from the Gulf of California south to Peru and the Galapagos Islands. There are some reports of this species in the Mediterranean Sea. They live in coral reefs and lagoons. Individuals of this species are encountered in depths of 1 to 12 metres (3.3 to 39.4 ft).

== Description ==
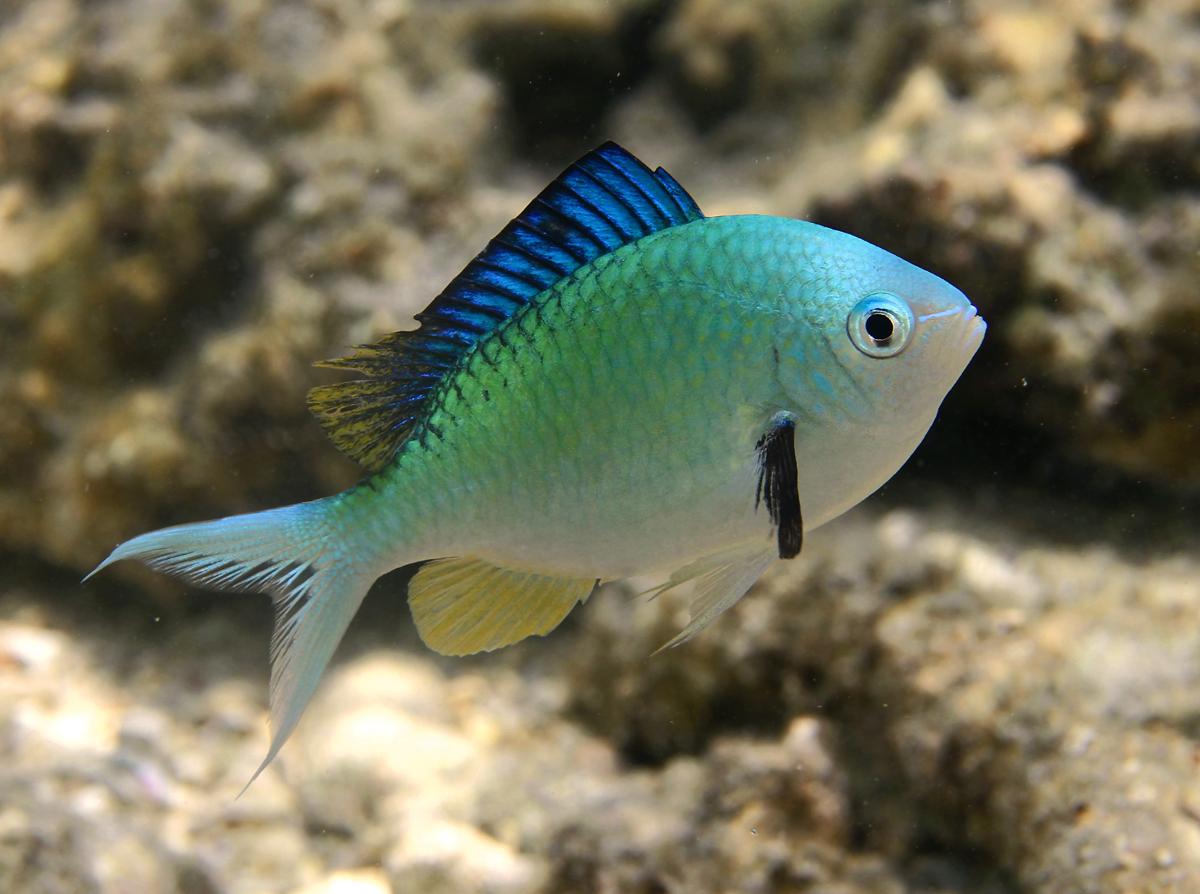
Male in breeding colours. At Réunion island.

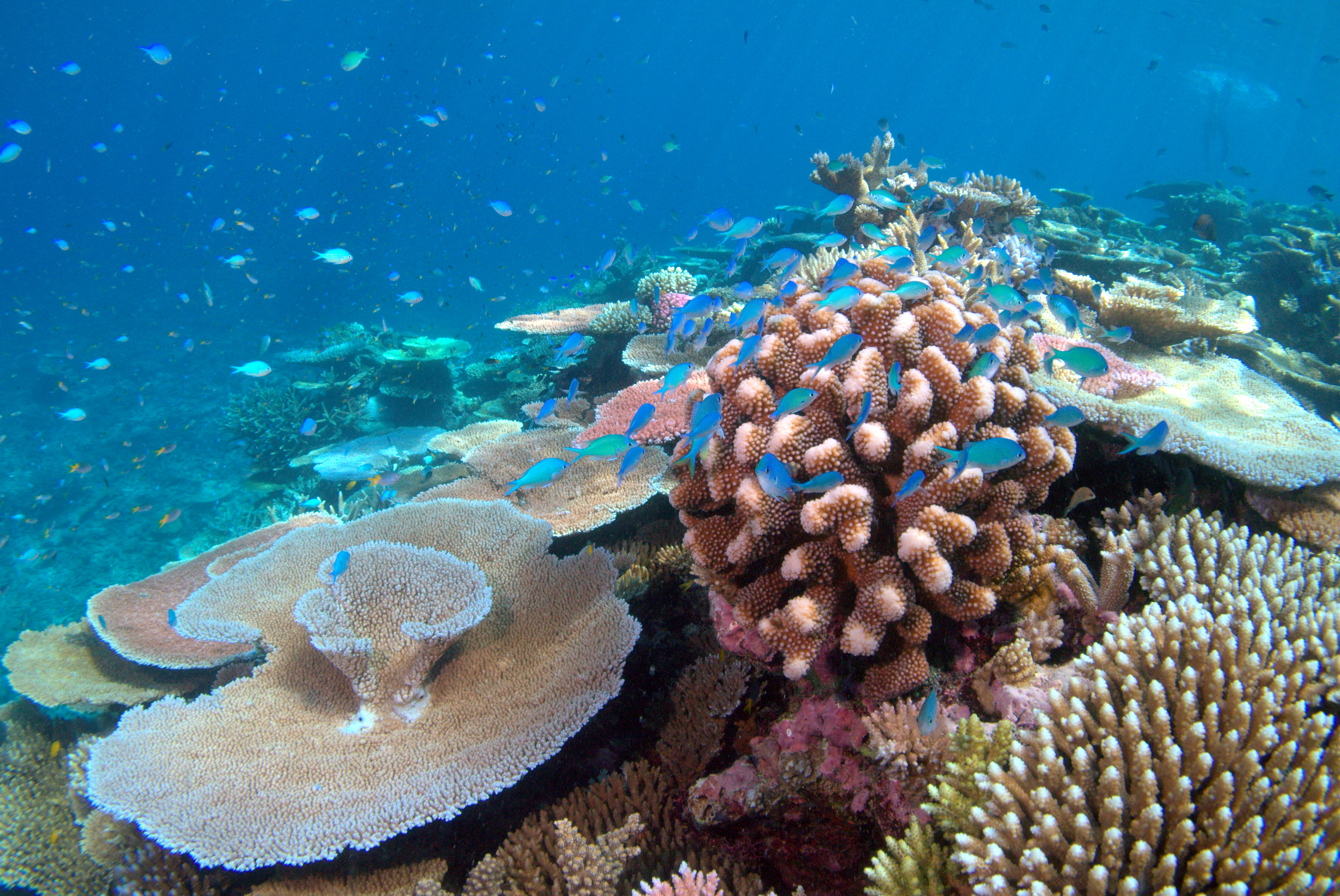
C. viridis on coral, Lodestone Reef, Australia

Adults of this species can grow up to 10 centimetres (3.9 in) at maximum length. They have 12 dorsal rays, 9 to 11 soft dorsal rays, 2 anal spines, and 9 to 11 anal soft rays on their fins. It is a blue green fish. When they are breeding, males turn more yellowish.

== Ecology ==
=== Diet ===
Phytoplankton, zooplankton, and algae, copepods, and amphipods make up the diet of this fish in the wild. This fish also feeds on eggs that fail to hatch. It feeds by ram jawing.

=== Behavior ===
Chromis viridis schools in aggregations around Acropora coral heads.

== Reproduction ==
Chromis viridis spawn over sand and rubble. The male prepares the nest which is shared with several females. The nest is located on sand or rubble. During spawning, the male turns more yellowish in color. The large number of eggs will hatch in 2–3 days. The male guards the nest and ventilates it with its fins and feeding on those eggs that do not hatch. Males feed on unhatched eggs to prevent them from being breeding grounds for microorganisms that can threaten the rest of the clutch.

== In the aquarium ==
In a marine aquarium, schools are kept in small groups of odd numbers. The green chromis is relatively inexpensive. A small school will be more comfortable in a minimum size of a 110 litres (29 US gal) tank but a single specimen can be kept in a 38 litres (10 US gal). Some aquarists have successfully bred the blue green chromis in the home aquarium.

=== Tankmates ===
The green chromis is not housed with larger predatory fish, as they may become food themselves. Groupers, lionfish, and eels all present an element of danger for this species.
