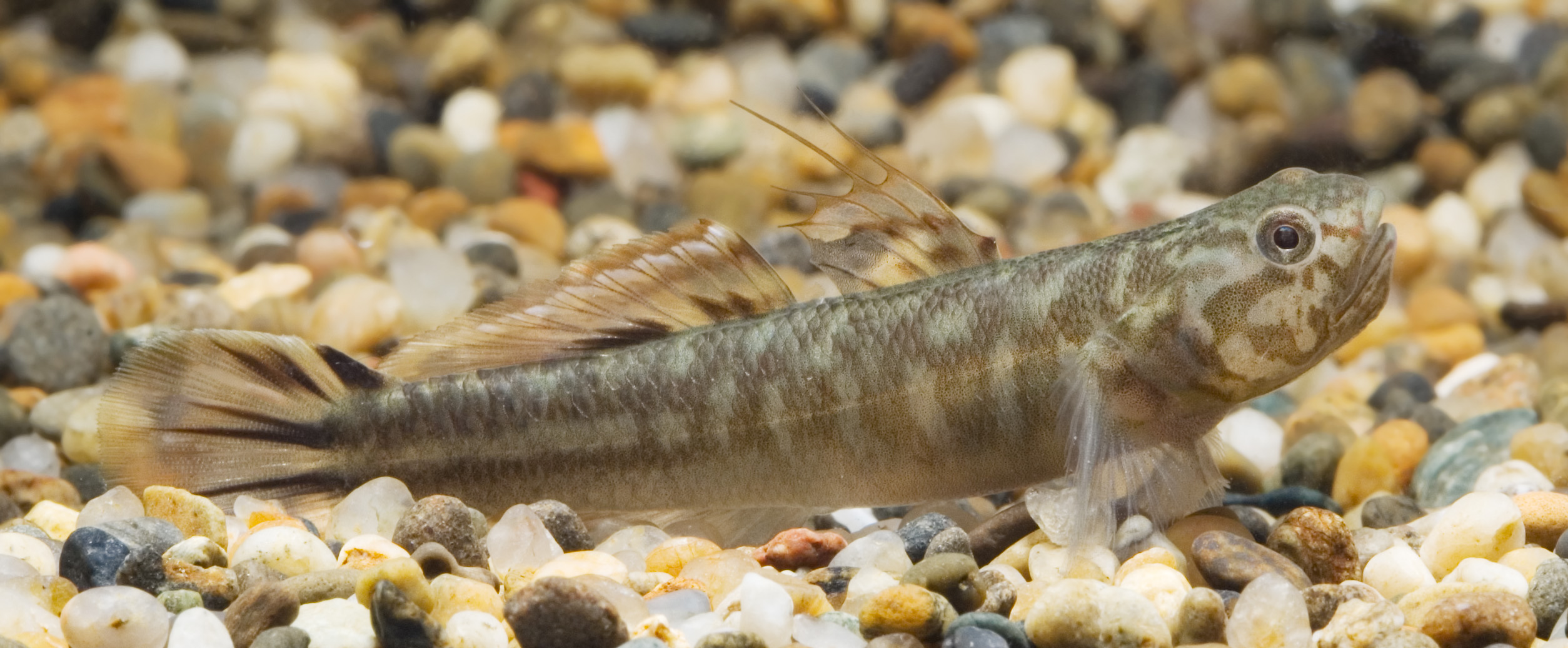
- Mugilogobius abei

Scientific classification
- Kingdom: Animalia
- Phylum: Chordata
- Class: Actinopterygii
- Order: Gobiiformes
- Family: Oxudercidae
- Subfamily: Gobionellinae
- Genus: Mugilogobius; Smitt, 1900

Type species
- Ctenogobius abei D. S. Jordan & Snyder, 1901

Synonyms
- Ellogobius Whitley, 1933; Vaimosa Jordan & Seale, 1906; Waiteopsis Whitley, 1930; Weberogobius Koumans, 1953

= Mugilogobius =

Genus of fishes

Mugilogobius is a genus of fish in the family Oxudercidae. They are found in fresh, brackish and marine water of the Indo-Pacific region. Several of the freshwater species have highly restricted distributions.

== Species ==
There are currently 29 recognized species in this genus:

- Mugilogobius abei (D. S. Jordan & Snyder, 1901) (Abe's mangrove goby)
- Mugilogobius adeia Larson & Kottelat, 1992
- Mugilogobius amadi (M. C. W. Weber, 1913)
- Mugilogobius arguellesi Roxas & Ablan, 1940
- Mugilogobius cagayanensis (Aurich, 1938)
- Mugilogobius cavifrons (M. C. W. Weber, 1909)
- Mugilogobius chulae (H. M. Smith, 1932) (Yellow-stripe mangrove goby)
- Mugilogobius fasciatus Larson, 2001
- Mugilogobius filifer Larson, 2001 (Thread-fin mangrove goby)
- Mugilogobius flavomaculatus S. P. Huang, I. S. Chen, M. N. Yung & K. T. Shao, 2016
- Mugilogobius fuscus (Herre, 1940)
- Mugilogobius fusculus (Nichols, 1951) (Obscure mangrove goby)
- Mugilogobius hitam Larson, Geiger, Hadiaty & Herder, 2014 (Black towuti goby)
- Mugilogobius latifrons (Boulenger, 1897)
- Mugilogobius lepidotus Larson, 2001
- Mugilogobius littoralis Larson, 2001 (Beach-rock mangrove goby)
- Mugilogobius mertoni (M. C. W. Weber, 1911) (Chequered mangrove goby)
- Mugilogobius myxodermus (Herre, 1935)
- Mugilogobius notospilus (Günther, 1877) (Freshwater mangrove goby)
- Mugilogobius platynotus (Günther, 1861) (Flat-backed mangrove goby)
- Mugilogobius platystoma (Günther, 1872) (Indonesian mangrove goby)
- Mugilogobius rambaiae (H. M. Smith, 1945) (Queen of Siam goby)
- Mugilogobius rexi Larson, 2001
- Mugilogobius rivulus Larson, 2001 (Drain mangrove goby)
- Mugilogobius sarasinorum (Boulenger, 1897) (Sarasin's mangrove goby)
- Mugilogobius stigmaticus (De Vis, 1884) (Black-spot mangrove goby)
- Mugilogobius tigrinus Larson, 2001
- Mugilogobius villa (Herre, 1927)
- Mugilogobius wilsoni Larson, 2001 (Wilson's mangrove goby)

Synonyms

- Mugilogobius durbanensis (Barnard, 1927); valid as M. mertoni (Durban mangrove goby)
- Mugilogobius karatunensis (Aurich, 1938); valid as M. cavifrons
- Mugilogobius nuicocensis V. H. Nguyễn & V. B. Vo, 2005; valid as M. myxodermus
- Mugilogobius paludis (Whitley, 1930); valid as M. platynotus
- Mugilogobius tagala (Herre, 1927); valid as M. cavifrons
- Mugilogobius zebra (Aurich, 1938); valid as M. chulae
