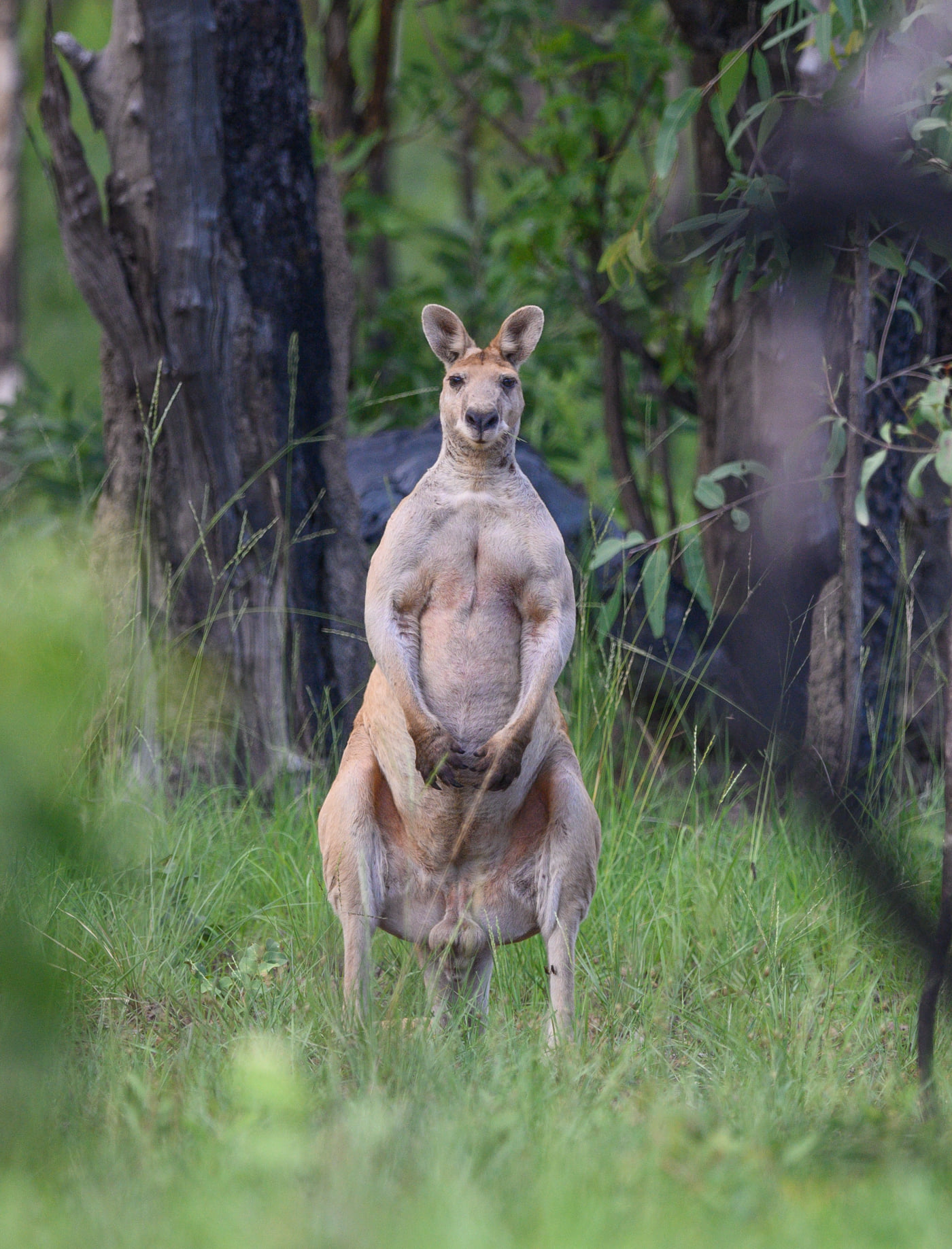

Conservation status
- Least Concern (IUCN 3.1)

Scientific classification
- Kingdom: Animalia
- Phylum: Chordata
- Class: Mammalia
- Infraclass: Marsupialia
- Order: Diprotodontia
- Family: Macropodidae
- Genus: Osphranter
- Species: O. antilopinus

Binomial name
- Osphranter antilopinus Gould, 1842
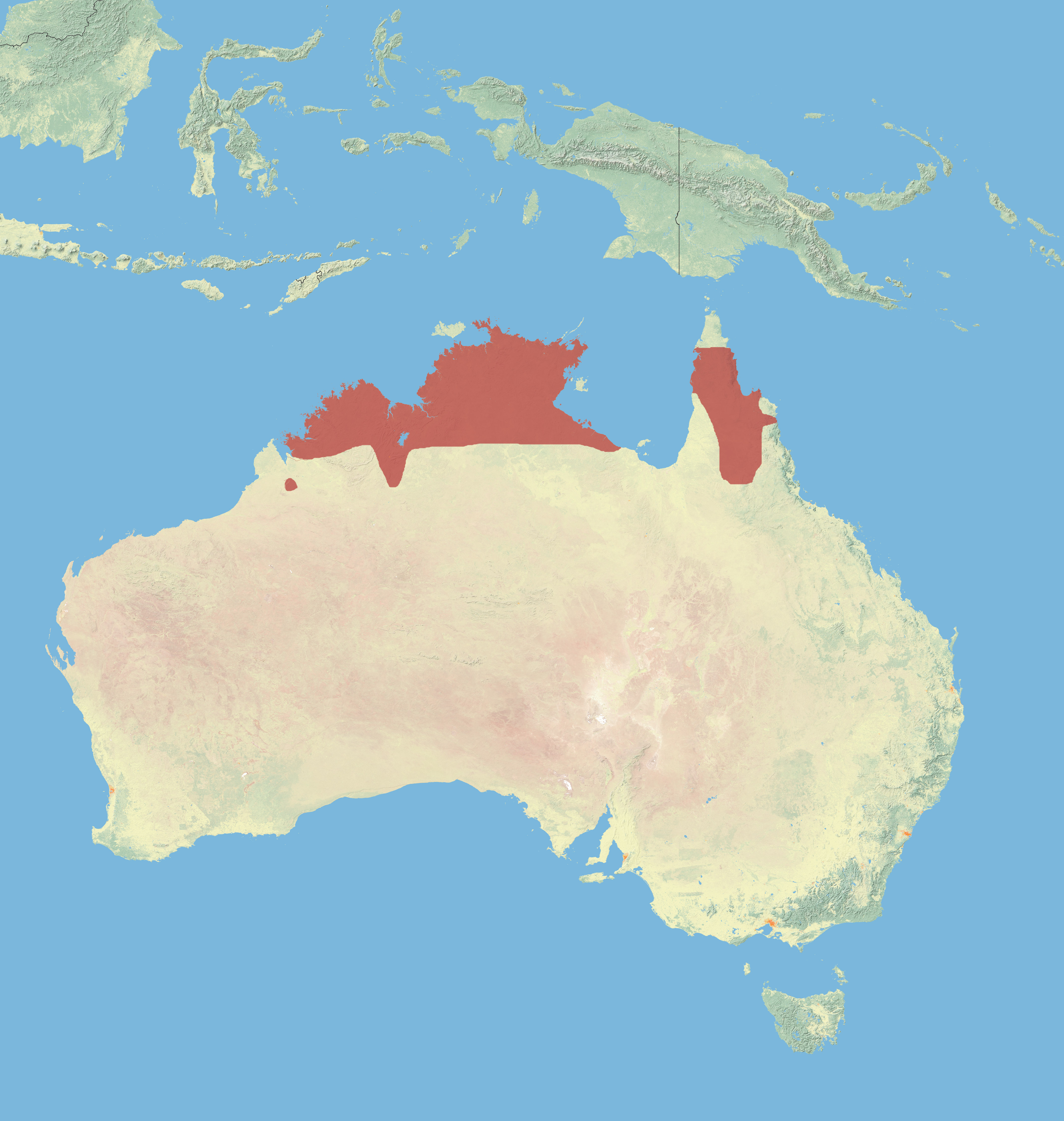
- Antilopine kangaroo range

= Antilopine kangaroo =

Species of marsupial

The antilopine kangaroo (Osphranter antilopinus), also known as the antilopine wallaroo or the antilopine wallaby, is a species of macropod found in northern Australia: in Cape York Peninsula in Queensland, the Top End of the Northern Territory, and the Kimberley region of Western Australia. It is a locally common, gregarious grazer.

== Taxonomy ==
The description of the species by John Gould was published in 1842, one of four new species of 'kangaroos' presented before the Zoological Society of London in 1841. The type location was given as Port Essington. The author assigned the new species to the genus Osphranter, a taxon later submerged as a subgenus of Macropus, and recognised an affinity with his earlier description of Macropus robustus (known as the common wallaroo or euro). A taxonomic restructuring in 2019, based on genetic analysis, promoted Osphranter back to genus level, redefining the antilopine kangaroo and the red kangaroo, among others, as species within the genus Osphranter.

The common names of the species include antilopine wallaroo, antilopine kangaroo and antilopine wallaby. The specific epithet antilopinus was proposed by Gould for the resemblance of the fur to the African mammals known as antelopes. The descriptive "antilopine" or "antelope" kangaroo is sometimes substituted as the 'antilopine wallaroo', but in behaviour and habitat it is similar to the red, eastern grey and western grey kangaroos. Occupying a similar niche to the large and reddish Osphranter rufus in the woodlands of southern and eastern Australia, it is also referred to locally as the red kangaroo, though it is a different species.

== Description ==
The antilopine kangaroo is a larger species of Osphranter, a genus of kangaroos and wallabies. They share many characteristics with others of the genus, but have longer and more slender limbs like the larger species of the genus. The fur is short, pale at the ventral side and grading to a reddish tan colour over the upper parts of the pelage. Females have similar coloration, although lighter and with greyish fur at the head and shoulders. A patch or stripe of paler coloured fur is seen at the lower part of the head, and a lighter colour at the inside and edge of the ear sharply contrasts with the darker fur colour of outer side. The paws of the front and hind legs are very dark, and contrast the lighter fur of the lower limb. Their tails are thickly covered in fur, a uniform width along its length, and a paler shade of the upper body colour. The bare skin of the rhinarium is black.

Measurements of the head and body combined is up to 1.2 metres (3.9 ft) for males, with a tail to 900 mm (35 in), and no longer than 840 mm (33 in) for females, whose tails are up to 700 mm (28 in). Their standing height, from the crown of the head to the ground, is approximately 1.1 metres (3.6 ft). The female may weigh up to 20 kilograms (44 lb), and males may be over twice this weight at 49 kilograms (108 lb).

The male's head shape, like the red kangaroo Osphranter rufus, resembles that of a mule. The antilopine kangaroo is one of a few macropods to display sexual dimorphism, with the male being mostly a reddish colour above, and females being considerably greyer. It is one of the largest macropods, being only slightly smaller than the red kangaroo and the eastern grey kangaroo (Macropus giganteus).

== Behaviour ==
Osphranter antilopinus forms social groupings whose males assert hierarchical dominance over one another. The numbers of each group may be up to 30 individuals, but these may be separate groups assembling as a response to threats from humans or dingoes. The animal may be observed as individuals or with one or two others of the species, although these are assumed to indicate that others are in the immediate area. Seasonal rainy periods induce them to feed during the day or night, but foraging activity is restricted to later parts of the day in the dry seasons. The species is observed with other macropods, often congregating around a waterhole, in the Top End with Osphranter bernardus (the black wallaroo) or more commonly with Osphranter robustus erubescens (the euro) that is also found on open eucalypt woodlands near rocky hills. Communication amongst the individuals includes a hissing sound, given as an alarm, a guttural coughing noise, and a softer cluck uttered by females to their young and when males are soliciting a mate. The species also produces a thumping sound with the foot to alert others to danger.

Breeding may occur at any time of the year, although births tend to be timed to precede the beginning of the north's wet season.

== Distribution and habitat ==
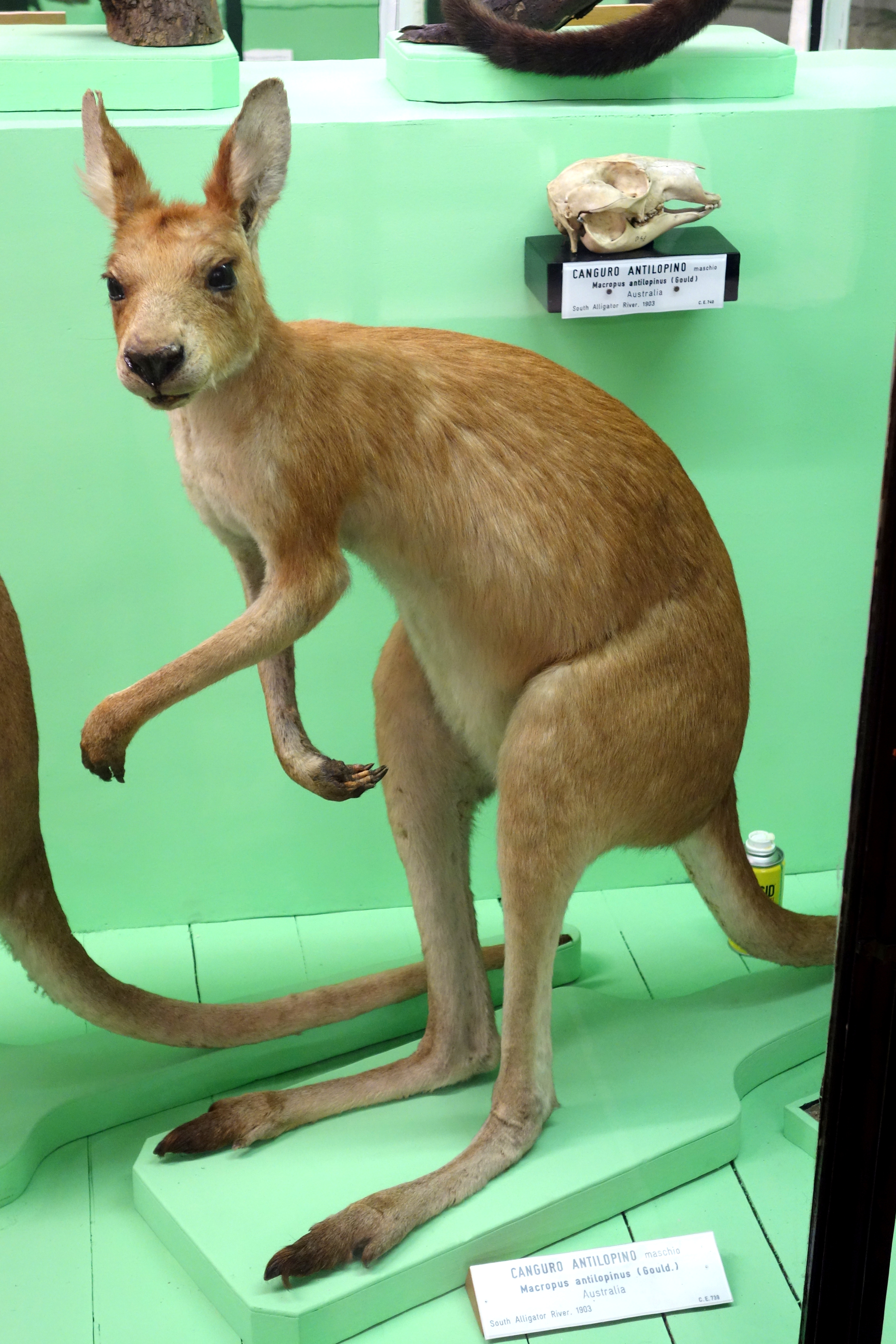
A mounted specimen and the skull of a male, exhibited at the Museo Civico di Storia Naturale di Genova, Genoa, Italy

The distribution range extends inland from the northern coast of the continent, from the Kimberley region in Western Australia across the Top End and narrowly extending to a wider range at tropical regions at the east of Cape York. The population in Queensland is geographically isolated from others by an environmental barrier below the gulf of Carpentaria, and a second and third clade are weakly distinguishable in the Northern Territory and Kimberley.

The habitat preferred by O. antilopinus is tropical, with perennial grasses providing forage, in vegetation occurring over lower hills and plains. The grasslands of its habitat are found in association with monsoonal eucalypts, as open or regenerating woodlands, or as the dominant vegetation of unwooded plains. They are only found at altitudes less than 500 metres. The species is locally common in parts of the wide range, but these groups occur in a patchy distribution within this area.

== Conservation status ==
This widely distributed and presumably numerous species is listed as least concern by the IUCN, noting that, while the population is assessed as declining, it did not meet the criteria of vulnerable to extinction. The Red List recommends that monitoring of the population be undertaken. In some locations where it was common, local populations of O. antilopinus are known to have declined. Presumed threats to the species include the increase in pastoralist use of the land, with alterations to the fire ecology and hunting being possible factors influencing the species' trajectory.
