= Mugilogobius wilsoni =

Scientific classification
- Domain: Eukaryota
- Kingdom: Animalia
- Phylum: Chordata
- Class: Actinopterygii
- Order: Gobiiformes
- Family: Oxudercidae
- Genus: Mugilogobius
- Species: M. wilsoni

Binomial name
- Mugilogobius wilsoni Larson, 2001

Species of fish

Mugilogobius wilsoni, commonly known as Wilson's mangrove goby, is a species of goby native to the waters of northern Australia.

== Etymology ==
The fish is named in honor of David Wilson of the Territory Wildlife Park in Berry Springs in the Northern Territory of Australia.
