= Northern snapping turtle =

Disambiguation page

Northern snapping turtle is a common name for several turtles and may refer to:

- Chelydra serpentina, native to eastern North America
- Elseya dentata, native to Australia
