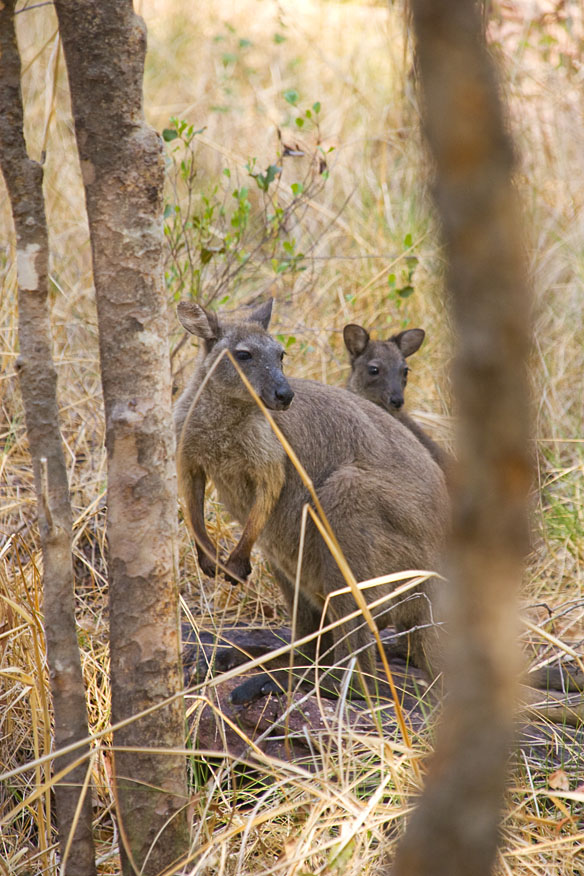

Conservation status
- Near Threatened (IUCN 3.1)

Scientific classification
- Kingdom: Animalia
- Phylum: Chordata
- Class: Mammalia
- Infraclass: Marsupialia
- Order: Diprotodontia
- Family: Macropodidae
- Genus: Osphranter
- Species: O. bernardus

Binomial name
- Osphranter bernardus (Rothschild, 1904)
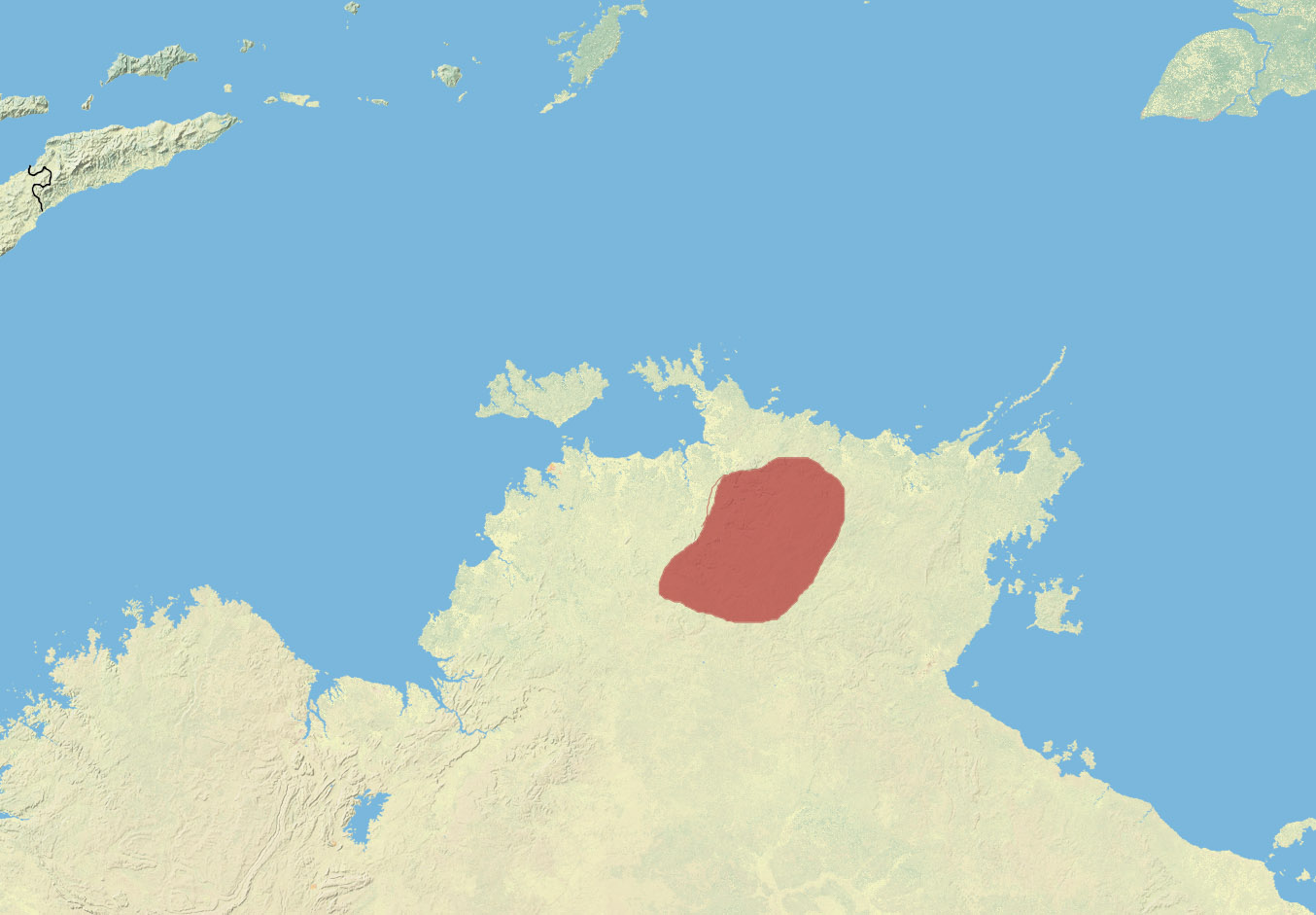
- Black wallaroo range

Synonyms
- Macropus bernardus Rothschild, 1904

= Black wallaroo =

Species of marsupial

The black wallaroo (Osphranter bernardus), also known as Woodward's wallaroo, is a species of macropod restricted to a small, mountainous area in Arnhem Land, Northern Territory, Australia, between South Alligator River and Nabarlek. It classified as near threatened, mostly due to its limited distribution. A large proportion of the range is protected by Kakadu National Park.

== Taxonomy ==
The description of the species was published by Walter Rothschild in 1904. The author initially assigned the species to a new genus as Dendrodorcopsis woodwardi, but revision of new material forwarded to England by the collector John Tunney persuaded the mammalogist Oldfield Thomas that the characteristics of the taxon were assignable to Macropus. The specific epithet woodwardi was preoccupied by another subspecies of the genus (Macropus robustus woodwardi), prompting Rothschild to assign the new epithet bernardus.

In 2019, a reassessment of macropod taxonomy determined that the species should be moved from the genus Macropus to the genus Osphranter. This change was accepted by the Australian Faunal Directory in 2020.

Other common names of O. bernardus also include black kangaroo, northern black wallaroo, Bernard's kangaroo, and Bernard's wallaroo.

== Description ==
The black wallaroo is a smaller member of the kangaroos and wallabies, and the smallest of the wallaroos. The males' fur colour is predominately very dark brown to black, whereas females are lighter and greyish-brown. The species is identifiable by a body form that is rotund and muscular and ears that are oval in shape and relatively short. The measurements of the head and body combined is up to 730 millimetres, exceeding the tail length of 640 mm or less. The approximate standing height, from the ground to the crown of the head, is 800 mm. The weight range for males is from 19 to 22 kilograms, females are usually around 13 kg.

Osphranter bernardus is by far the smallest of the wallaroos, as well as the most easily distinguished. The species exhibits strong sexual dimorphism, the male is uniformly black or dark brown and has yellowish coloration at the forearm, the female is a mid-grey colour and has dark brown to black at the ends of the limbs and tail. The dentition is a diagnostic of O. bernardus, exhibiting a uniquely grooved notch at the second incisor.

== Behaviour ==
The species is extremely shy and will attempt to flee an observer by seeking its refuge at a nearby hill or sandstone escarpment, and if pursued demonstrates great agility in leaping to ledges or descending to the ground. They also seek respite from the sun beneath escarpments or in the shade of large trees, only venturing away from these to forage for grasses and herbs or access water at a nearby location. Little research has been undertaken on the behaviour of O. bernardus, but it is known to be a shy nocturnal grazer which does not gather in groups. They find refuge from predators and extremes of weather at the rocky escarpments or caves of its habitat and will rapidly seek these whenever they are disturbed. The species remains undercover until emerging at night to forage in the local area.

Osphranter bernardus is not a gregarious species; they are usually seen alone, or as a male and female pair with perhaps one larger young. Individuals may be seen in the company of others of the genus, the tall and slender antilopine kangaroo (Osphranter antilopinus) and the common wallaroo (Osphranter robustus), especially when gathering to drink at waterholes.

== Distribution and habitat ==
The distribution range is restricted to area of eastern Arnhemland, from the South Aliigator River to Narbalek, and occur within this range at Mt Brockman and Nourlangie Rock. The favoured habitat has a monsoonal climate, and is most commonly found in these types of woodlands, rainforest over sandstone and on sandy plains dominated by a variety of grasses. The soil of the habitat is very shallow and interspersed with bare rock surfaces, typically sandstone.

== In Aboriginal language and culture ==
In the Kunwinjku language of West Arnhem Land, the male black wallaroo is known as barrk (or nadjinem in the Kuninjku dialect), while the female is called djukerre. It is common in the Kunwinjku language for male and female macropods to have different names. Black wallaroos are said to be the 'pets' of Nakidjkidj spirits. Kunwinjku sometimes keep them as pets. According to Reverend Peterson Nganjmirra they are 'quiet'.
