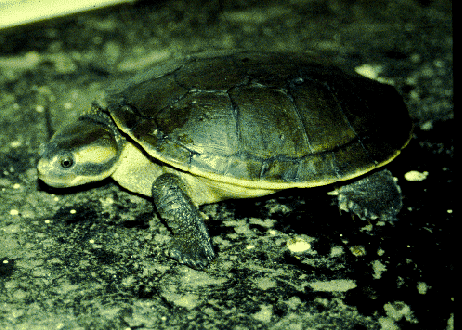

Scientific classification
- Kingdom: Animalia
- Phylum: Chordata
- Class: Reptilia
- Order: Testudines
- Suborder: Pleurodira
- Family: Chelidae
- Genus: Emydura
- Species: E. victoriae

Binomial name
- Emydura victoriae (Gray, 1842)

Synonyms
- See text

= Emydura victoriae =

Red-faced turtle

Species of turtle

Emydura victoriae, also known commonly as the red-faced turtle, Victoria short-necked turtle and Victoria River turtle, is a species of medium-sized aquatic turtle in the family Chelidae. The species inhabits rivers, streams and permanent water bodies across much of northern Australia.

== Etymology ==
The specific name, victoriae, refers to the Victoria River (Northern Territory).

== Taxonomy ==
The species E. victiriae has a disrupted nomenclatural history. For many years it appeared in the literature as Emydura australis (Gray 1841: 445) however in 1983 this name was synonymised with Emydura macquarii, incorrectly according to Iverson et al. 2001. Since this time the species has been known as Emydura victoriae this name too has nomenclatural issues and it is possible the names may eventually be reversed again.

=== Synonymy ===
- Hydraspis victoriae Gray 1842:55
  - Chelymys victoriae Gray 1872:21
  - Chelymys victoriae Baur 1888:419
  - Chelymys victoriae Baur 1889
  - Emydura victoriae Worrell 1964:17
  - Tropicochelymys victoriae — Wells & Wellington, 1985: 9
  - Emydura victoriae King & Burke 1989
  - Emydura victoriae Georges 1996
  - Emydura victoria Cann, 1997: 28 (ex errore)
  - Emydura victoriae Cogger 2000: 199
  - Emydura victoriae Georges & Thomson 2010
  - Emydura victoriae Kehlmaier et al. 2019
  - Emydura victoriae TTWG 2021
