= Choanocotylidae =

Scientific classification
- Kingdom: Animalia
- Phylum: Platyhelminthes
- Class: Trematoda
- Order: Plagiorchiida
- Suborder: Xiphidiata
- Superfamily: Plagiorchioidea
- Family: Choanocotylidae; Jue Sue & Platt, 1998

Family of flukes

Choanocotylidae is a family of trematodes belonging to the order Plagiorchiida.

Genera:

- Auriculotrema Platt, 2003
