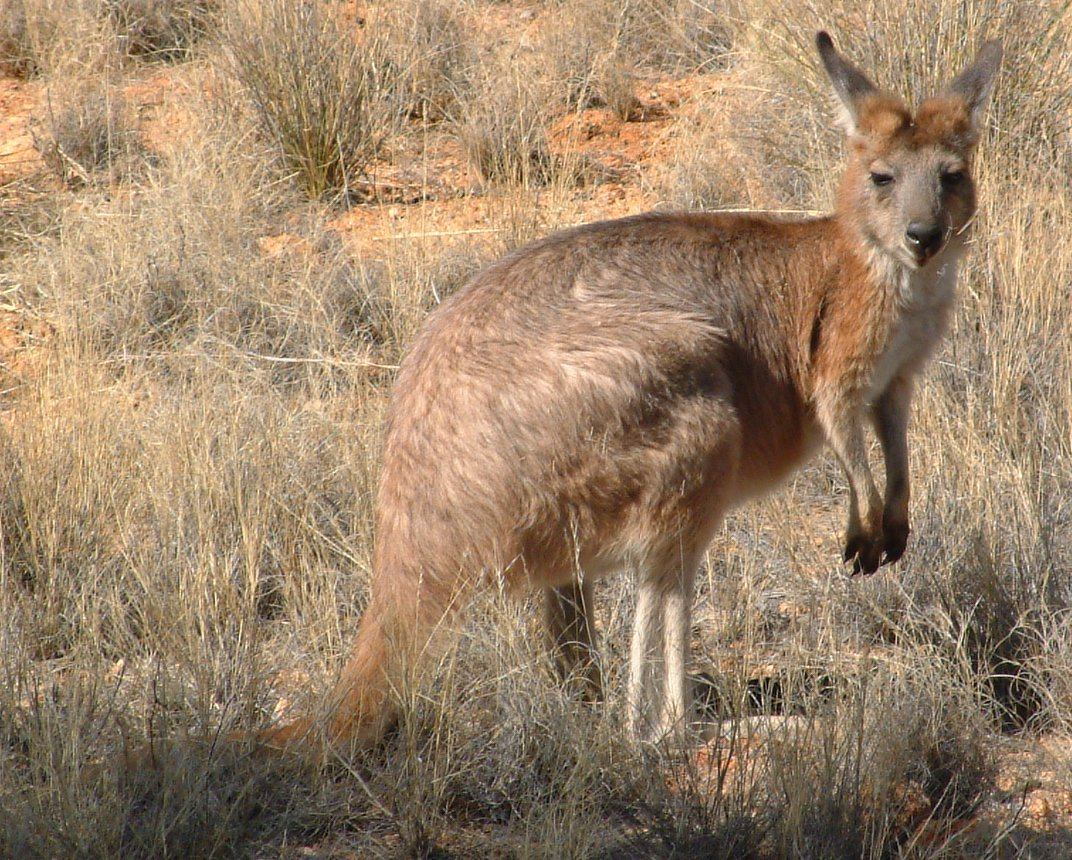
- Euro (Osphranter robustus erubescens)

Conservation status
- Least Concern (IUCN 3.1)

Scientific classification
- Kingdom: Animalia
- Phylum: Chordata
- Class: Mammalia
- Infraclass: Marsupialia
- Order: Diprotodontia
- Family: Macropodidae
- Genus: Osphranter
- Species: O. robustus

Binomial name
- Osphranter robustus Gould, 1841

Subspecies
- O. r. erubescens; O. r. isabellinus; O. r. robustus; O. r. woodwardi
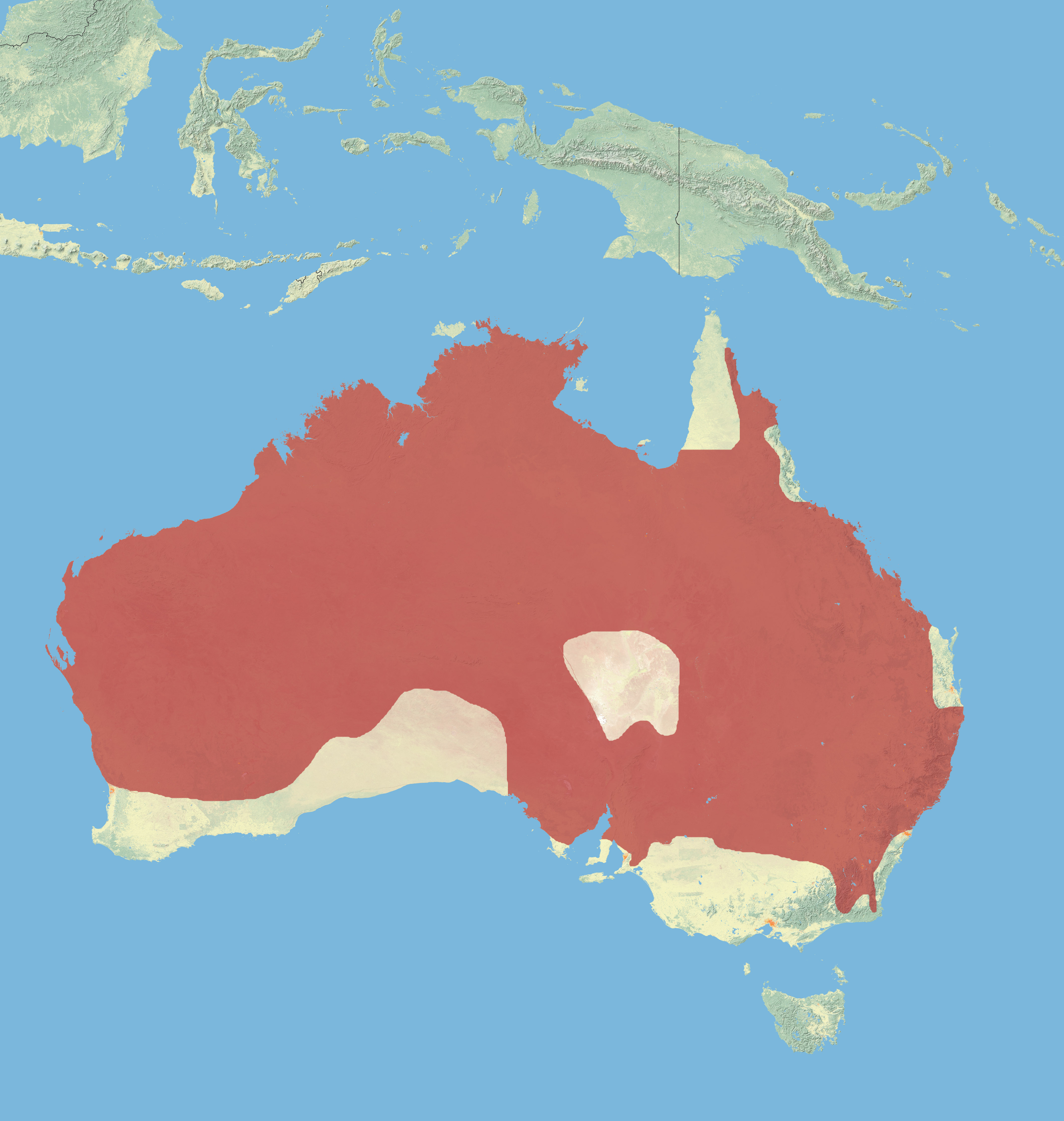
- Common wallaroo range

= Common wallaroo =

Wallaroo

Species of marsupial

The common wallaroo (Osphranter robustus), also known as the euro, hill wallaroo, or simply wallaroo, is a species of macropod (a family of marsupials that also includes kangaroos and wallabies). The word euro is particularly applied to one subspecies (O. r. erubescens).

The eastern wallaroo is mostly nocturnal and solitary, and is one of the more common macropods. It can make a loud hissing noise. All four subspecies are sexually dimorphic.

== Subspecies ==
There are four subspecies:

- the eastern wallaroo (O. r. robustus) – found in eastern Australia; males of this subspecies have dark grey fur, almost resembling the black wallaroo (Osphranter bernardus). Females are lighter, being almost sandy in colour.
- the euro or western wallaroo (O. r. erubescens) – found covering most of the species' remaining range to the west; this subspecies is variable, but mostly brownish, in colour.
- the Barrow Island wallaroo (O. r. isabellinus) – this subspecies is restricted to Barrow Island in Western Australia and is comparatively small. It is uniformly reddish-brown.
- the Kimberley wallaroo (O. r. woodwardi) – this subspecies is found in the Kimberley region of Western Australia and in a band roaming through the Northern Territory. It is the palest of the four subspecies and is a dull brown-grey colour. The Kunwinjku people of western Arnhem Land call this subspecies ngabudj. They also have separate names for male and female, galkibard and wallaar, respectively. A large male is called ganduki. This animal manages well in areas without permanent water and on a diet of nutrient-poor grasses, but it does need shelter.

The eastern wallaroo (O. r. robustus)—which is dark grey in colour—occupies the eastern slopes of the Great Dividing Range, and the euro (O. r. erubescens)—which is mostly brownish in colour—occupies the land westward.

== Reproduction ==
Wallaroo females can give birth at any time during the year. Through a process called embryonic diapause they are able to get pregnant any time after giving birth, but the embryo does not start to develop until the previous joey is able to leave the pouch of the mother. Wallaroos are also polygynous, which means that the males can have multiple female partners.

Male wallaroos will engage in non-deadly physical combat over mating access to females.

The gestation period lasts around 30 to 38 days, after which the young joey travels into the mother's pouch where it suckles and develops. The young joeys start to leave the pouch at around six months and by nine months they no longer spend most of their time in the pouch. Male wallaroos are fully developed at around 18 to 20 months; females are fully developed at around 14 to 24 months.

The relationship with the joey and their parents changes as the joey grows and gets older. During the time in which the joey is in the pouch, the father stays around to protect the joey and mother from predators, but once this protection is no longer needed the relationship weakens between the two. After the joey no longer needs its mother for food, it still maintains a close relationship with her.

== Status ==
The eastern wallaroo as a subspecies is not considered to be threatened, but the Barrow Island subspecies (O. r. isabellinus) is classified as vulnerable.

== Taxonomy ==
In 2019, a reassessment of macropod taxonomy determined that the species should be moved from the genus Macropus to the genus Osphranter. This change was accepted by the Australian Faunal Directory in 2020.

== Emblems and popular culture ==
The common wallaroo was used for the name and cap emblem of Wallaroo FC, Australia's first rugby union football club founded in Sydney in 1870. The Australian national women's rugby union team was in 1994 named 'The Wallaroos'.

The famous 1770 kangaroo sketches drawn by botanical illustrator Sydney Parkinson during Captain James Cook and Joseph Banks' HMS Endeavour voyage were determined to be an eastern wallaroo (O. r. robustus) following a 1970 study by Australian zoologist Geoffrey Sharman. The 1772 oil paintingThe Kongouro from New Holland by George Stubbs appears to be based on the Parkinson drawings.
