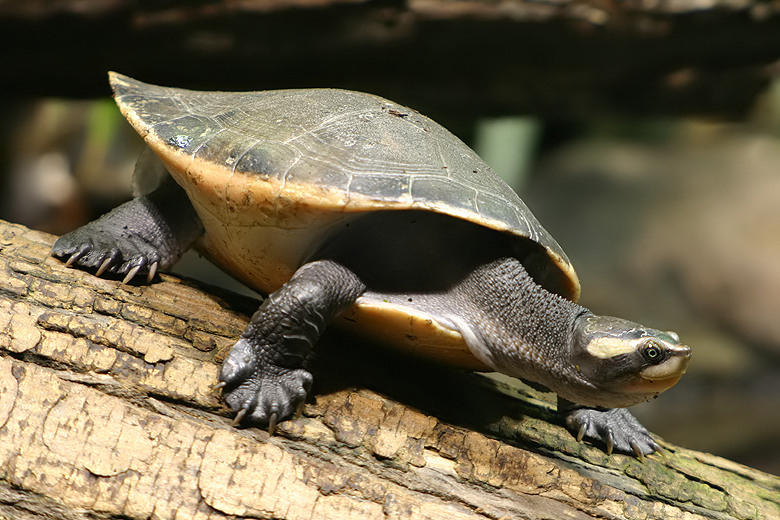
- Red-bellied short-necked turtle at Cologne Zoo

Conservation status
- Least Concern (IUCN 2.3)

Scientific classification
- Kingdom: Animalia
- Phylum: Chordata
- Class: Reptilia
- Order: Testudines
- Suborder: Pleurodira
- Family: Chelidae
- Genus: Emydura
- Species: E. subglobosa

Binomial name
- Emydura subglobosa (Krefft, 1876)

Synonyms
- Emydura subglobosa subglobosa: Euchelymys subglobosa Krefft, 1876; Emydura albertisii Boulenger, 1888; Tropicochelymys goodei Wells & Wellington, 1985 (nomen nudum); Emydura subglobosa — Iverson, 1986; Emydura subglobosa subglobosa — Georges & Thomson, 2010; Emydura subglobosa angkibaanya Joseph-Ouni et al., 2019; Emydura subglobosa worrelli: Tropicochelymys worrelli Wells & Wellington, 1985; Tropicochelymys leichhardti Wells & Wellington, 1985 (nomen nudum); Emydura worrelli — Cogger, 2000; Emydura subglobosa worrelli — Georges & M. Adams, 1996

= Red-bellied short-necked turtle =

Species of turtle

The red-bellied short-necked turtle (Emydura subglobosa), also known commonly as the pink-bellied side-necked turtle and the Jardine River turtle, is a species of turtle in the family Chelidae. The species is native to Australia and New Guinea. There are two recognized subspecies.

== Description ==
E. subglobosa, a hard-shelled aquatic turtle of the family Chelidae, is generally one of the more colorful members of the family.

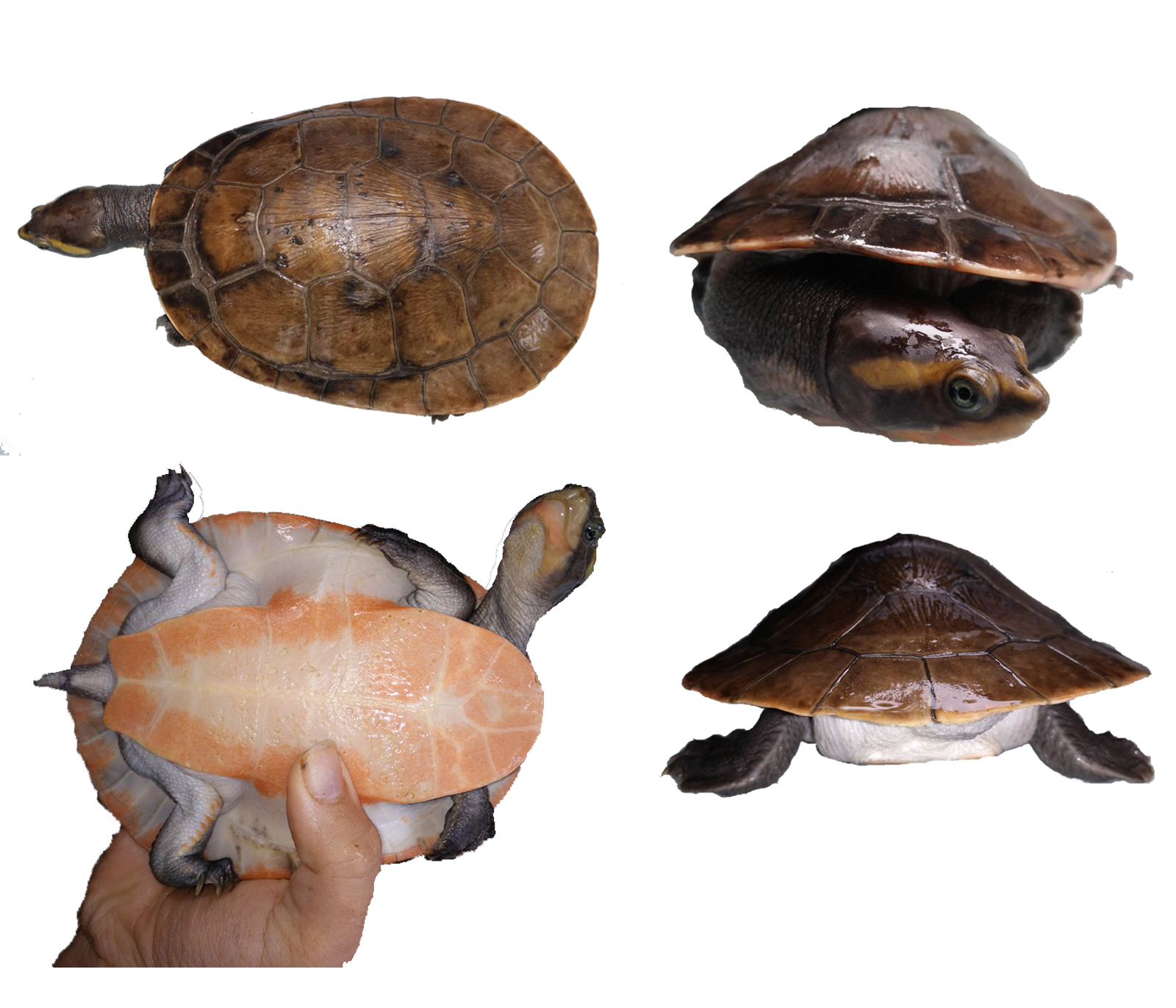
Emydura subglobosa, description views

== Geographic range ==
E. subglobosa is found in northern Queensland, Australia, and in southern New Guinea.

== Habitat ==
E. subglobosa lives in freshwater rivers and swamps, and also in lagoons and lakes.

== In captivity ==
The red-bellied short-necked turtle is popular as a pet. A 75-gallon or larger aquarium is used to house this species. In captivity, it feeds on fish, commercial turtle pellets, and plant matter.

Due to Australia's ban of exporting wild-caught animals, all wild-caught individuals are from New Guinea. In Florida in the United States, E. subglobosa had been bred to supply the market. Hong Kong and Taiwan had also bred the red-bellied short-necked turtle.
