= Maranoa =

Maranoa may refer to several places in Australia:

- Maranoa, Queensland, a region of South West Queensland, Australia
  - Division of Maranoa, an electoral district in the Australian House of Representatives
  - Maranoa Region, a local government area in Queensland
  - Maranoa County, a Cadastral County in Queensland relating to the same area
  - Maranoa Land District
  - Maranoa River, a river in the area
- Maranoa Gardens, a park in the Melbourne suburb of Balwyn, Victoria
