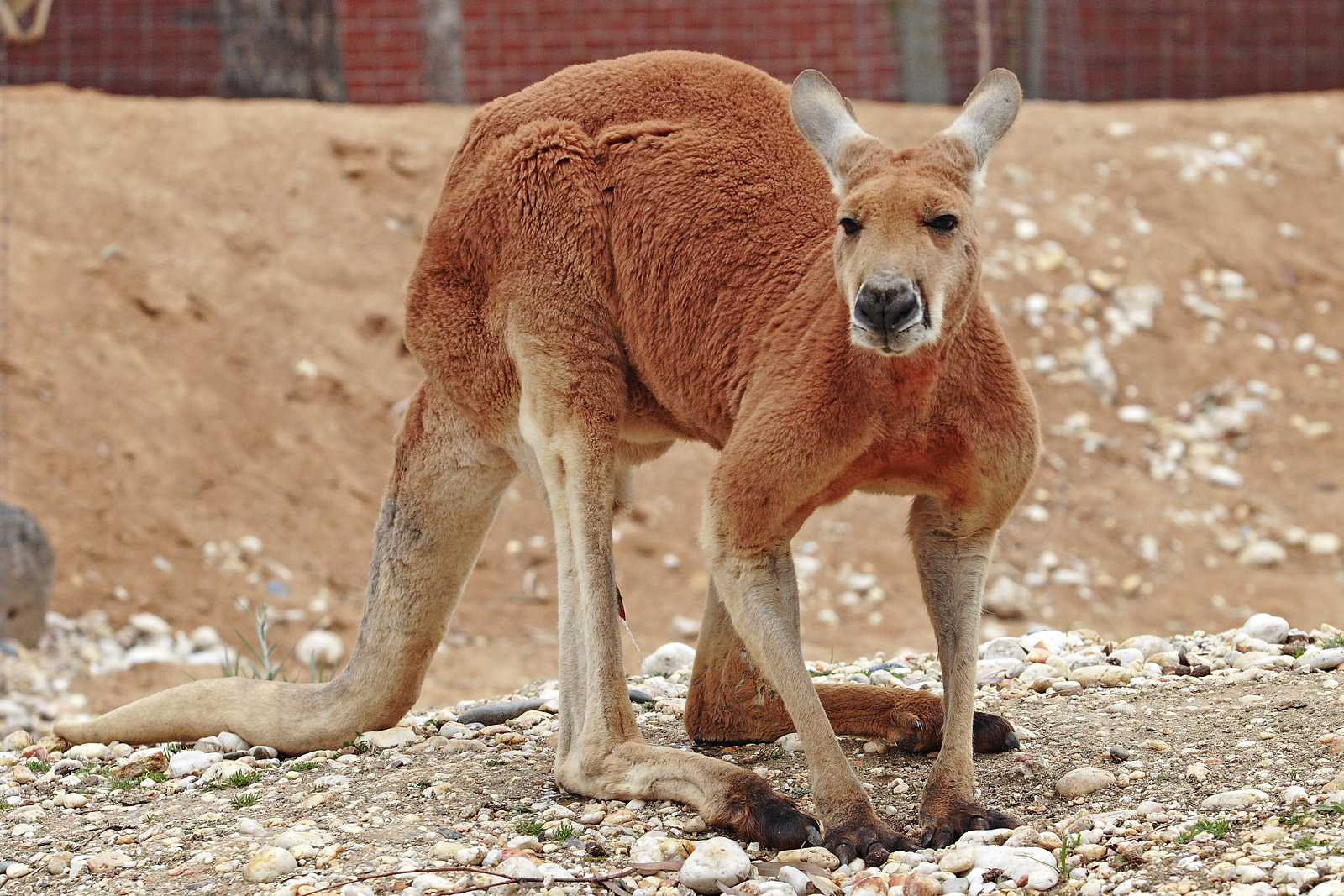
- A male at Healesville Sanctuary in Healesville, Victoria
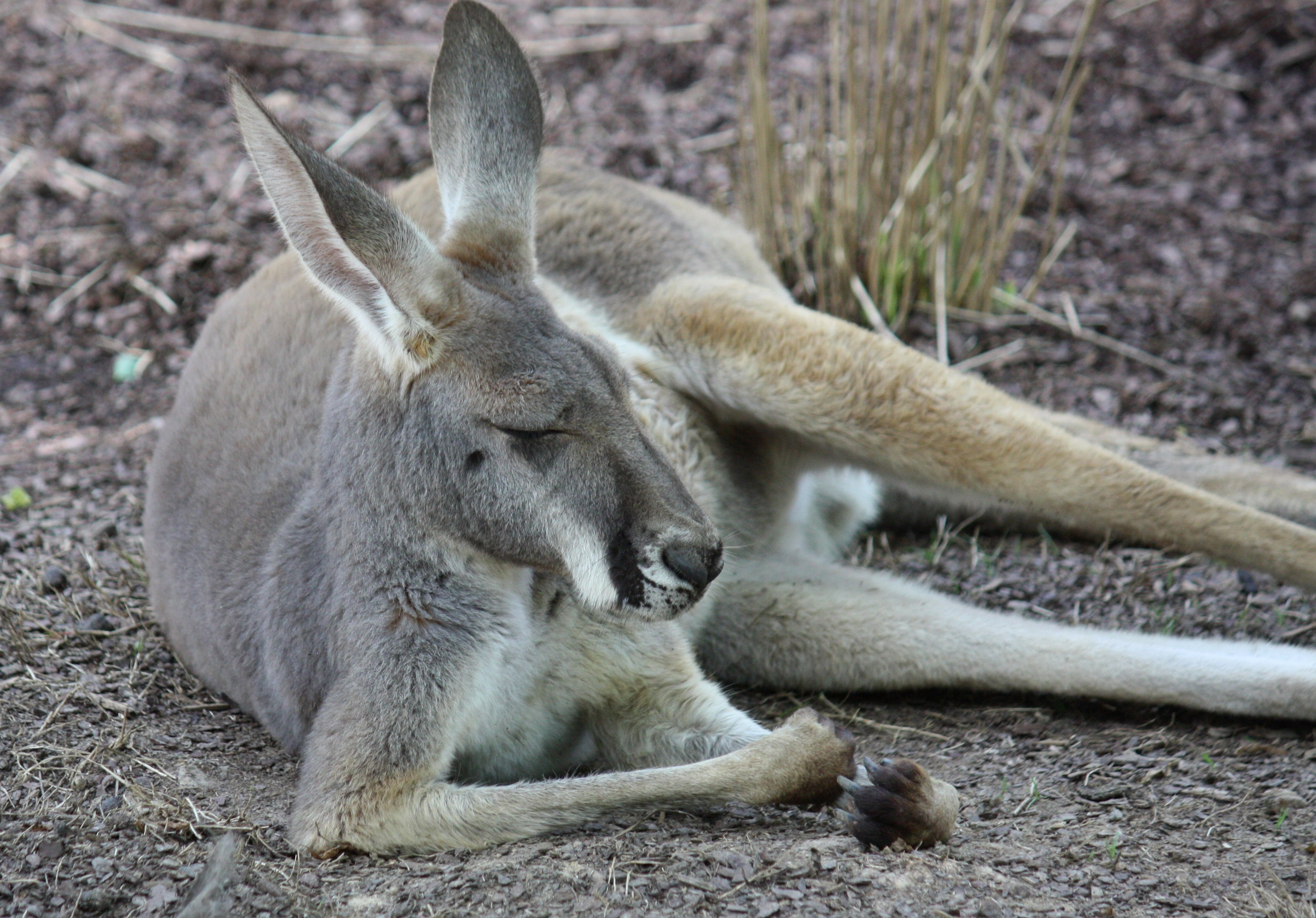
- A female at the Nashville Zoo in Nashville, Tennessee

Conservation status
- Least Concern (IUCN 3.1)

- Delisted (ESA)

Scientific classification
- Kingdom: Animalia
- Phylum: Chordata
- Class: Mammalia
- Infraclass: Marsupialia
- Order: Diprotodontia
- Family: Macropodidae
- Genus: Osphranter
- Species: O. rufus

Binomial name
- Osphranter rufus (Desmarest, 1822)
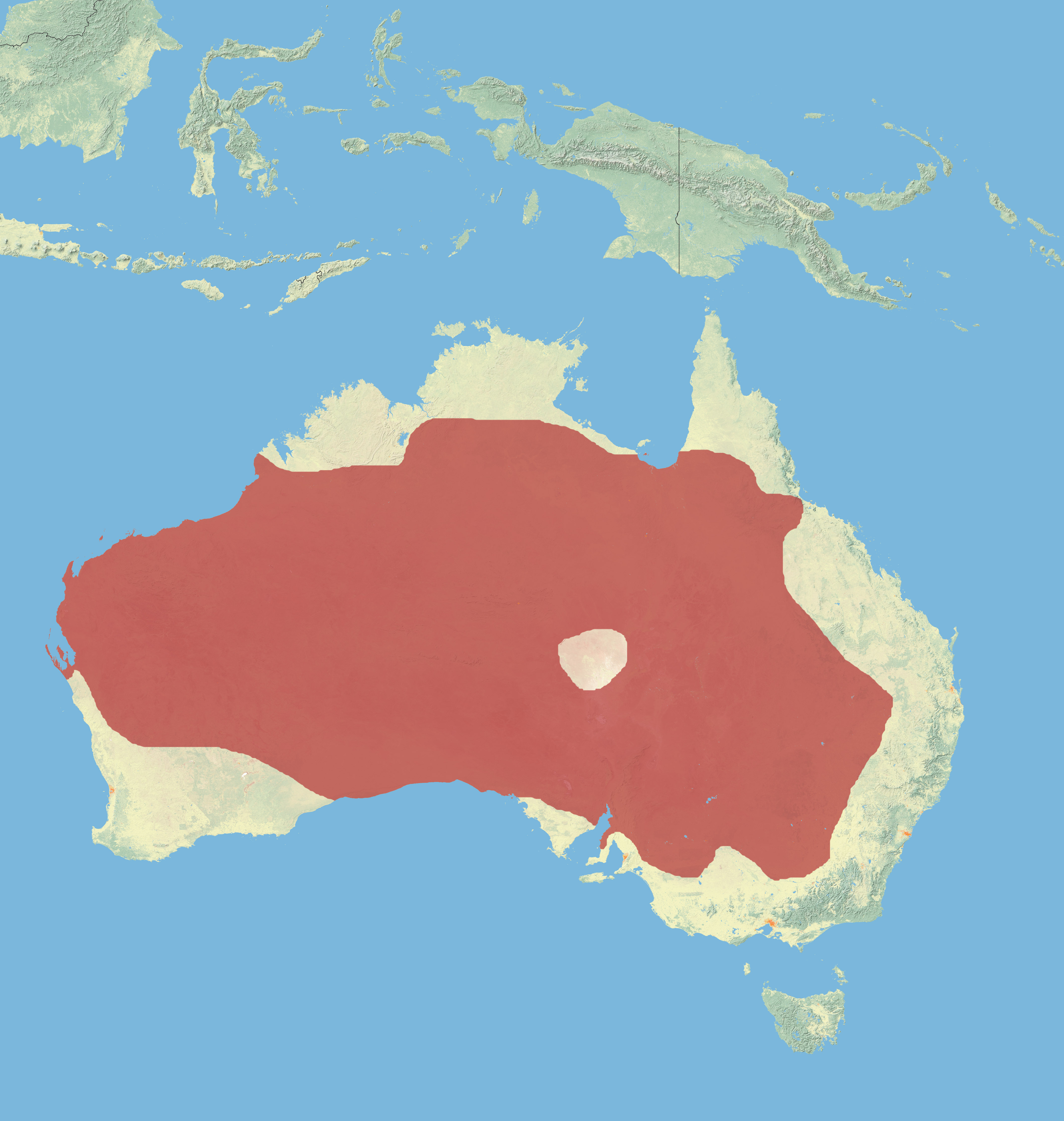

Synonyms
- List: Kangurus rufus Desmarest, 1822; Megaleia rufa Desmarest, 1822; Kangurus laniger Gaimard, 1823; Kangurus griseolanosus Quoy & Gaimard, 1825; Macropus lanigerus Gray, 1825; Kangurus lanosus Gray, 1827; Kangurus lanosus Gray, 1843; Macropus (Osphranter) pictus Gould, 1861; Macropus ruber Crisp, 1862; Macropus (Boriogale) magnus Owen, 1874; Macropus rufus dissimulatus Rothschild, 1905; Macropus rufus occidentalis Cahn, 1906; Macropus rufus dissimulator Lydekker, 1906; Macropus rufus pallidus Schwarz, 1910

= Red kangaroo =

Red kangaroo Temporal range: 2–0 Ma Early Pleistocene – Recent

Species of mammal

The red kangaroo (Osphranter rufus) is the largest of all kangaroos, the largest terrestrial mammal native to Australia, and the largest extant marsupial. It is found across mainland Australia, except for the more fertile areas, such as southern Western Australia, the eastern and southeastern coasts, and the rainforests along the northern coast.

== Taxonomy ==
The initial description of the species by A.G. Desmarest was published in 1822. The type location was given as an unknown location west of the Blue Mountains. The author assigned the new species to the genus Kangurus. In 1842, Gould reassigned the species to the genus Osphranter, a taxon later submerged as a subgenus of Macropus. A taxonomic restructure in 2015 in Taxonomy of Australian Mammals by Jackson and Groves promoted Osphranter back to the genus level, redefining the red kangaroo, among others, as a species within the genus Osphranter. This was further supported by genetic analysis in 2019.

== Description ==
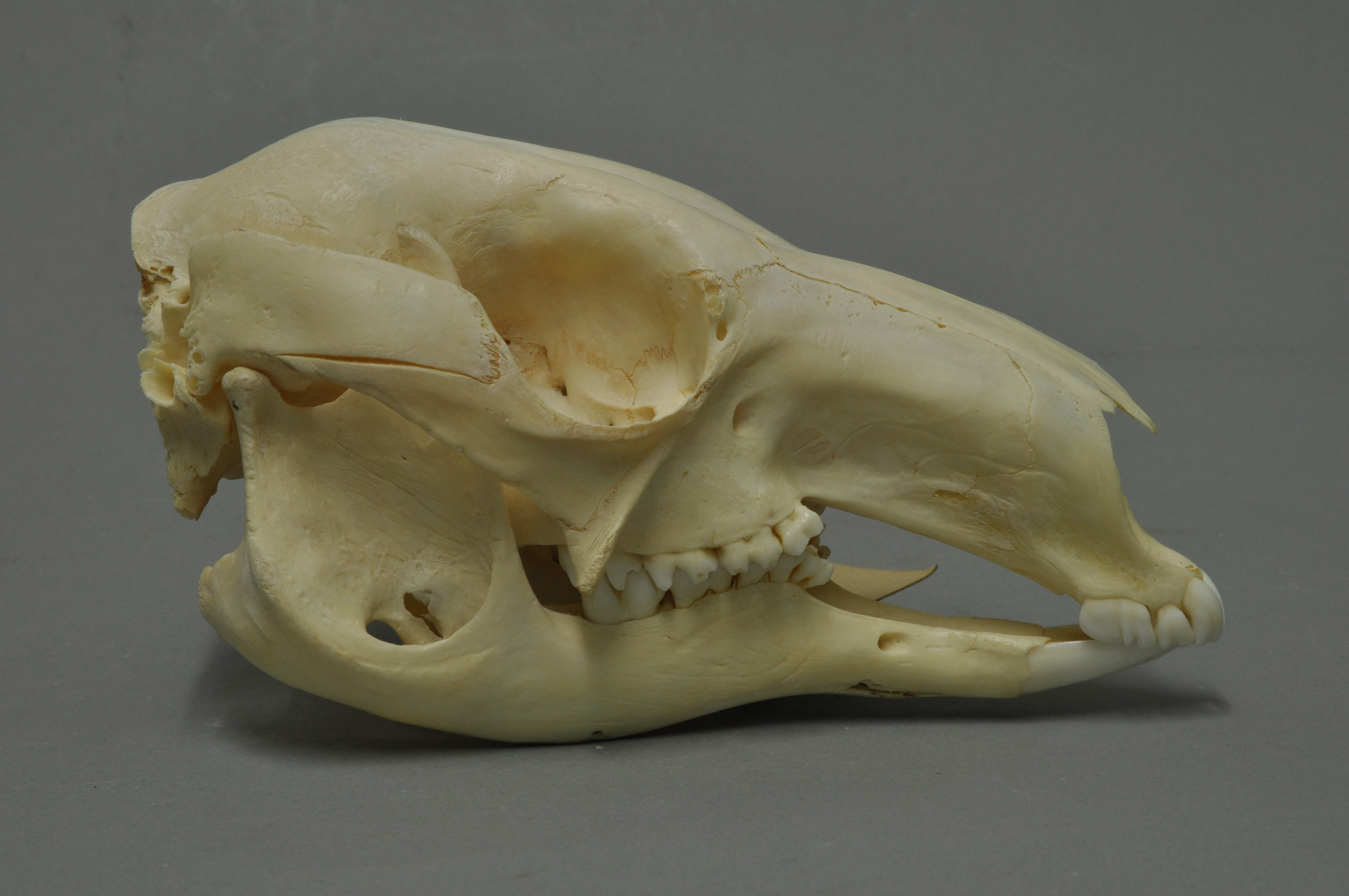
A red kangaroo skull at the Museum Wiesbaden, Germany

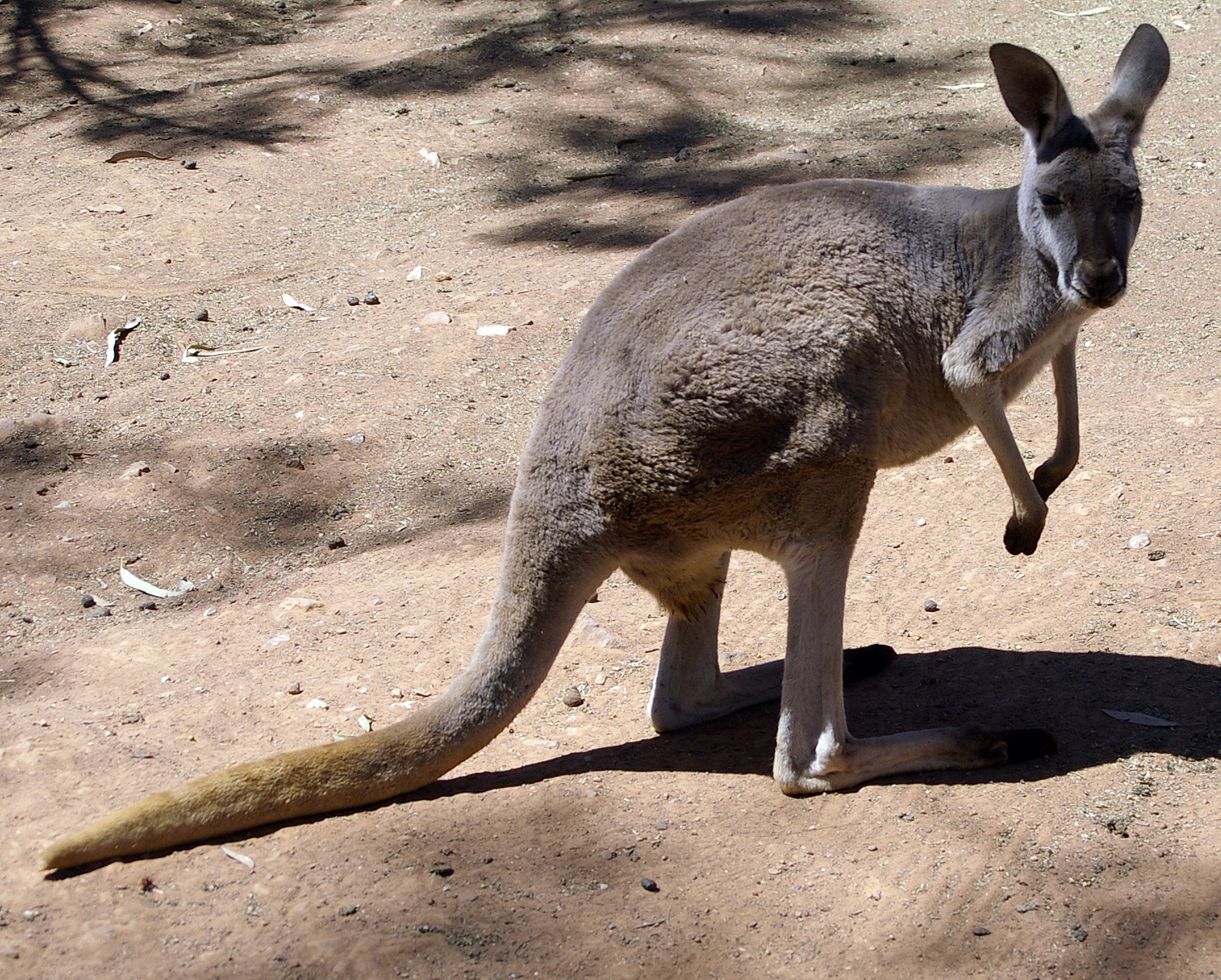
A female red kangaroo at Botanic Garden Zoo in Wagga Wagga, Australia

This species is a very large kangaroo with long, pointed ears and a square shaped muzzle (snout/nose). They are sexually dimorphic; males have short, red-brown fur, fading to pale buff below and on the limbs, while females are smaller than males and are blue-grey with a brown tinge and pale grey below, although arid zone females are coloured more like males. It has two forelimbs with small claws, two muscular hind-limbs, which are used for jumping, and a strong tail which is often used to create a tripod when standing upright.

Males grow up to a head-and-body length of 1.3–1.6 m (4 ft 3 in – 5 ft 3 in) with a tail that adds a further 1.2 m (3 ft 11 in) to the total length. Adult males are referred to by Australians as "Big Reds". Females are considerably smaller, with a head-and-body length of 85–105 cm (33–41 in) and tail length of 65–85 cm (26–33 in). Females can weigh from 18 to 40 kg (40 to 88 lb), while males typically weigh about twice as much at 55 to 90 kg (121 to 198 lb). The average red kangaroo stands approximately 1.5 m (4 ft 11 in) tall to the top of the head in upright posture. Large mature males can stand more than 1.8 metres (5 ft 11 in) tall, with the largest confirmed one having been around 2.1 m (6 ft 11 in) tall and weighed 91 kg (201 lb).

The red kangaroo maintains its internal temperature at a point of homeostasis about 36 °C (97 °F) using a variety of physical, physiological, and behavioural adaptations. These include having an insulating layer of fur, being less active and staying in the shade when temperatures are high, panting, sweating, and licking its forelimbs. They have an exceptional ability to survive in extreme temperatures using a cooling mechanism where they can increase their panting and sweating rates in high temperatures to cool their bodies. To survive in harsh conditions and conserve energy, red kangaroos can enter a state of torpor. Red kangaroos also have a high tolerance for consuming plants high in salt content, and can survive for long periods without water by reabsorbing water from their urine in the kidneys, minimizing water loss. They can go for extended periods without drinking, meeting moisture requirements from consumed vegetation.

The red kangaroo's range of vision is approximately 300° (324° with about 25° overlap), due to the position of its eyes.

== Locomotion ==
The red kangaroo's legs work much like a rubber band, with the Achilles tendon stretching as the animal comes down, then releasing its energy to propel the animal up and forward, enabling the characteristic bouncing locomotion. They can reach speeds of around 60 km/h (37 mph). The males can cover 8–9 m (26–30 ft) in one leap while reaching heights of 1.8–3 m (5 ft 11 in – 9 ft 10 in), though the average is 1.2–1.9 m (3 ft 11 in – 6 ft 3 in).

== Ecology and habitat ==
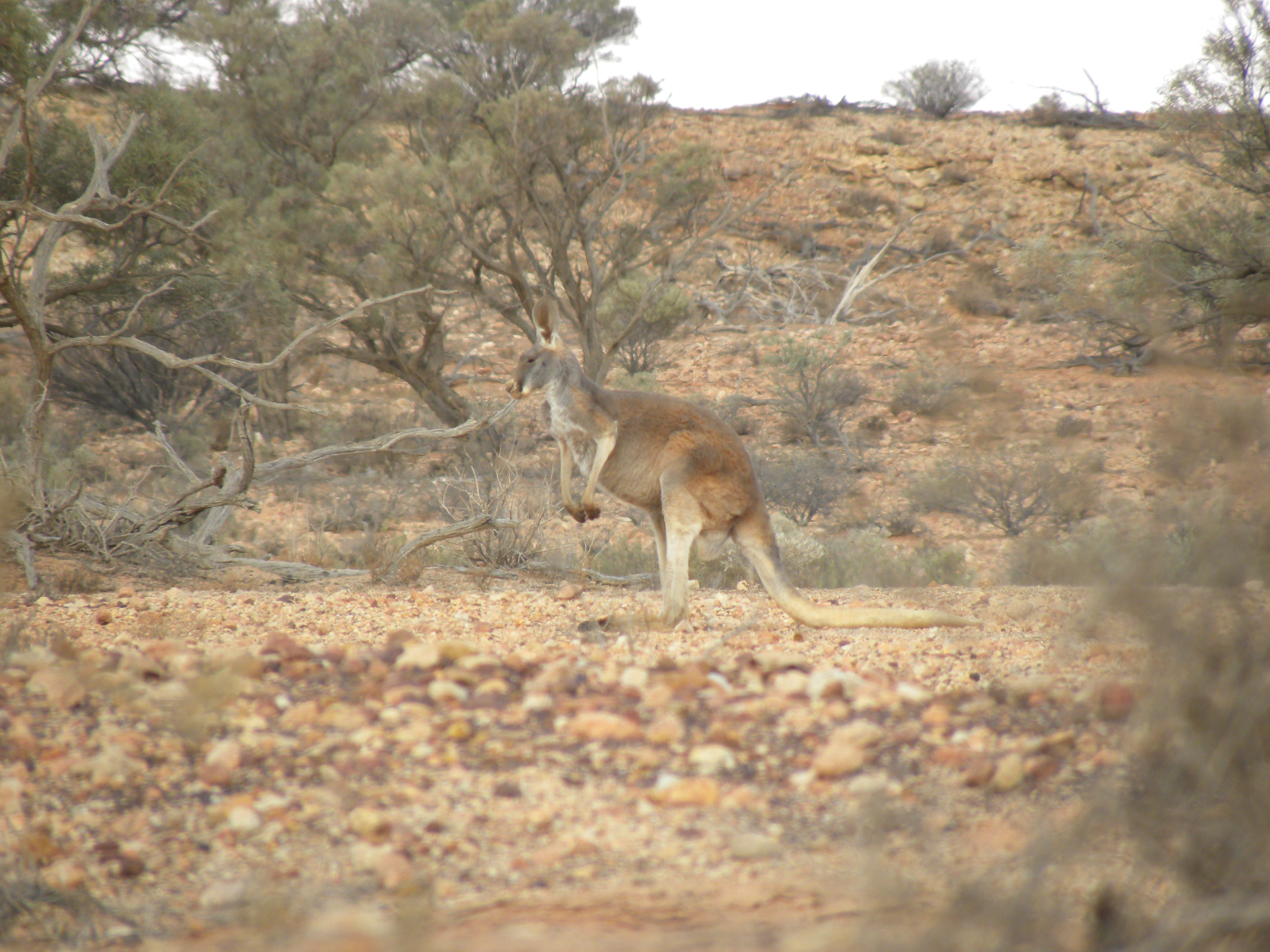
A red kangaroo in an arid environment

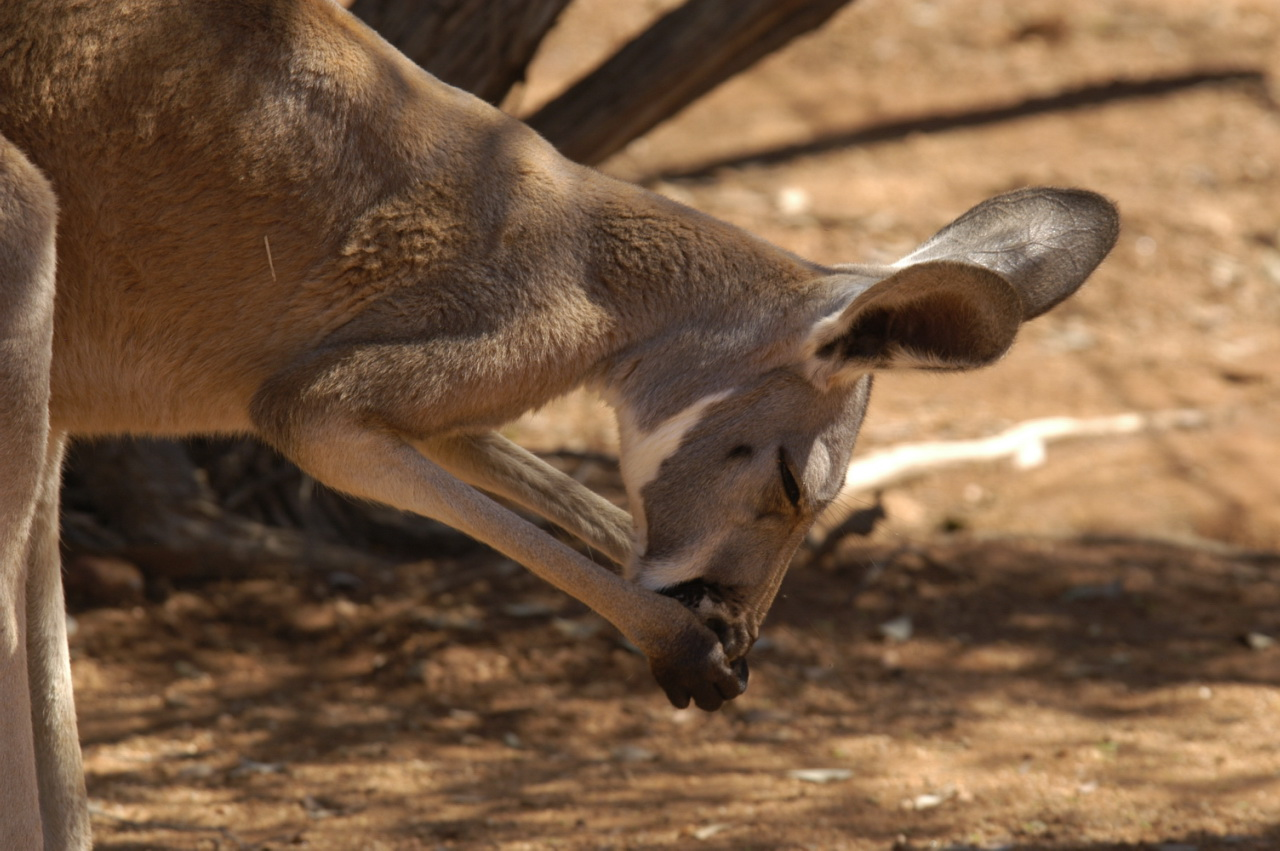
A red kangaroo at Desert Park, Alice Springs

The red kangaroo ranges throughout western and central Australia. Its range encompasses scrubland, grassland, and desert habitats. It typically inhabits open habitats with some trees for shade. Red kangaroos are capable of conserving enough water and selecting enough fresh vegetation to survive in an arid environment. The kangaroo's kidneys efficiently concentrate urine, particularly during summer. Red kangaroo primarily eat green vegetation, particularly fresh grasses, forbs and other dicotyledonous flowering plants, and can get enough even when most plants look brown and dry.

One study of kangaroos in Central Australia found that green grass makes up 75–95% of the diet, with Eragrostis setifolia dominating at 54%. This grass continues to be green into the dry season. Kangaroos primarily consumed this species, along with Enneapogon avenaceus in western New South Wales, where it comprised as much as 21–69% of the red kangaroo's diet according to one study. During dry times, kangaroos search for green plants by staying on open grassland and near watercourses. While grasses and forbs are preferred, red kangaroos will also eat certain species of chenopods, like Bassia diacantha and Maireana pyramidata, and will browse shrubs when its favoured foods are scarce. Some perennial chenopods, such as round-leaf chenopod Kochia are avoided even when abundant.

A big male red kangaroo named Quincy hopping in Dresden Zoo, Germany

At times, red kangaroos congregate in large numbers; in areas with much forage, these groups can number as much as 1,500 individuals. Red kangaroos are mostly crepuscular and nocturnal, resting in the shade during the day. They sometimes move about during the day. Red kangaroos rely on small saltbushes or mulga bushes for shelter in extreme heat rather than rocky outcrops or caves. Grazing takes up most of their daily activities. Like most kangaroo species, they are mostly sedentary, staying within a relatively well-defined home range, but great environmental changes can cause them to travel great distances.

Kangaroos in New South Wales have weekly home ranges of 258–560 ha (640–1,380 acres), with the larger areas belonging to adult males. When forage is poor and rainfall patchy, kangaroos will travel 25–30 km (16–19 mi) to more favourable feeding grounds. Another study of kangaroos in central Australia found that most of them stay close to remaining vegetation but disperse to find fresh plants after it rains. The red kangaroo is too big to be subject to significant non-human predation. They can use their robust legs and clawed feet to defend themselves from attackers with kicks and blows. Dingoes and birds of prey are potential predators of joeys and a pack of dingos or a pair of wedge-tailed eagles can occasionally kill adults. Additionally, saltwater crocodiles can prey on kangaroos. Kangaroos are adept swimmers, and often flee into waterways if threatened by a terrestrial predator. If pursued into the water, a kangaroo may use its forepaws to hold the predator underwater so as to drown it.

== Behaviour ==
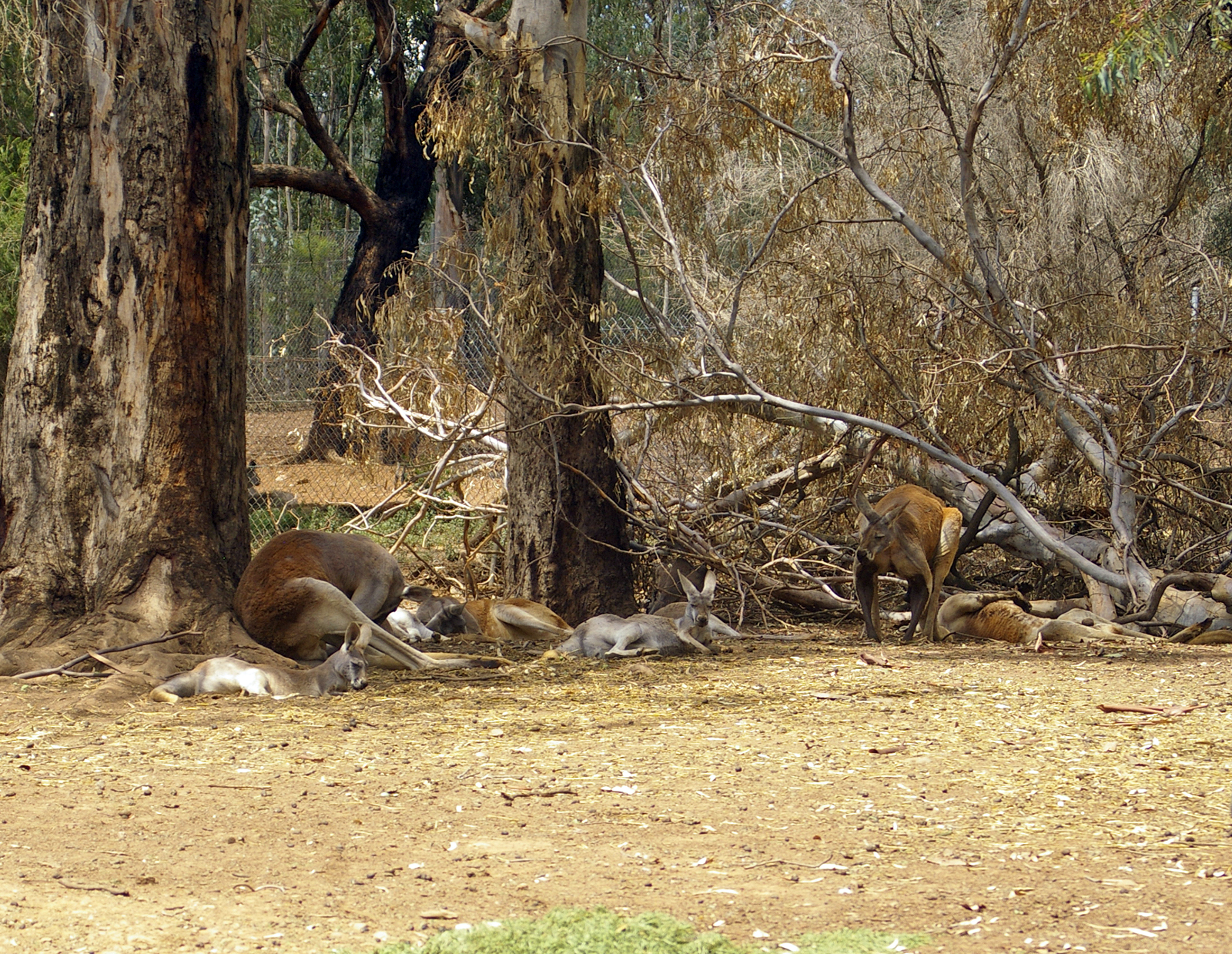
A mob of red kangaroos at the Wagga Wagga Botanic Gardens

Red kangaroos live in groups of 2–4 members. The most common groups are females and their young. Larger groups can be found in densely populated areas and females are usually with a male. Membership of these groups is very flexible, and males (boomers) are not territorial, fighting only over females (flyers) that come into heat. Males develop proportionately much larger shoulders and arms than females. Most agonistic interactions occur between young males, which engage in ritualised fighting known as boxing. They usually stand up on their hind limbs and attempt to push their opponent off balance by jabbing him or locking forearms. If the fight escalates, they will begin to kick each other. Using their tail to support their weight, they deliver kicks with their powerful hind legs. Compared to other kangaroo species, fights between red kangaroo males tend to involve more wrestling. Fights establish dominance relationships among males, and determine who gets access to estrous females. Dominant males make agonistic behaviours and more sexual behaviours until they are overthrown. Displaced males live alone and avoid close contact with others.

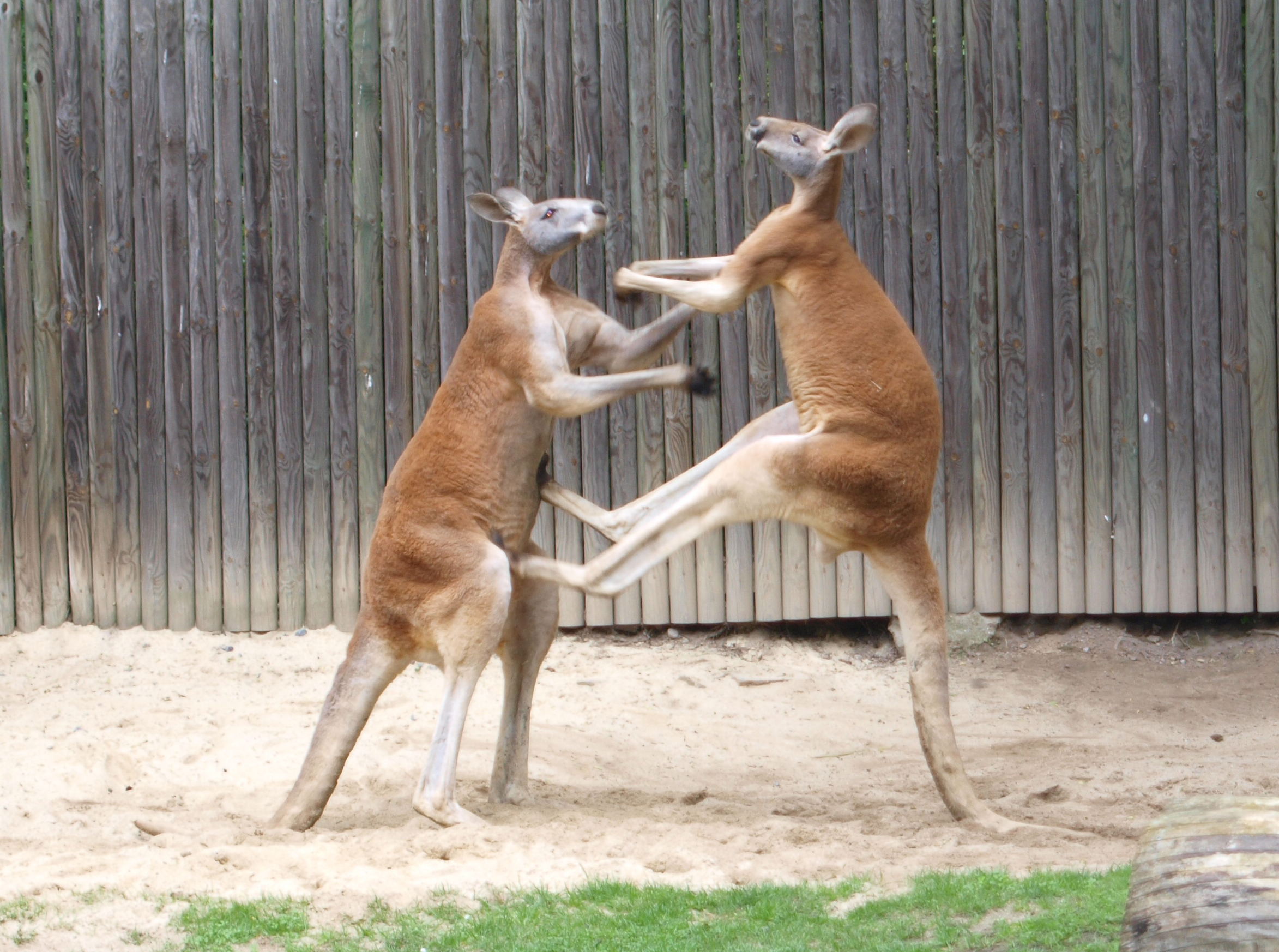
Two fighting male red kangaroos

=== Reproduction ===
The red kangaroo breeds all year round. The females have the unusual ability to delay the birth of their baby until their previous joey has left the pouch. This is known as embryonic diapause. Copulation may last 25 minutes. The red kangaroo has the typical reproductive system of a kangaroo. The neonate emerges after only 33 days. Usually only one young is born at a time. It is blind, hairless, and only a few centimetres long. Its hind legs are mere stumps; it instead uses its more developed forelegs to climb its way through the thick fur on its mother's abdomen into the pouch, which takes about three to five minutes. Once in the pouch, it fastens onto one of the two teats and starts to feed. Almost immediately, the mother's sexual cycle starts again. Another egg descends into the uterus and she becomes sexually receptive. Then, if she mates and a second egg is fertilised, its development is temporarily halted. Meanwhile, the neonate in the pouch grows rapidly. After approximately 190 days, the baby (called a joey) is sufficiently large and developed to make its full emergence out of the pouch, after sticking its head out for a few weeks until it eventually feels safe enough to fully emerge. From then on, it spends increasing time in the outside world and eventually, after around 235 days, it leaves the pouch for the last time. While the young joey will permanently leave the pouch at around 235 days old, it will continue to suckle until it reaches about 12 months of age. A doe may first reproduce as early as 18 months of age and as late as five years during drought, but normally she is two and a half years old before she begins to breed.

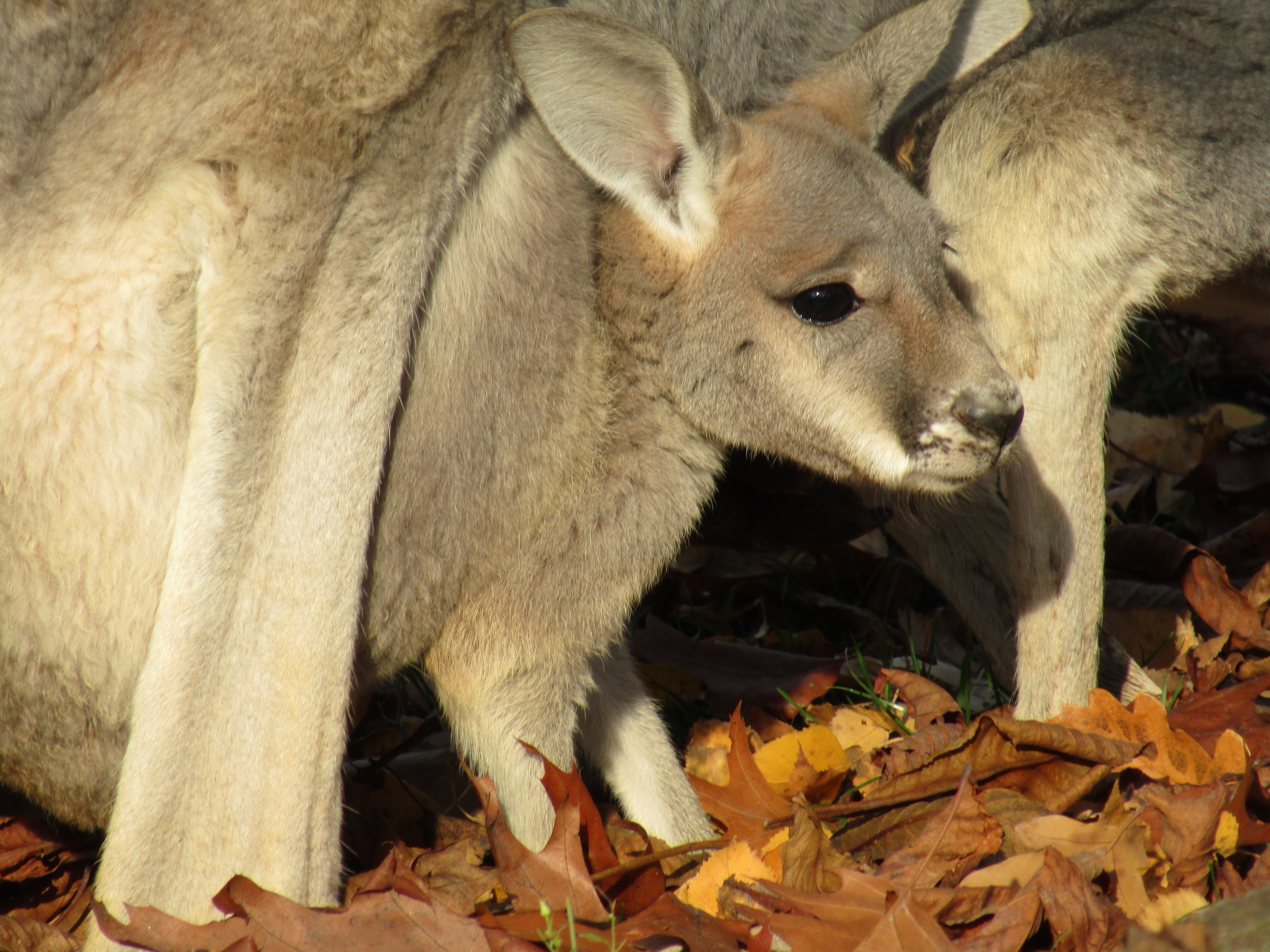
A joey in a pouch at the Dresden Zoo in Dresden, Germany

The female red kangaroo is usually permanently pregnant except on the day she gives birth; she has the ability to freeze the development of an embryo until the previous joey is able to leave the pouch. This is known as embryonic diapause, and will occur in times of drought and in areas with poor food sources. The composition of the milk produced by the mother varies according to the needs of the joey. In addition, red kangaroo mothers may "have up to three generations of offspring simultaneously; a young-at-foot suckling from an elongated teat, a young in the pouch attached to a second teat and a blastula in arrested development in the uterus".

The red kangaroo has also been observed to engage in alloparental care, a behaviour in which a female may adopt another female's joey. This is a common parenting behaviour seen in many other animal species like wolves, elephants, and fathead minnows.

== Relationship with humans ==
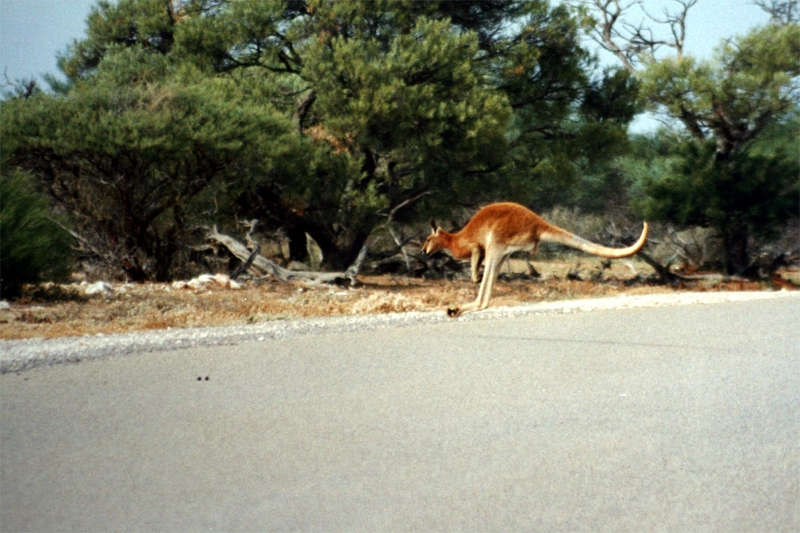
A red kangaroo crossing a highway

The red kangaroo is an abundant species and has benefited from the spread of agriculture and creation of man-made waterholes. Competition with livestock and rabbits poses a threat. They are also sometimes shot by farmers as pests, although in Queensland and New South Wales a permit is required.

Kangaroos dazzled by headlights or startled by engine noise often leap in front of vehicles, severely damaging or destroying smaller or unprotected vehicles. The risk of harm to vehicle occupants is greatly increased if the windscreen is the point of impact. As a result, "kangaroo crossing" signs are commonplace in Australia.

Peak times for kangaroo/vehicle crashes are between 5:00 PM and 10:00 PM, in winter, and after extended dry-weather spells.

=== Commercial use ===
Like all Australian wildlife, the red kangaroo is protected by legislation, but it is so numerous that there is regulated harvest of its hide and meat. Hunting permits and commercial harvesting are controlled under nationally approved management plans, which aim to maintain red kangaroo populations and manage them as a renewable resource. In 2023, over half a million red kangaroos were harvested across all of Australia. Harvesting of kangaroos is controversial, particularly due to the animal's popularity.

In 2000, 1,173,242 animals were killed. In 2009 the government put a limit of 1,611,216 for the number of red kangaroos available for commercial use. The kangaroo industry is worth about A$270 million each year, and employs over 4,000 people. The kangaroos provide meat for both humans and pet food. Kangaroo meat is very lean with only about 2% fat. Their skins are used for leather.

== See also ==
- Roo bar
- Roger (kangaroo)
