= Sustainable wildlife enterprise =

Farming system

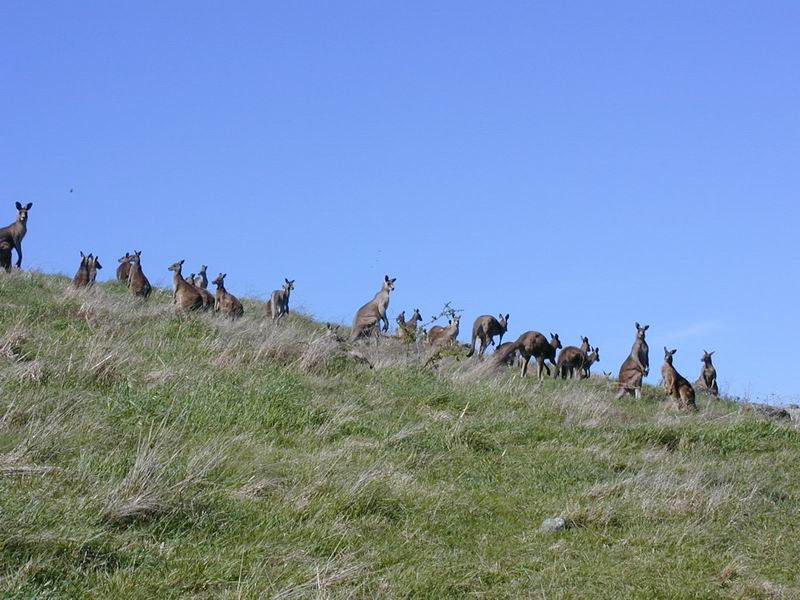
Grey Kangaroo Mob (Macropus giganteus)

A sustainable wildlife enterprise is a farming system incorporating sustainable use of wildlife to promote conservation. In Australia, landholders work together across boundaries to harvest or make use of (ecotourism) naturally occurring wildlife populations such as the kangaroo sustainably. Important to the concept is that biodiversity and environmental benefit occurs via alternative land uses. Attaching value to native resources through commercial development has the potential to provide alternative sources of income, especially in areas where traditional systems are no longer as profitable or environmentally sustainable.

The Sustainable Wildlife Enterprise system enables farmers to realise the financial value of native wildlife such as the kangaroo and encourages them to manage their land that supports the source of income without lowering total farm profitability – hence contributing to habitat and biodiversity conservation. The Sustainable Wildlife Enterprise system was developed in Australia, and is based on worldwide experiences.

== Background ==
Until primary production systems can put a value on habitat and conservation areas there will be more and more species loss. Conventional farming techniques have seen broad-scale environmental degradation in Australia’s rangelands, particularly during droughts where soil fertility and low rainfall limit natural production capacity. Where native wildlife and resources are given value and managed sustainably, there is a proven benefit for biodiversity and habitat.

Sustainable Wildlife Enterprises in Australia are based on wildlife management experiences from countries such as South Africa and Scotland. In South Africa - the commercial value of wildlife to private landholders makes the future of wildlife in that country far more secure than it is anywhere else on that continent. See Wildlife of South Africa.

In Scotland, deer stalking and red grouse (Lagopus lagopus scoticus) hunting occurs sustainably because hunting licences are owned by the landholder. This incentivizes to the landholder to protect their source of income and the habitat the animals live on.

Native species adapted to Australia's unique environment, allowing them to survive the climatic extremes and thrive with little impact to the environment. Kangaroos impact less on the environment than hoofed animals and emit substantially less methane. There is currently a sustainable kangaroo harvesting industry in place in Australia. See the Kangaroo industry. Landholders do not control or receive benefit from harvest of kangaroos on their land other than reduction of grazing pressure under this system.

== A Pilot Sustainable Wildlife Enterprise – Queensland, Australia ==
A pilot project is currently being run in Central-south Queensland (Maranoa). The cooperative owns and operates chiller boxes, and takes kangaroos from harvester properties of landholder members. Through improved information and training, quality of kangaroo products can be ensured through traceback and temperature tracking systems. The highly trained operatives within the cooperative also guarantee humane treatment of the animals. The cooperative assess kangaroo populations and develop and implement best-practice quality standards, which include standards of animal selection, harvesting, field dressing, transport, chilling and traceback from processors. Landholders benefit by the amount of kangaroo harvested on their land, and as a proportion of their investment and involvement.

There are a number of ways these cooperatives can be set up and the profits shared. Products from SWEs often need to have a market edge so landholders and harvesters can both benefit. The cooperatives need to prove biodiversity and environmental benefit, reduced carbon emissions, humane treatment of the animals, transparent operations and the highest quality.

Landholders benefit from better management of total grazing pressure and profits from sale of kangaroo products. Harvesters can benefit by gaining exclusive secure rights to properties and regular income, reward for implementing higher professional standards and access to training and development, resources, information, equipment, share in profits produced by ensuring market edge products. Meat processors can benefit with accurately described high quality products. For Landcare Australia groups and regional/catchment natural resource management bodies, the model offers options to meet their objectives of management of total grazing pressure), feral animals and weeds, diversification of incomes and socio-economic resilience.

== Carbon benefits ==
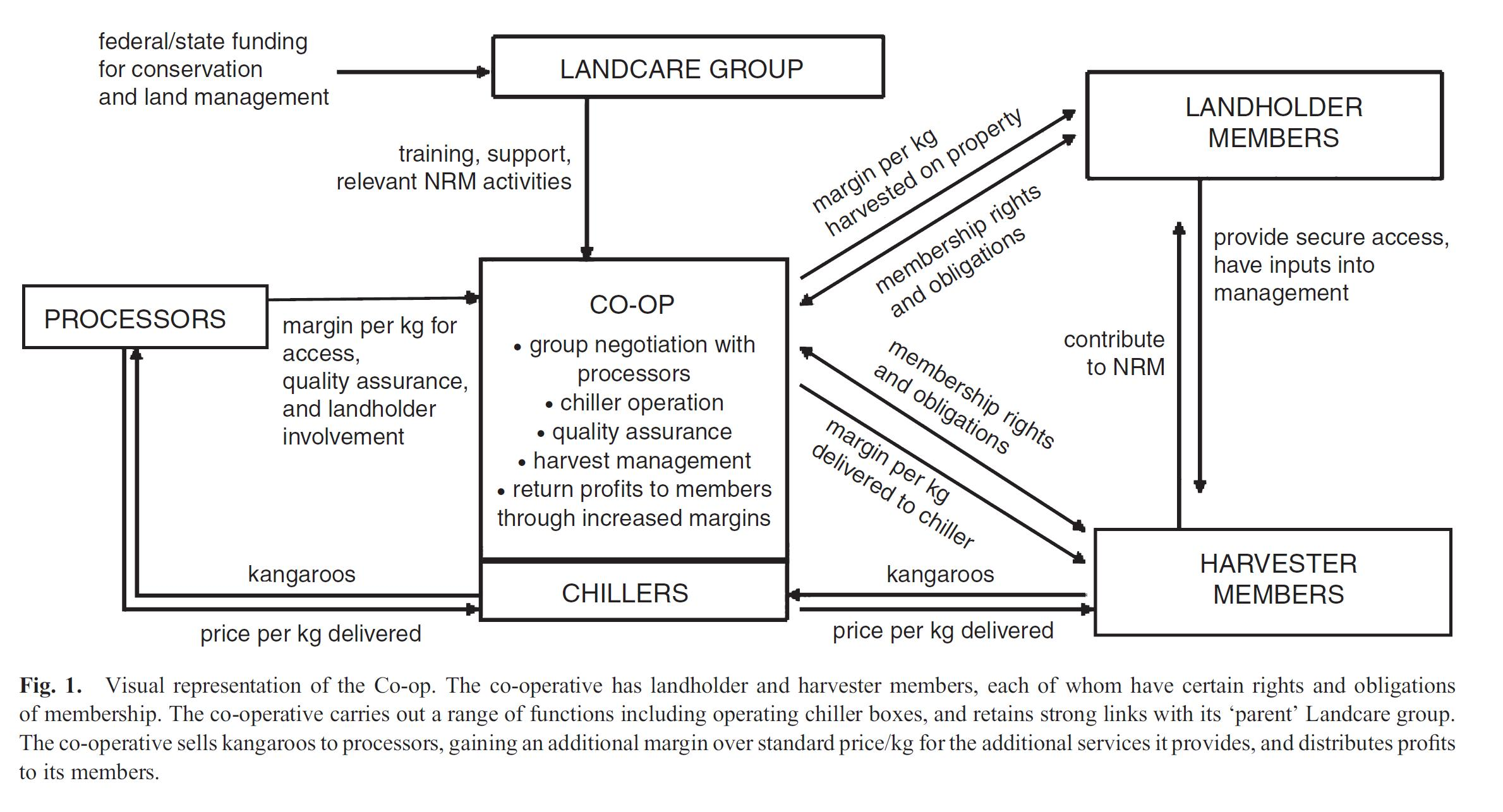
How a co-operative may work

The development of the Australian carbon market makes the prospect of profitable use of Australian wildlife within farming systems more viable. Methane from the foregut of ruminant livestock cattle and sheep constitutes 11% of Australia’s total greenhouse gas emissions. Kangaroos, on the other hand, have less impact on the environment and are non-ruminant forestomach fermenters that produce negligible amounts of methane.

As community groups call for reduced consumption of ruminant red meat to reduce carbon emissions, kangaroo meat consumption is a healthy, environmentally friendly alternative. Providing consumers with a red meat alternative (protein) that is associated with far lower methane emissions and minimal soil damage is an important environmental outcome.

Where kangaroo production partially replaces average sheep/cattle meat production, carbon credits can be earned. In the jargon of the carbon trade, sustainable kangaroo use in lieu of sheep/cattle provides landholders the ability to prove additionality and stop market leakage in protein production. There are also considerable carbon credit potentials in soil and vegetation as a result of managing the landscape for native wildlife (e.g. conversion to permanent native pastures).

== See also ==
- Kangaroo meat
- Kangaroo industry
- Maranoa, Queensland
