= Australian meat substitution scandal =

1981 food export scandal

The Australian meat substitution scandal of 1981 involved the widespread substitution of horse meat and kangaroo meat for beef in Australia. While the substitution primarily affected meat exported overseas, particularly to the United States, further investigations revealed that these, as well as donkey meat and pet food, had been packaged for human consumption and non-halal meat was sold as halal meat domestically in Australia.

== Background ==
Claims that meat processing companies in Victoria were substituting other types of meat for beef were brought before the Parliament of Australia by Cyril Primmer in 1977. Ian Sinclair, then Minister of Primary Industry, later announced that a police investigation of Primmer's claims found no evidence of meat substitution. Allegations of meat substitution were made in both the Australian parliament and the Parliament of Victoria over the following years. However, these claims were not seriously investigated by police.

== Investigation ==
The scandal unraveled on 27 July 1981 after a food inspector in San Diego, California, became suspicious of three blocks of frozen Australian boneless beef that were "darker and stringier" than beef should be. Tests revealed that they were horse meat, not beef, and further testing elsewhere in the United States revealed that some Australian "beef" contained kangaroo meat. Some of the meat had found its way into burgers at the Jack in the Box chain, leading to jokes about "Skippy burgers".

In response, the United States Department of Agriculture imposed stringent inspections on Australian beef imports. In 1982, the Australian government launched the Royal Commission into Australian meat industry to investigate. Exports of meat from processing plants in Victoria were also suspended for 30 days. The commission investigated 35 companies and released a report on its findings in September 1982. The commission found that "malpractices in the nature of commercial cheating have been widespread in the export industry." The report stated that companies routinely falsified packing dates and description of meats. It also found that a perception existed in the industry that this was tolerated by inspectors.

However, Appendix H of the report was not published at the time, and was only made available to the public in 2012, nearly 30 years later, after a Freedom of Information request first made by the Canberra Times in December 1982 was finally successful. The appendix noted that:

The flesh of donkeys, goats, kangaroos, buffaloes and horses, killed in the field and without regard to any consideration of hygiene ... was used indiscriminately to produce food for human consumption

Several meat distributors in Australia were found to have purchased low-grade cuts of meat intended for pet food, which they then repackaged and exported for human consumption. Non-halal meat was also substituted for halal meat. Justice Woodward noted that the scale of the operation could not be properly assessed due to attempts to cover it up, but said that the types of meat used as substitutes would be easily obtained in the eastern states of Australia.

Meat substitution was confirmed to have been occurring for at least five years. Sources within Victoria Police claimed that meat processors were being warned when to expect quality inspections by American officials.

A 1981 article in The Washington Post noted that the condition of kangaroos processed for meat did not meet United States standards. In particular, it stated that kangaroos were typically hunted in the field, and then transported hundreds of miles by truck to be processed. The royal commission's report also noted unhygienic conditions at slaughterhouses, including poor cleanliness and the presence of maggots at a slaughterhouse in Katherine, Northern Territory.

== Consequences ==
Ten companies referenced in the appendix had their food-export licenses revoked, effectively shutting nine of them down. Penalties for breaching export-license conditions were also increased from $2,000 to $100,000. The maximum fine at the time, though, for the perpetrators themselves was only $100. Richard V. Hammon, a principal at Profreeze, was convicted of "forging documents issued by or deliverable to Commonwealth authorities" and sentenced to four years in prison.

The scandal led to widespread criticism in Australia of the government and federal police. Critics of Prime Minister Malcolm Fraser claimed that his administration had failed to respond to the scandal until it reached international proportions. Australian Labor Party called for the resignation of Peter Nixon, the Minister of Primary Industry at the time of the scandal. Detractors of Nixon nicknamed the scandal "Slaughtergate", a reference to the Watergate scandal involving US President Richard Nixon.

At the time, concerns arose that the scandal would affect the beef-exporting industry, as the United States was the largest importer of Australian beef. It also affected Australian exports to Singapore and countries in the Middle East. This led to a series of reforms in Australian industry regulations. The 1982 Export Control Act was introduced to regulate the export of meat in the aftermath of the scandal. It introduced new legal requirements for meat-processing operations and required exporters to meet the food standards of countries importing their meat, in addition to Australian standards. The Australian Bureau of Animal Health was replaced by the Export Inspection Service (EIS) in 1982, eventually becoming part of the current Australian Quarantine and Inspection Service.
