= Kangaroo leather =

Material created by tanning kangaroo skin

Kangaroo leather is a strong, lightweight leather derived from the hide of the kangaroo.

Kangaroos are harvested. Both the meat and the hides are sold. Although hunting most species of macropod is prohibited, a small number of the large-sized species with high populations can be hunted by commercial hunters. This policy has been criticised by some wildlife activists.

== Applications ==
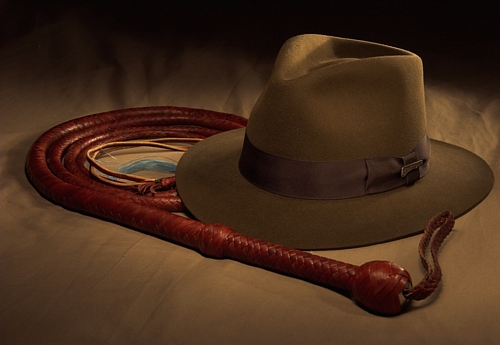
Whip made of kangaroo leather.

The leather is used in a wide variety of shoes. The unique structure of kangaroo leather allows it to be cut down to be very thin, but still retain strength.

Kangaroo leather is also popular in the manufacture of motorbike leathers and is used for many other applications such as car upholstery, military, football and American football boots, and fashion accessories.

Kangaroo leather is the material of choice for making whips, as the strips can be cut thin to keep the whip flexible, without sacrificing durability.

== Properties ==
Studies conducted by the Australian Commonwealth Scientific and Industrial Research Organisation (CSIRO) confirm that kangaroo is one of the strongest leathers of similar substance available.

When split thinly, kangaroo leather retains considerably more of the original tensile strength of the unsplit leather than does calf leather. When split to 20% of original thickness kangaroo retains 30 to 60% of the tensile strength of the unsplit hide. Calf split to 20% of original thickness, on the other hand, retains only 1–4% of original strength.

Kangaroo leather is lighter and stronger than the hide of a cow or goat. It has 10 times the tensile strength of cowhide and is 50% stronger than goatskin.

Studies of the morphology of kangaroo leather help explain its particular properties.

The collagen fibre bundles in cattle hide are arranged in a complex weaving pattern. The fibres are often at angles as much as 90 degrees to the skin surface. Cattle hide also contains sweat glands, erector pili muscles and a distinct gradation in elastin levels, concentrated in the upper part of the skin. Kangaroo hide on the other hand has been shown to have a highly uniform orientation of fibre bundles in parallel with the skin surface. It does not contain sweat glands or erector pili muscles, and elastin is evenly distributed throughout the skin thickness. This structural uniformity explains both the greater tensile strength of the whole leather and the greater retention of strength in splits. Bovine skin is much more complex in cross-section; in whole section it has many more weak points from which tears can start when placed under tension. In addition, when split the collagen fibres running at significant angles to the skin surface will be cut, becoming weak points.

== Environmental aspects ==
The Australian kangaroo industry produces a range of meat and leather products from animals harvested from the wild under strict government-controlled management plans intended to ensure that the harvest is sustainable and humane. A wide cross section of Australian ecologists support the kangaroo industry as being both sustainable and environmentally wise. Many argue that kangaroos, native to Australia, are a more environmentally friendly livestock option than introduced sheep and cattle. The two most important facets of kangaroos' better ecological fit than European agricultural animals relate to their adaptation to Australia's aridity.

Kangaroos have small chest development and so require less water to breathe than placental mammals, which usually must expand a diaphragm, losing more moisture in respiration. Kangaroos just make small pants while immobile, and in motion expand and contract their lungs effectively using their leg muscles. The belly flops up, contracting the lungs, and down, expanding them.

The kangaroo's paws are softer and do not compact the ground as hoofed cattle and sheep do. Instead, its hopping leaves very small bowl-shaped depressions in the surface of even dry clay soil, which let native grass seeds carried on the wind settle into them. The bowl shape concentrates any moisture that may fall into it into a wet point that the grass seed can use to germinate. Thus, kangaroos deplete the water table more slowly than cattle or sheep, and would even be viable in the absence of any bore water. The ecological arguments for kangaroos replacing sheep and cattle as arid land livestock are compelling, though they must be set against objections of kangaroos' lack of domestication and breeding rate. Kangaroos are eaten in most states.

== See also ==
- Kangaroo industry
