= Kangaroo meat =

Meats of Australasia's largest marsupials

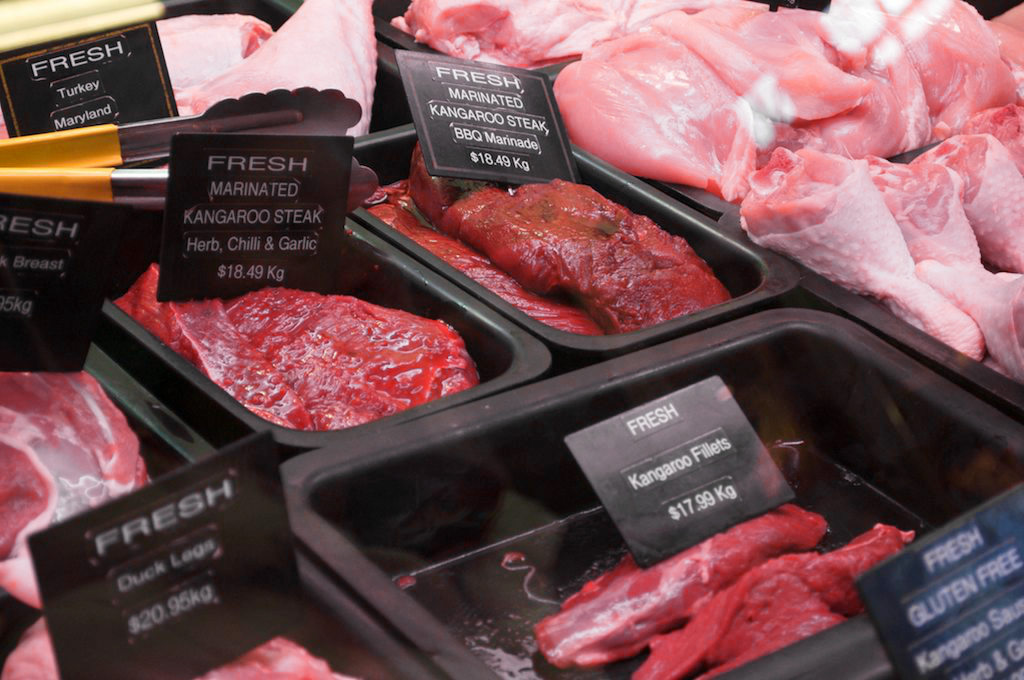
Kangaroo meat at the Queen Victoria Market in Melbourne

Kangaroo meat is produced in Australia from wild kangaroos and is exported to over 61 overseas markets.

The kangaroo has traditionally been a staple source of protein for many indigenous Australians for more than 40,000 years. Kangaroo meat is very high in protein (23.2%) and very low in fat (2.6%). Compared with other foods, kangaroo meat has a very high concentration of conjugated linoleic acid (CLA), to which are attributed a wide range of health benefits.

Kangaroo meat is also processed into pet food. Its low fat content prevents kangaroo meat from being cooked in the same way as other red meats, so it is typically either slow-cooked or quickly stir-fried.

== Production ==
Kangaroo meat production begins with the harvesting of wild kangaroos by licensed shooters in designated harvest zones. The kangaroos are killed humanely in accordance with the Australian Standard for the Hygienic Production of Wild Game Meat for Human Consumption (AS 4464:2007). Harvested kangaroos are bled and eviscerated in the field, with carcasses transported to refrigerated field depots or directly to licensed game meat processing plants.

Kangaroo meat is sourced from the four main species of kangaroos that are harvested in the wild. As of May 2024, Australia's commercial kangaroo industry is the largest commercial land-based wildlife trade on the planet. Kangaroo harvesting only occurs in approved harvest zones, with quotas set to ensure population sustainability. In Victoria, quotas were formally introduced in 2019, starting at 93,640 kangaroos and peaking at 166,750 in 2023, before decreasing to 111,575 in 2024 to balance ecological and management needs.

If numbers approach minimum thresholds harvest zones are closed until populations recover. Kangaroos are harvested by licensed shooters in accordance with a strict code of practice to ensure high standards of both humaneness and food hygiene. Meat that is exported is inspected by the Department of Agriculture, Fisheries and Forestry.

=== Processing facilities ===
Game meat processing plants are equipped to handle kangaroo carcasses under strict hygiene and food safety standards. Processing involves inspection of carcasses, trimming of contaminated or damaged parts, and further butchering into cuts such as fillets, steaks, and mince. Tools such as sterilized knives and mechanical saws are used to ensure precision and hygiene. The facilities adhere to hazard analysis critical control point (HACCP) systems to manage food safety risks.

=== Wild game meat transfer vehicles ===
Kangaroo carcasses intended for human consumption must be transported in specialised wild game meat transfer vehicles. These vehicles are licensed and fitted with hanging frames that ensure carcasses remain suspended to prevent contamination. They must be refrigerated to maintain specific temperature controls and are inspected regularly to meet the stringent standards set by AS 4464:2007. Vehicles are also equipped with facilities for sanitizing tools and ensuring proper handling during transport.

To further ensure hygiene, vehicles used for carcasses intended for human consumption cannot simultaneously transport those destined for pet food. Cross-contamination is strictly prohibited, and separate licenses are required for each type of transport.

=== Field depots ===
Field depots act as critical links in the supply chain, providing temporary refrigeration to maintain carcass quality until they reach processing plants. These depots are licensed and regularly audited to ensure compliance with Australian food safety regulations. Carcasses are tagged and logged to ensure traceability throughout the production process.

=== Pet food processing ===
Kangaroo meat not intended for human consumption is processed separately into pet food. Licensed facilities ensure this process complies with the Standard for the Hygienic Production of Pet Meat.

== Nutrition and products ==
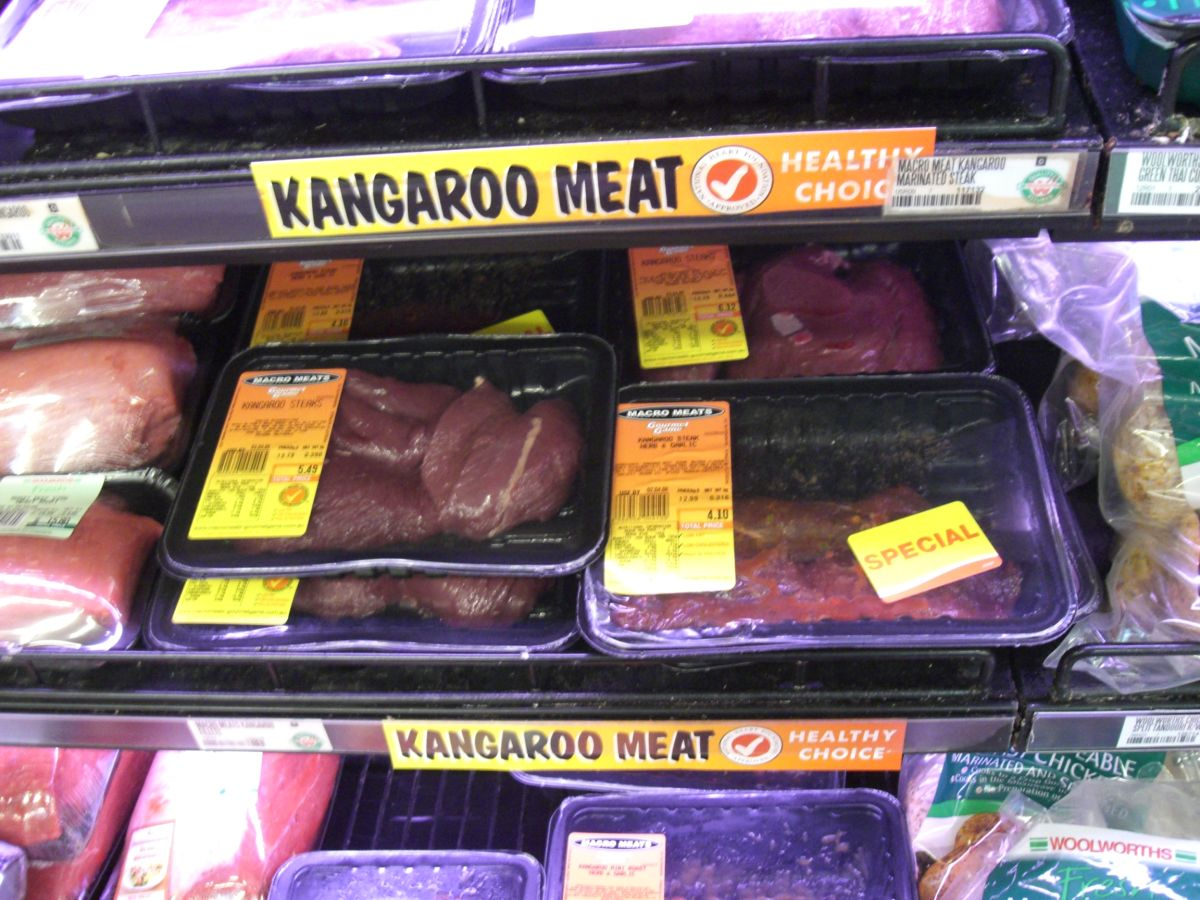
Kangaroo meat at an Australian supermarket

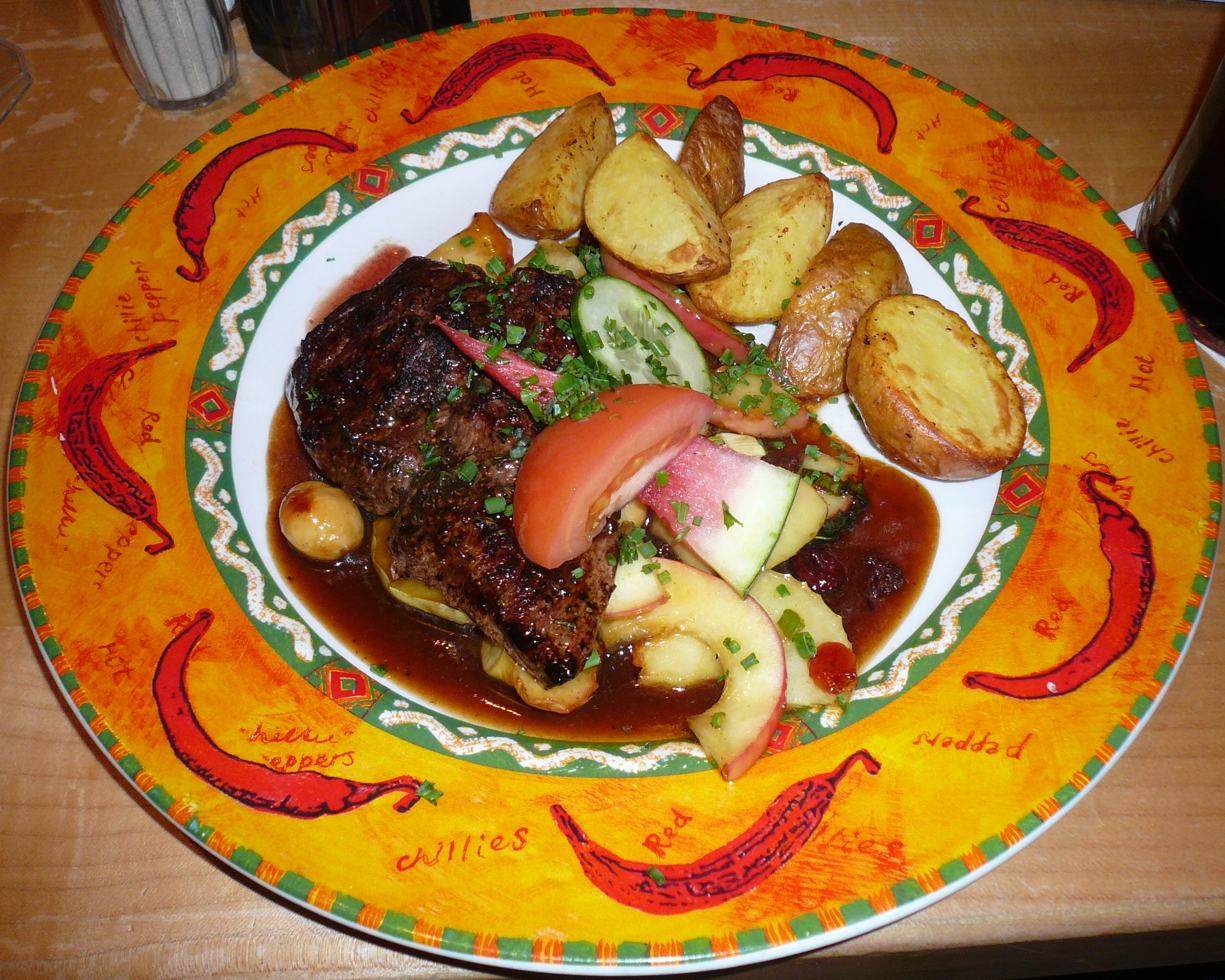
Kangaroo steak

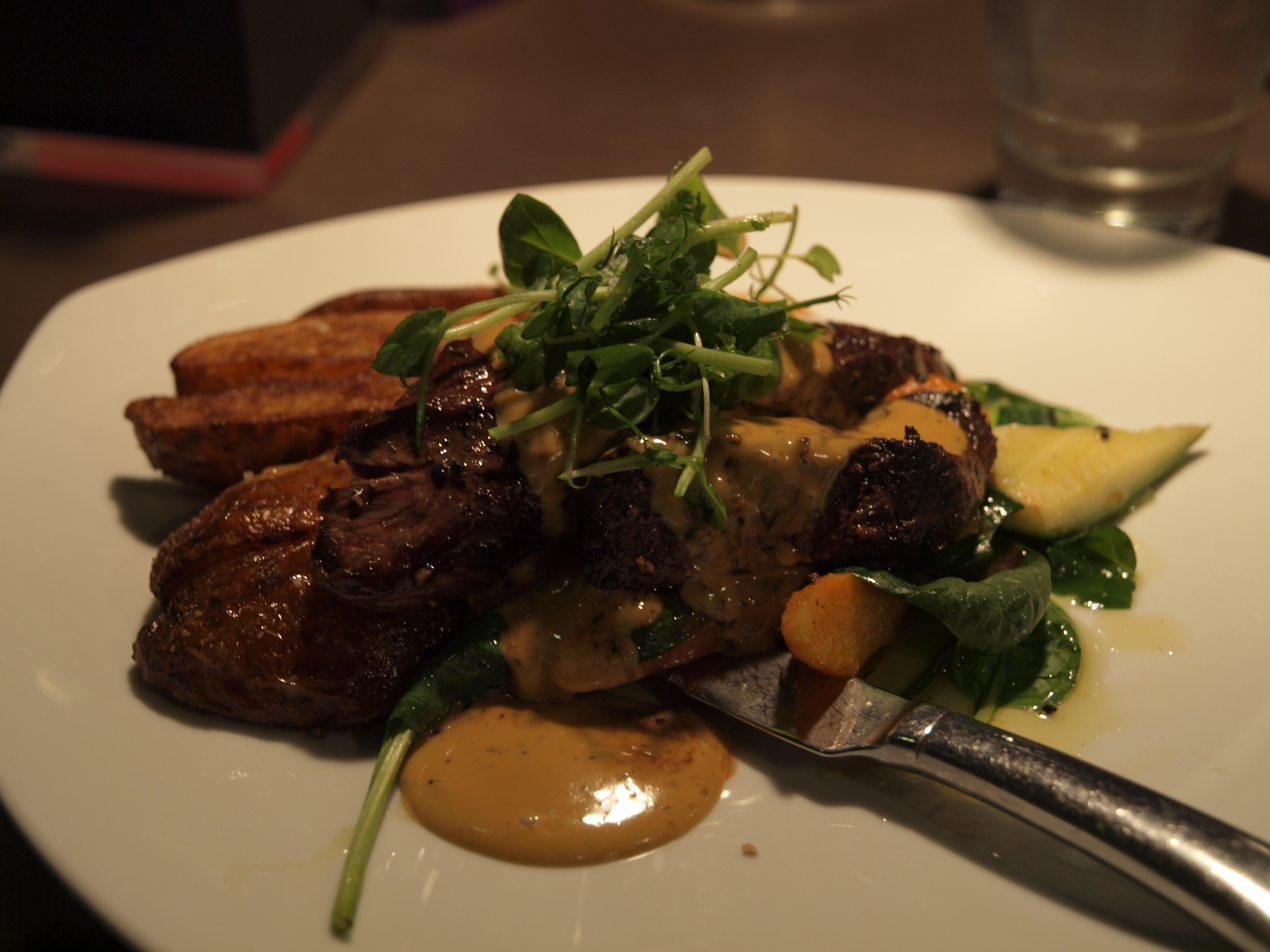
Kangaroo with thyme served in Helsinki, Finland.

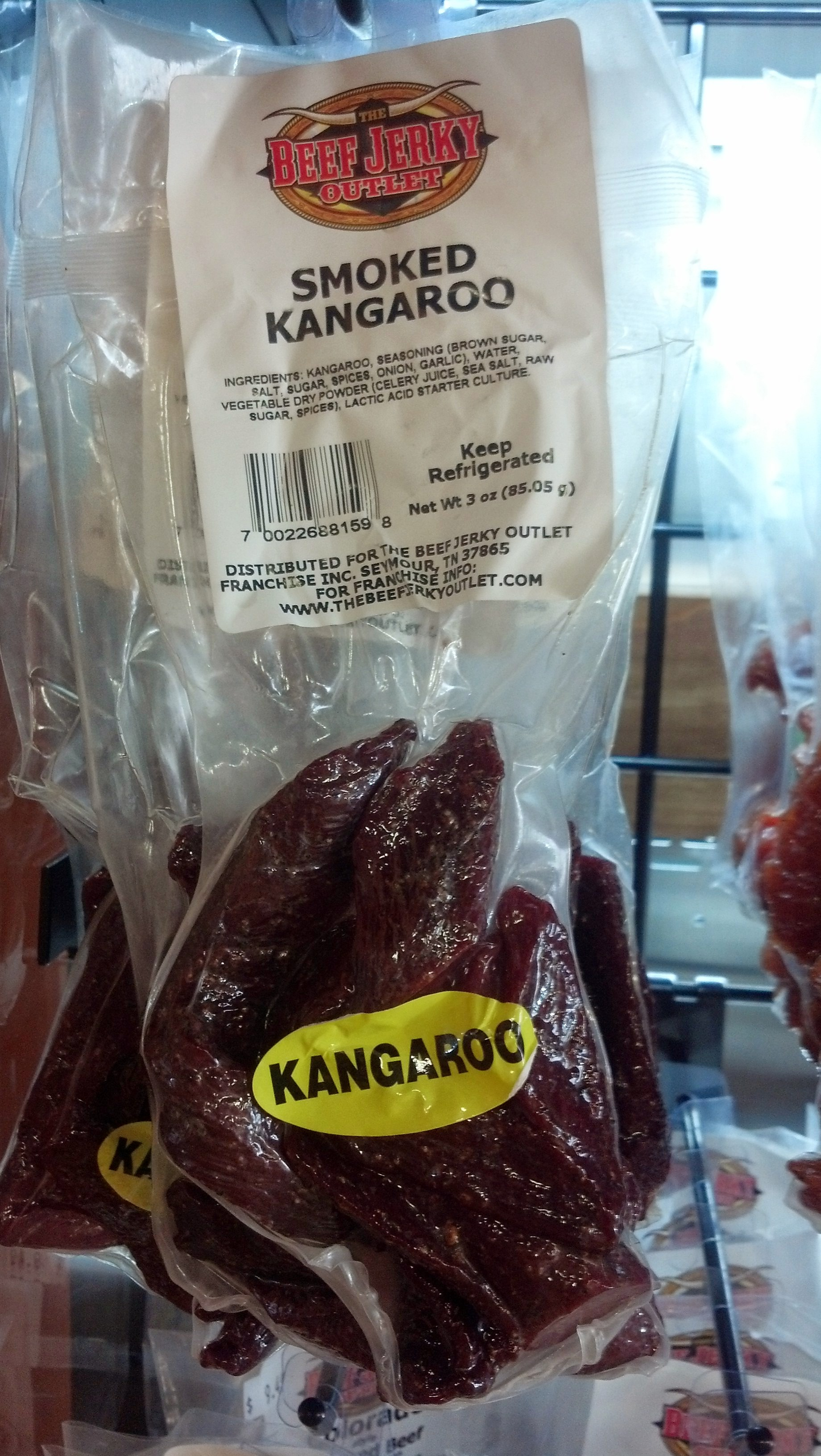
Smoked kangaroo jerky at a store in Richfield, Wisconsin, United States

Kangaroo meat has been a staple source of protein for many Indigenous Australians for over 40,000 years. Today, it is recognised for its exceptional nutritional composition and health benefits, distinguishing it from more commonly consumed meats like beef, lamb, and venison. Kangaroo meat is incredibly lean, with approximately 23.2% protein and only 2.6% fat, the latter significantly lower than in beef, which contains 19.0% protein and 15.8% fat. Its energy content is also much lower, at just 486 kilojoules (116 kilocalories) per 100 grams compared to 912 kilojoules (218.2 kilocalories) in beef, making it an ideal option for those seeking a high-protein, low-fat dietary choice.

Kangaroo meat has a very high concentration of conjugated linoleic acid (CLA) when compared with other foods. CLA has been attributed with a wide range of health benefits including anti-carcinogenic and anti-diabetes properties, in addition to reducing obesity and atherosclerosis.

In addition to being a rich source of protein and CLA, kangaroo meat contains all nine essential amino-acids in quantities that surpass the FAO/WHO standards for a complete protein. Compared to traditional meats, kangaroo meat offers higher levels of key amino acids such as leucine, lysine, and sulfur-containing methionine and cysteine, which are essential for muscle repair, metabolic health and overall wellbeing. Its superior amino acid profile contributes to its biological value of 99%, which is higher than that of beef, veal, or venison.

Kangaroo meat is also a nutrient-dense food, providing significant levels of essential vitamins and minerals. A 100g serving can supply up to 40% of the daily riboflavin requirement and 35% of the daily iron requirement, in addition to being a good source of thiamine, potassium, phosphorus, and zinc. The lipid composition of kangaroo meat is equally noteworthy, with up to 60% unsaturated fatty acids and 12.8% phospholipids, contributing to cardiovascular health and lower cholesterol levels. These features set it apart from fattier red meats like beef and lamb. With its superior nutritional profile, kangaroo meat offers a sustainable, low-fat, high-protein alternative to domestic animal meats.

Kangaroo meat was legalised for human consumption in South Australia in 1980. In New South Wales, Queensland, and Victoria it could only be sold as pet food until 1993. Kangaroo was once limited in availability, although consumption in Australia is becoming more widespread. However, only 14.5% of Australians were reported in 2008 as eating kangaroo meat at least four times per year. Many Australian supermarkets now stock various cuts of kangaroo, including fillets, steaks, minced meat and 'Kanga Bangas' (kangaroo sausages). Many Australian restaurants serve kangaroo meat.

Kangaroo meat has been exported since 1959, and 70 percent is now exported, much of it to the European market, particularly Germany and France. It is sold in two supermarkets in the United Kingdom and before a suspension on imports of kangaroo meat to Russia in 2009 it was widely used in Russian luncheon meats. California is the only U.S. state to have banned kangaroo products outright, as it has done since 1971, although with a hiatus from 2007 to 2016, when a moratorium was in place. In 2008, the industry was worth around A$250–270 million a year and provides around 4,000 jobs in Australia.

Kangaroo meat is also processed into pet food.

Cooked kangaroo meat tends to taste gamey, with a stronger flavor profile than beef or lamb.

== Purity and safety ==
Kangaroo meat is cleaner, not only compared to farmed livestock, but also compared to other wild game meats. Comprehensive data from the 2022–23 National Residue Survey (NRS) showed that no tested kangaroo meat samples contained detectable levels of pesticides, herbicides, fungicides, heavy metals or veterinary medicine residues above the limit of reporting. Contaminants such as lead, cadmium, and mercury were entirely undetectable, and persistent organic pollutants like DDT, aldrin, and hexachlorobenzene were also absent from all samples.

In the 2023–2024 report, 1 out of 25 samples had a detectable amount of one pesticide. The quantity of pesticide in this sample was less than half the maximum legal amount. 23 out of 25 samples had detectable amounts of lead.

Kangaroo meat demonstrates exceptionally low lead concentrations, measured at a mean of 0.01 ± 0.01 mg/kg wet weight, highlighting its cleanliness as a protein source. Wallaby meat follows closely with a similarly low level of 0.02 ± 0.01 mg/kg, while venison contains substantially higher lead concentrations at 0.12 ± 0.07 mg/kg, and quail exhibits the highest levels, with a mean concentration of 1.76 ± 3.76 mg/kg.

This cleanliness can be attributed to kangaroos' unique lifestyle and habitat. Kangaroos graze on native vegetation in areas removed from industrial or agricultural contamination. In addition to being free from historical pollutants, kangaroo meat also avoids modern contamination risks such as per- and polyfluoroalkyl substances (PFAS). These chemicals are increasingly found in seafood, processed foods, and water supplies due to industrial activity.

Kangaroo meat offers a clean protein source for health-conscious consumers. Its combination of a wild grazing lifestyle, clean environment, and safety testing ensures it remains free from the contamination pathways affecting farmed livestock, plant-based foods, and other wild game meats.

== Food safety standards ==
The Australian Standard for the Hygienic Production of Wild Game Meat for Human Consumption (AS 4464:2007) sets requirements for the hygienic handling, transport, and processing of kangaroo meat for human consumption. Compliance with this standard is mandatory for licensed businesses harvesting and processing kangaroo meat in order to meet state and territorial licensing requirements, as well as export regulations.

To meet these standards, field harvesters must follow strict hygiene practices. Vehicles used for harvesting must include facilities for hand washing, sanitising equipment, and providing potable water. Carcasses must be dressed hygienically, hung in clean, corrosion-resistant frames, and transported in a manner that minimises contamination and allows effective cooling. Sanitised tools must be used at all times, and contamination must be immediately trimmed from affected carcasses.

State regulations, such as the NSW Food Regulation 2015, incorporate these standards into licensing requirements. For export, the Export Control (Wild Game Meat and Wild Game Meat Products) Rules 2021 mandate compliance with AS 4464:2007, ensuring wild game meat meets international food safety standards.

These measures ensure kangaroo meat and other wild game products meet high safety and hygiene standards. The incorporation of hazard analysis and critical control point (HACCP) principles further ensures that the meat is safe for consumption and compliant with both domestic and international regulations.

== Population sustainability and environmental impact ==
Kangaroo meat is sourced from the four main species of kangaroos that are harvested in the wild. Although most species of macropod are protected from non-Aboriginal hunting in Australia by law, a number of the large-sized species which exist in high numbers can be hunted by commercial hunters. This policy has been criticised by some animal rights activists. On the other hand, the kangaroo harvest is supported by some professional ecologists in Australia. Groups such as the Ecological Society of Australia, the Australasian Wildlife Management Society and the Australian Mammal Society have stated their support for kangaroo harvesting. Such groups argue that basing agricultural production systems on native animals rather than introduced livestock like sheep offers considerable ecological advantages to the fragile Australian rangelands and could save greenhouse gas emissions.

Although it is impossible to determine the exact number, government conservation agencies in each state calculate population estimates each year. Nearly 40 years of refinement has led to the development of aerial survey techniques which enable overall populations estimates to be constructed. Populations of the large kangaroo species in the commercial harvest zones across Australia vary from approximately 25 to 50 million kangaroos at any given point in time.

Kangaroos are protected by legislation in Australia, both state and federal. Kangaroo harvesting only occurs in approved harvest zones and quotas are set to ensure the sustainability of kangaroo populations. If numbers approach minimum thresholds harvest zones are closed until populations recover. Kangaroos are harvested by licensed shooters in accordance with a strict code of practice to ensure high standards of both humaneness and food hygiene. Meat that is exported is inspected by the Australian Quarantine and Inspection Service (AQIS). In 1981, the Australian meat substitution scandal revealed that kangaroo meat intentionally mislabeled as beef had been exported to the United States and other countries.

Harvest quotas are set by state or territory governments but all commercial harvest plans must be approved by the Australian Government. Only approved species can be harvested and these include: red kangaroo (Osphranter rufus), western grey kangaroo (Macropus fuliginosus), eastern grey kangaroo (Macropus giganteus), and common wallaroo (Osphranter robustus). Sustainable use quotas are typically between 10 and 20% of estimated kangaroo populations. Total populations are estimated by aerial surveys and a decade of previous data and quota numbers are calculated by government and science organisations to ensure sustainability. Even though quotas are established by each state, very rarely does actual culling reach 35% of the total quotas allowed. For instance, "[i]n the 2015 harvest period, 25.9% of the commercial harvest quota (for Queensland) was utilised". When quotas are not utilised landholders in most states and territories resort to culling overabundant kangaroo populations. As kangaroos are protected, permits are still required but culled carcasses are generally either mass buried in large underground graves or left in paddocks to decompose and not utilised.

== Animal welfare ==
The kangaroo meat industry has attracted critical attention in Australia, the United Kingdom and the United States from animal rights organisations. Their concerns centre on the hunting process, in which all kangaroo meat for the global market comes from kangaroos harvested in the wild. In 2009 wildlife ecologist Dr Dror Ben-Ami for a University of Technology Sydney think-tank estimated that 440,000 "dependent young kangaroos" are bludgeoned or starved to death each year after their mother has been shot.

In the United Kingdom, the sale of kangaroo meat has prompted protests from animal welfare campaigners. The German retailer Lidl announced in 2018 that it would stop selling kangaroo steaks following "customer feedback". The Iceland chain, Tesco and Morrisons have previously stopped selling lines of kangaroo meat.

Some suggest that when such campaigns are successful in decreasing commercial harvesting rates, this leads to an increase in non-commercial culling of kangaroos, permits for which are available in every Australian state and territory to address issues associated with over-abundant kangaroo populations. Non-commercial culling can be carried out by non-professional shooters, unlike professional harvesters, who are required to undertake regular accuracy testing to ensure that humane standards are being met. It is more difficult to monitor non-commercial culling practices, and kangaroos killed under these permits may not be sold commercially and so are left to decompose in paddocks, rather than being used.

A study by the RSPCA suggested that around 40% of kangaroos are shot incorrectly (i.e., in the body, while the code of practice enjoins harvesters to shoot them in the head unless doing so is impractical). The RSPCA (2002) further warns that "sampling at the processor does not take into account the number of kangaroos shot in the field that were not taken to the chiller or processor", and that "accurate surveying of shooters is extremely difficult because of observer influence affecting the results." It is recognised that most kangaroo shooting cannot be observed; "in most circumstances where kangaroos are shot this is not feasible". There has been no large-scale independent study since.

== Kangatarianism ==
Kangatarianism is a recent practice of following a diet that cuts out meat except kangaroo on environmental and ethical grounds. Several Australian newspapers wrote about the neologism "Kangatarianism" in February 2010, describing eating a vegetarian diet with the addition of kangaroo meat as a choice with environmental benefits because indigenous wild kangaroos require no extra land or water for farming and produce little methane (a greenhouse gas) unlike cattle or other farm animals. Advocates of Kangatarianism also choose it because Australian kangaroos live natural lives, eat organic food, and are killed humanely. For similar reasons, Australians have discussed eating only the meat of Australian feral camels ("Cameltarianism").

== Name ==
There has been discussion from the kangaroo meat industry about attempting to introduce a specific culinary name for kangaroo meat, similar to the reference to pig meat as ham and pork, and calling deer meat venison. The motivation is to have diners thinking of the meat rather than the animal and avoiding adverse reactions to the eating of an animal considered to be cute. In 2005, the Food Companion International magazine, with support from the Kangaroo Industry Association of Australia, ran a competition hoping to find a name that would not put diners off when they saw it on a menu.

The three-month competition attracted over 2,700 entries from 41 nations, and the name australus was decided in December 2005. The name was penned by university professor Steven West, an American about to be naturalised as an Australian citizen. Other finalists for the name included kangarly, maroo, krou, maleen, kuja, roujoe, rooviande, jurru, ozru, marsu, kep, kangasaurus, marsupan, jumpmeat, and MOM (meat of marsupials).

The competition is not binding on the Kangaroo Industry Association, which has not moved to adopt the new name in any official capacity.

== Traditional Aboriginal use ==
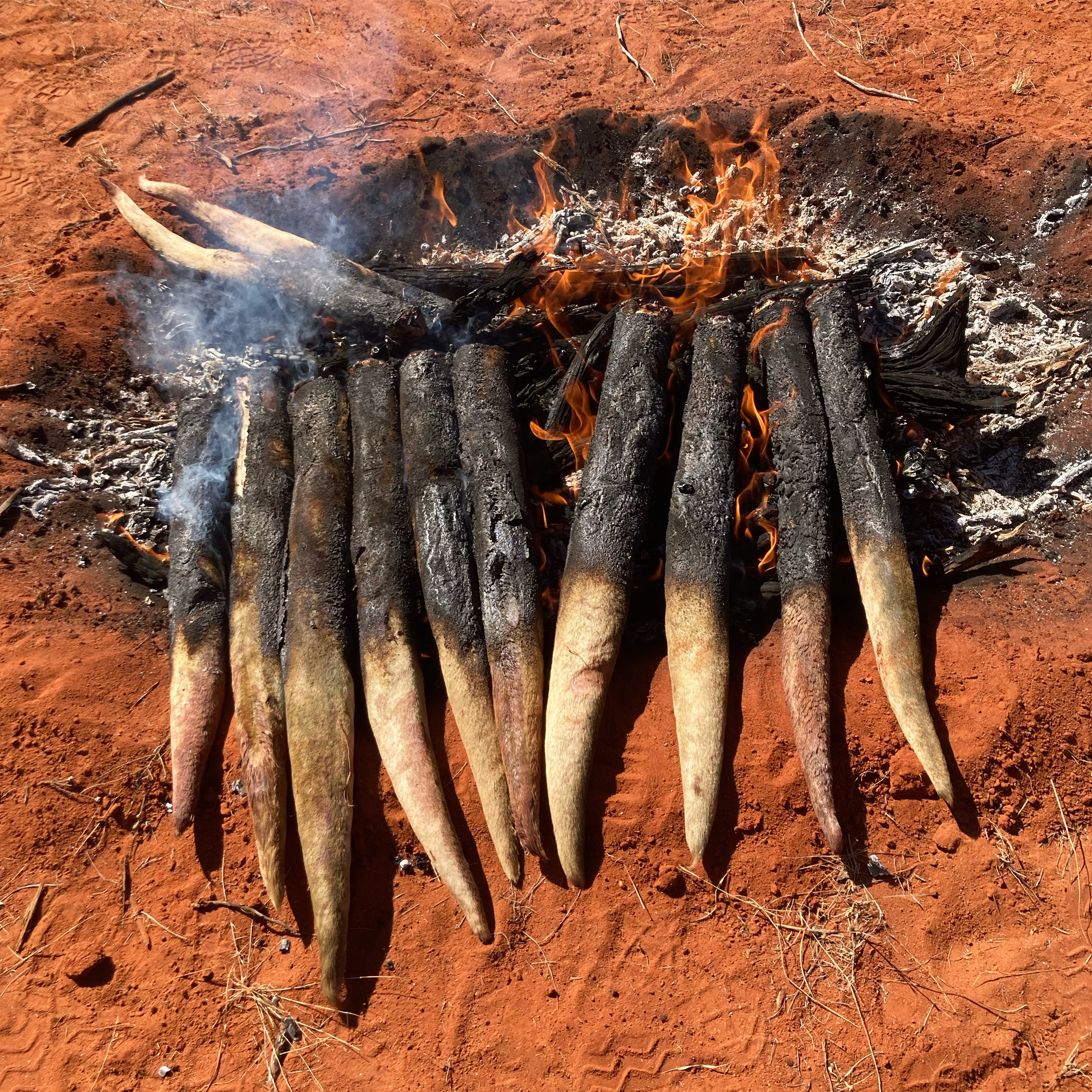
Marlu Wipu Tjuta - cooking kangaroo tails, APY Lands Central Australia.

Kangaroo formed an important part of many traditional Aboriginal diets.

Kangaroo is called Kere aherre by the Arrernte people of Central Australia:

You find Kangaroos in flat country or mulga country. In the old days, people used to sic their dogs on them and spear them. The milk guts are pulled out and a wooden skewer is used to close up the carcase. Then it is tossed on top of the fire to singe the hair which is scraped off, and then it's [put in a hole and] covered up with hot earth and coals. The tail and both feet are cut off before cooking. These are put in together with the rest of the carcase.

The Kangaroo is chopped up so that many people can eat it. The warm blood and fluids from the gluteus medius and the hollow of the thoracic cavity are drained of all fluids. People drink these fluids, which studies have shown are quite harmless. Kangaroos are cut in a special way; into the two thighs, the two hips, the two sides of ribs, the stomach, the head, the tail, the two feet, the back and lower back. This is the way the Arrernte people everywhere cut it up.

The Anangu, Pitjantjatjara and Yankunytjatjara peoples of Central Australia call Kangaroo "malu". They use malu mainly for meat (kuka) but other uses include materials for spear making. They are an important totem species. The Angas Downs Indigenous Protected Area Rangers are currently undertaking land management activities to increase this important species in the landscape. This process is named Kuka Kanyini – looking after game animals.

== See also ==
- Kangaroo industry
- Sustainable Wildlife Enterprises
