= Kangaroo industry =

Industry sourced from kangaroos

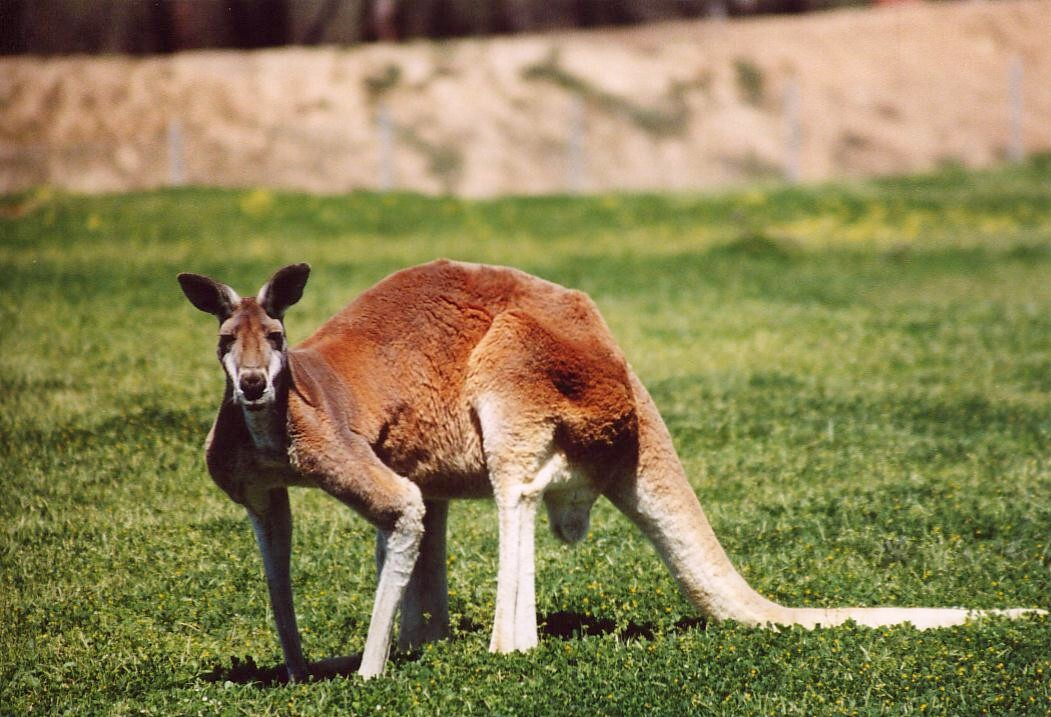
The red kangaroo is the largest species of kangaroo, as well as the largest terrestrial mammal native to Australia.

The kangaroo industry in Australia is based on the regulated harvesting of species of kangaroos.

== Products ==
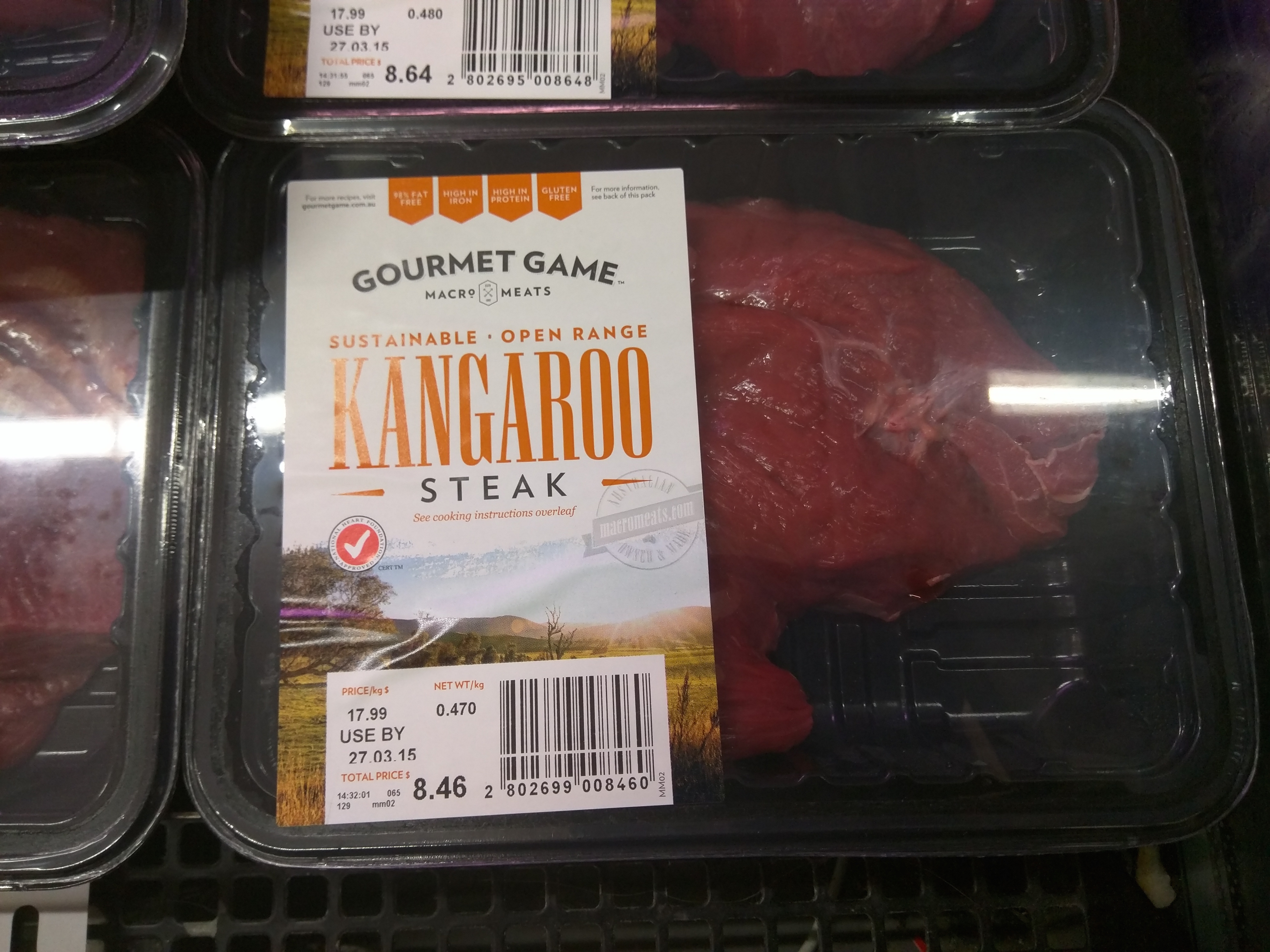
Kangaroo steaks at a supermarket

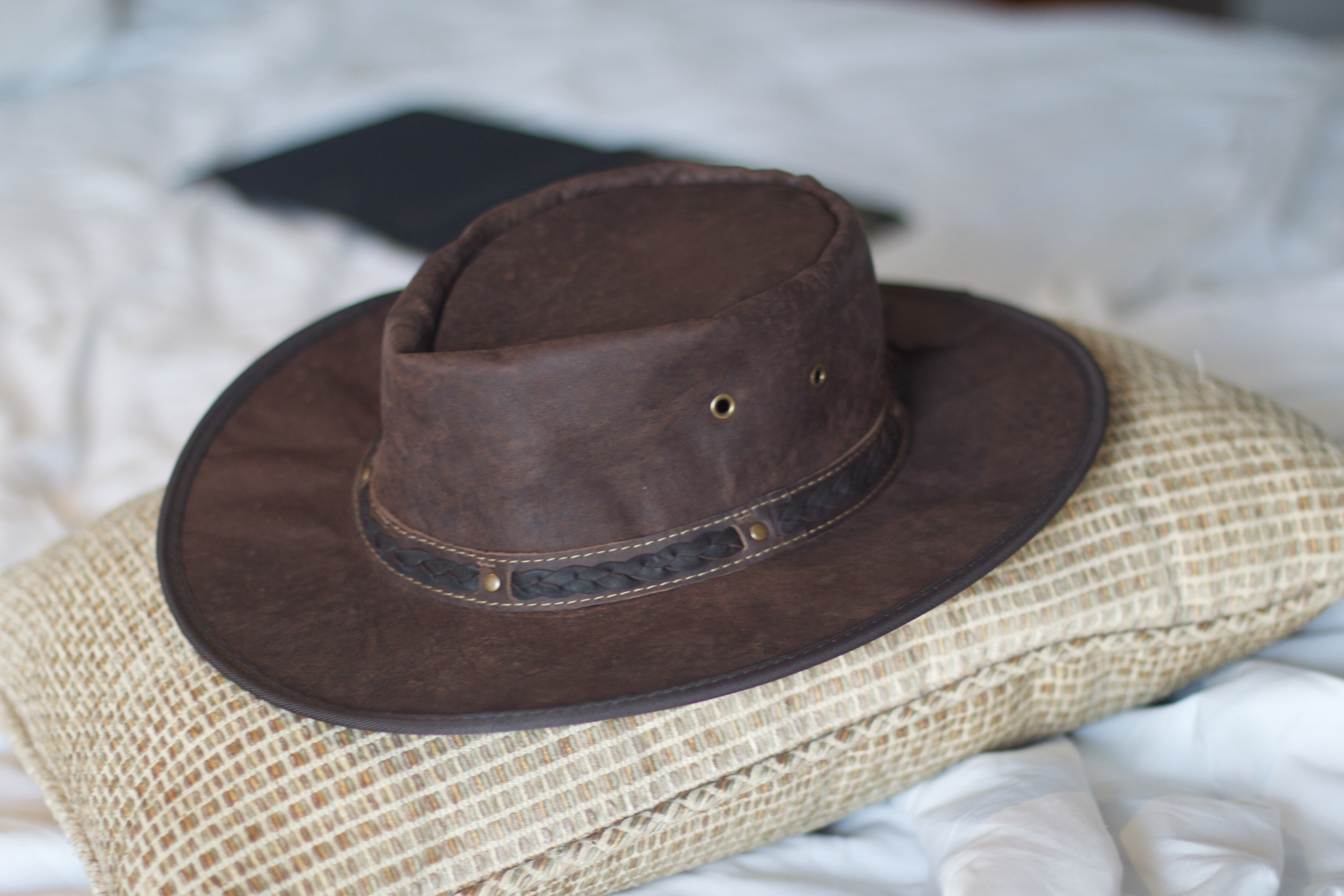
Kangaroo leather hat

=== Kangaroo meat ===
Australia commercially produced kangaroo meat since 1959. Annually about 3 percent of Australia's 50 million kangaroos are utilized for their meat, which is served in many Australian restaurants and sold in some supermarkets. It is also exported to over 60 countries overseas. Various pet food companies offer animal feed based on kangaroo or including kangaroo.

Since kangaroos emit smaller amounts of methane compared to cattle and sheep, their meat is sometimes advertised in this context. Australia's beef industry is estimated to account for about 11 percent of the country's carbon emissions.

=== Kangaroo leather ===
Various products are made from the skins of the animals. Kangaroo leather is a strong, light leather, which is more stretchy than goat or cattle but also wrinkles more easily and darkens faster. It is commonly used for shoes, motorcycle suits, handbags, wallets and in whips. Big brands usually market it as “k-leather”. Since many people see kangaroos as pest animals (and numbers have to be limited with annual culling) using the leather, when the meat is also utilized is seen as sustainable.

== Kangaroo populations ==
Of the 48 species of macropods (kangaroos) in Australia, only six abundant species are allowed to be used commercially.

The kangaroo industry, which represents a large amount of the commercial meat and leather traders, calls the shooting of kangaroos "commercial kangaroo harvest". They advocate applying under regulated quotas for the limitation of kangaroo populations, because they can overgraze, which can lead to both a loss of biodiversity and conflicts with farmers. As the kangaroos are not farmed, they spend their lives in their natural habitat. The shooting of certain quotas is permitted in six of eight Australian states and some additional areas with large kangaroo populations.

According to the kangaroo industry, the limitation of the kangaroo population is the key "to ensure conservation and animal welfare" while "health and safety standards are upheld". Each state government has its own kangaroo management plan to estimate their populations and outline the hunting quotas.

Most kangaroos are hunted in the arid grazing rangelands.

According to the Australian Department of Agriculture, Water and the Environment, each year about 3 percent of Australia's 50 million kangaroos are used for meat production, which means around 1.5 million animals. The meat of following species is exported as kangaroo meat;

- red kangaroo
- eastern grey kangaroo
- western grey kangaroo
- common wallaroo

=== Annual quotas ===
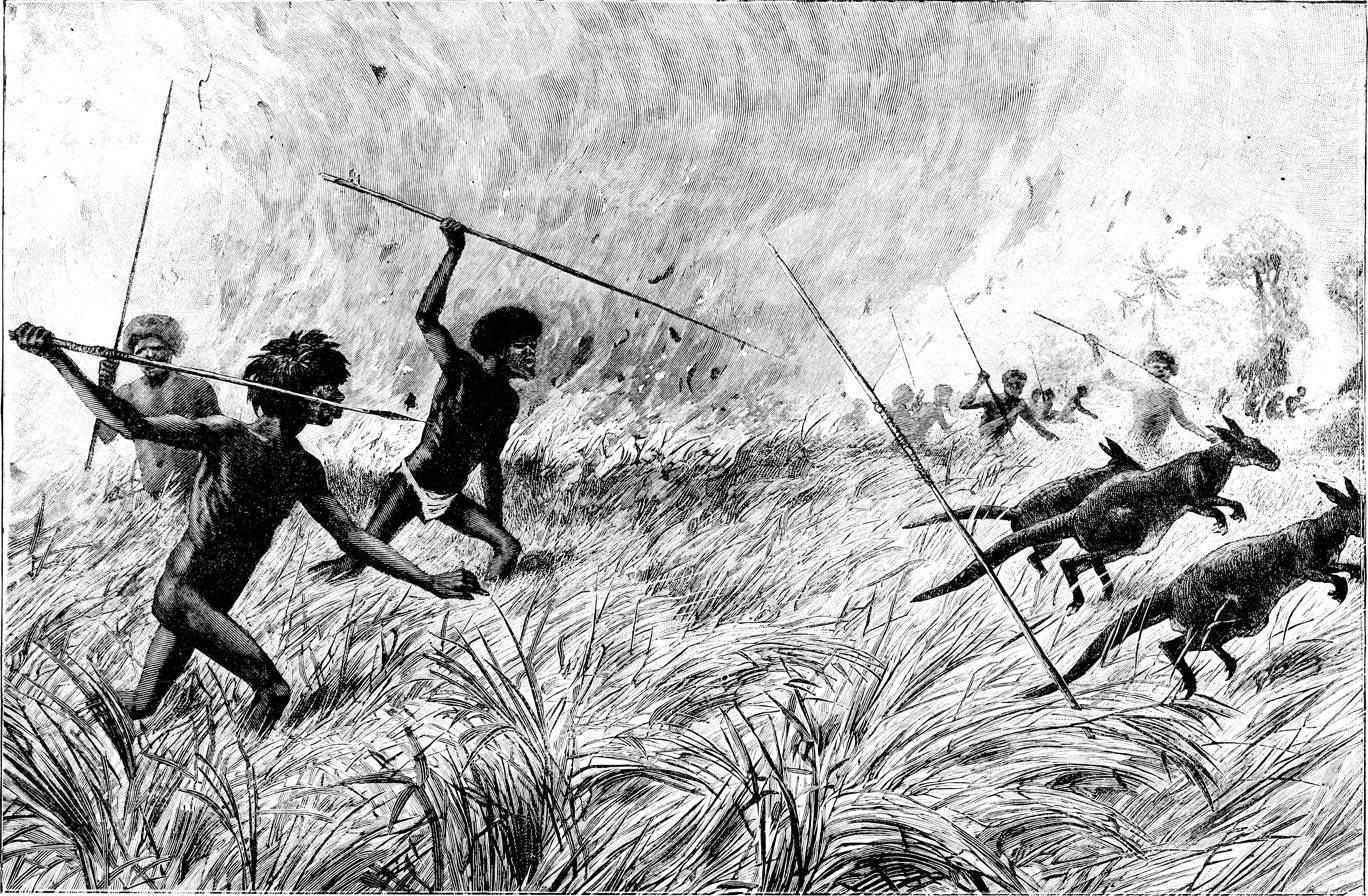
Historical illustration of Aboriginal Australians hunting kangaroos with spears

The National Parks and Wildlife Service South Australia authority must have a detailed management plan for the commercial reduction of the kangaroos, which is approved by the federal conservation department. Detail of the population monitoring and quota-setting controls must be renewed every five years.

After the kangaroo population has been estimated, the approved shooting quota is limited to a maximum of 15 to 20 percent of the total population. However usually only about 3 percent of the kangaroos are killed due to the limited demand of the market for kangaroo products. According to the reports published by the government Queensland used only 21 percent of its annual quota and New South Wales just 15 percent in 2014.

Only licensed shooters are allowed to kill kangaroos for commercial uses.

=== Licensing of kangaroo hunters ===
The official name for the "Professional Kangaroo Shooter's Licence" the Government of New South Wales came up with is "professional kangaroo harvester licence".

To purchase the tags issued by the authorities, each kangaroo hunter must be licensed as such. Rules for commercial hunters differ from those for private people, who want to obtain a license. In order to obtain a private license, mandatory training has to be attended. The training has to be provided delivered by government-accredited agencies and approved by the Australian Tertiary and Further Education agency in the appropriate State. Hunters are taught about regulatory controls and compliance requirements, the animal welfare controls, and the hygiene controls. They must then pass assessment and adhere to the governmental rules before they are allowed to apply for a license.

The 'National code of practice for the humane shooting of kangaroos and wallabies for non-commercial purposes' specifies the minimum high-calibre hunting weapon which are permitted, and requires all animals to be head-shot. Besides that the 20 pages include the direction to kill injured animals immediately and descriptions of how to kill "any dependent young" after a mother was shot (which means hunters are required to examine the pouch as well).

=== Environmental effects of limiting kangaroo populations ===
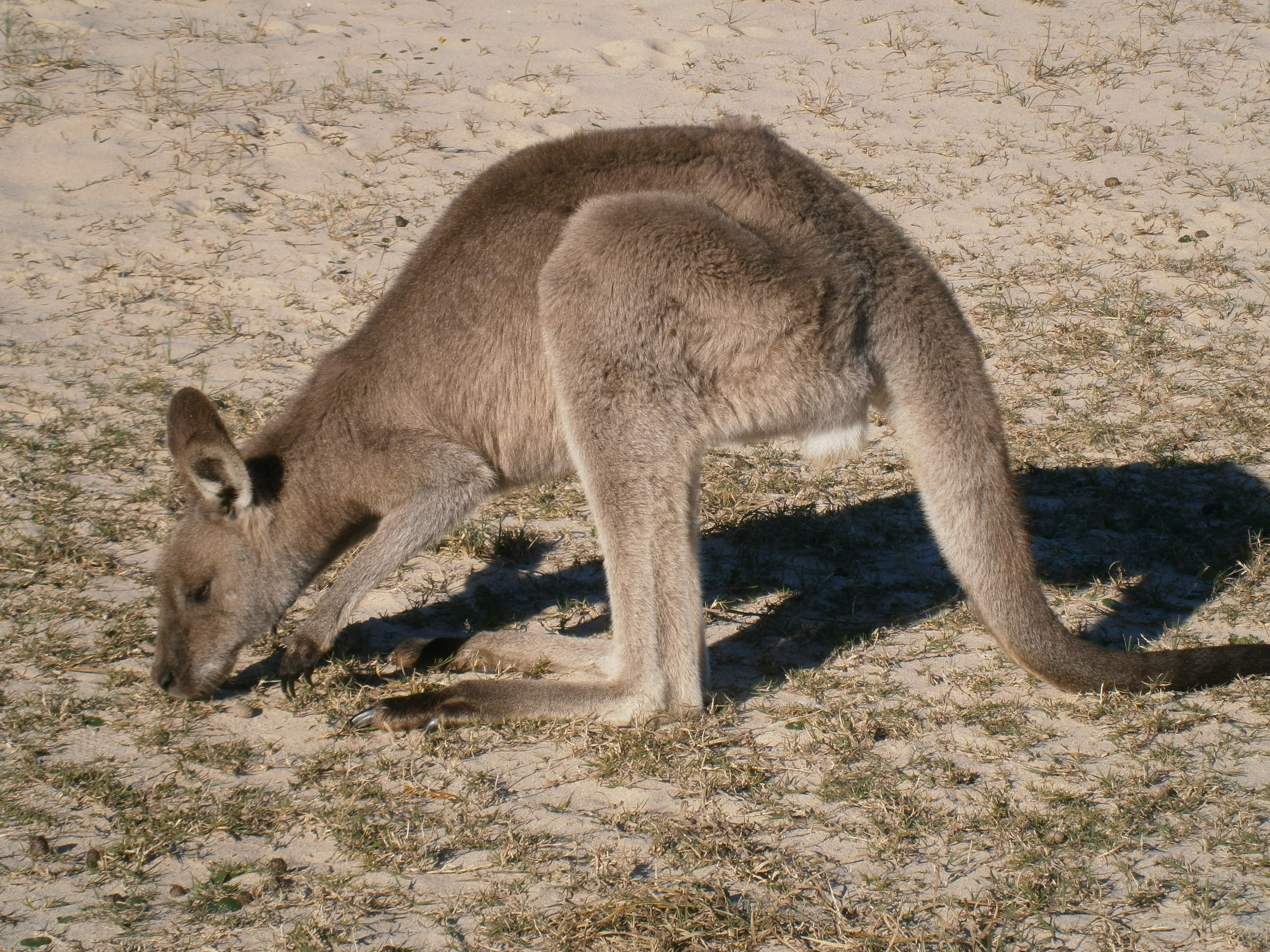
Eastern grey kangaroo: overgrazing can endanger the soil quality and the habitat of other animals

Eastern grey kangaroos reach a very high density in some areas of the Australian Capital Territory. The kangaroos are described as they compete for surface water, damage fencing and farm crops. Shooting kangaroos in rural areas in order to limit their numbers and the damage to farm assets, has not only been common practice for a long time, it continues to be practiced throughout Australia today. Recently concerns have arisen, regarding the impact the overgrazing by large kangaroo populations on other species and ecological communities. Due to overgrazing habitats can change due to soil erosion and a decline in water quality as recent studies have confirmed.

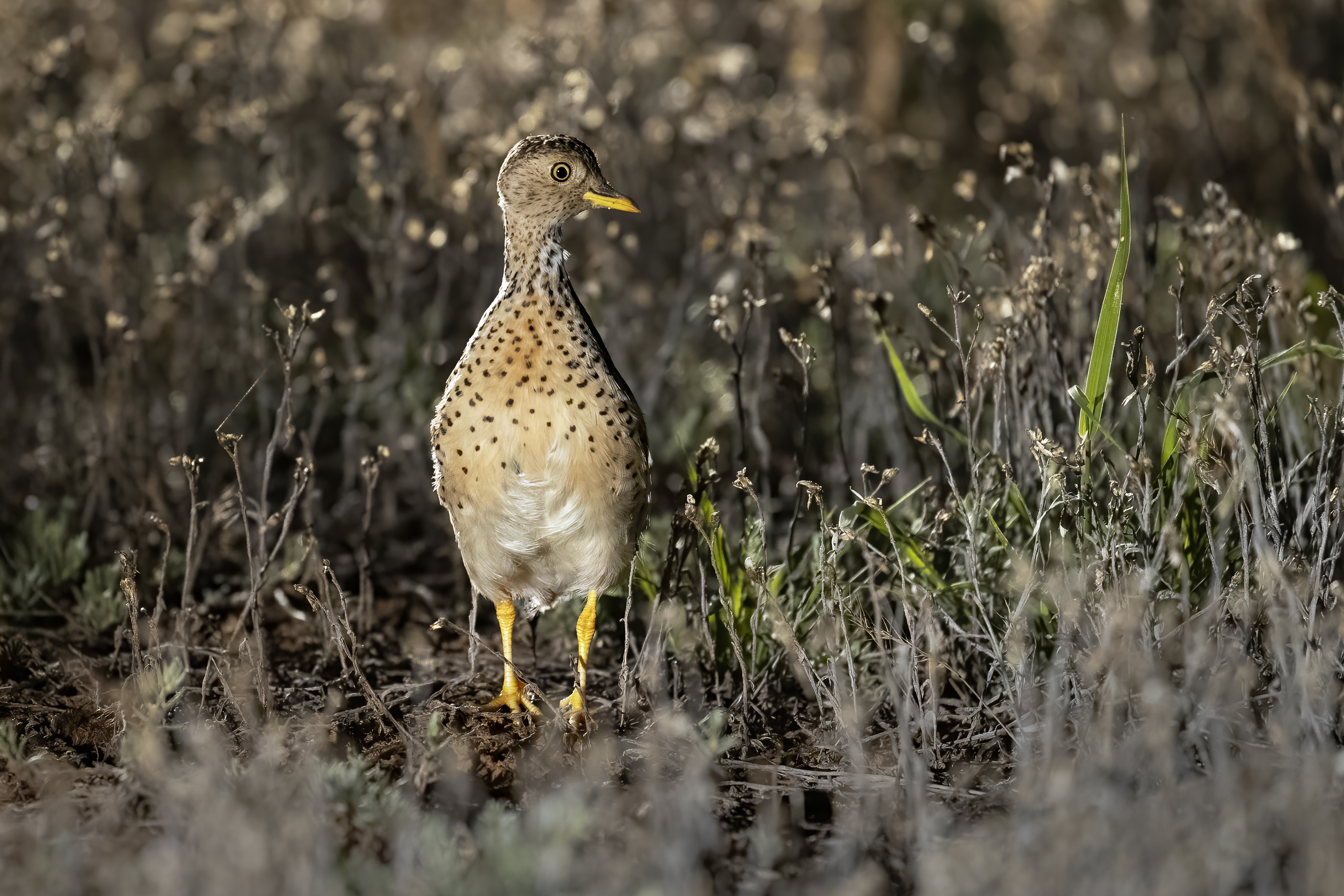
The habitat of the endemic Plains-wanderer is endangered by kangaroo overgrazing

As native animals, kangaroos were usually not considered a threat to the vegetation of their natural habitat. In 2022, a study by the University of New South Wales has illustrated that kangaroo overgrazing in nature reserves impairs soils and vegetation, and thus endangers the biodiversity. The impact of overgrazing includes that less rainwater can be absorbed by the soil.

Four conservation reserves in semi-arid parts of Australia were observed by the researchers. The critically endangered Plains-wanderer (″Pedionomus torquatus″), of which less than 1,000 birds still live in the wild, needs vegetation for both cover and food. Where kangaroo overgrazing leads to both a lower plant diversity and fewer plants, the consequence is less food and shelter for other animals. Fenced sections in natural reserves are especially designed to keep unwanted animals (such as kangaroos and rabbits) outside, so that the native vegetation can regenerate. Without these efforts some rare species, might not survive.

The conservation of the ecosystem calls for a balance, so if too many kangaroos have a negative impacts on it, this requires and justifies the management of the native kangaroo populations in conservation reserves. Dingos are the only non-human predators to limit the growth of kangaroo populations.

A project conducted by NSW Department of Agriculture, employed a field study and computer modeling techniques, to find out why kangaroo populations are so resilient to being limited in accordance with set quotas. The project showed that between 20 and 40 percent of any area will rarely be visited by a kangaroo hunters because the terrain is too rough or other limitations make it not economic to do so. These areas then serve as 'refugia' areas, in which the resident kangaroo population is never hunted and from which the population expands to repopulate areas in which kangaroos are shot regularly.

Several trials have indicated uncontrolled kangaroo numbers present a risk to plant biodiversity, especially when overgrazing occurs. Kangaroos can not be commercially hunted in National Parks; as a result, their numbers often rise to excessive levels which sometimes require culling programs to be used. In biodiversity monitoring done following a cull at Hattah-Kulkyne National Park in Victoria, increased abundance of 20 rare or threatened plant species was recorded in areas where kangaroo were culled compared with control areas (Sluiter et al. 1997).

=== Kangaroo use and a new ecological model ===
To date, agricultural development in Australia has largely been based on modified European systems, using European animals. In recent decades, this Eurocentric view has come under academic question. If Australians want to develop their own management systems, systems adapted to European conditions have to be replaced.

A project implemented by University of New South Wales aimed at encouraging the development of farm enterprises based on using native plants and animals (specifically kangaroos). The project intends to monitor the environment benefits that accrue from doing so.

== See also ==
- Kangaroo leather
