= Maranoa, Queensland =

Coordinates: 26°42′15″S 145°52′03″E

Maranoa Queensland
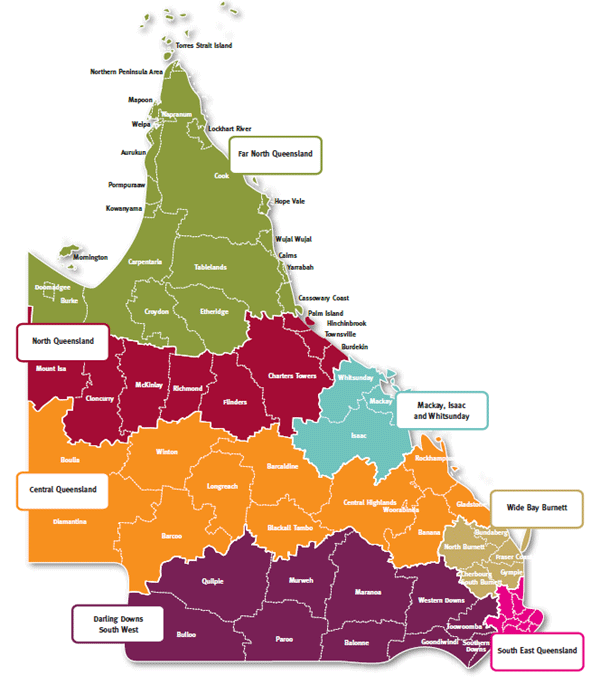
- Population: 25,000 (2006)
  - Density: 0.231/km^{2} (0.600/sq mi)
- Area: 108,000 km^{2} (41,699.0 sq mi)
- LGA(s): Western Downs Region; Maranoa Region; Shire of Balonne; Shire of Booringa
- State electorate(s): Warrego
- Federal division(s): Maranoa

The Maranoa is the name given to an area of southern Queensland, Australia, about 500 kilometres (kms) west of Brisbane. Some refer to the Maranoa as the Western Downs. The Maranoa is an eastern part of the larger, mostly arid South West region of Queensland. To the east is the agricultural region of the Darling Downs and in the west is the dry Channel Country.

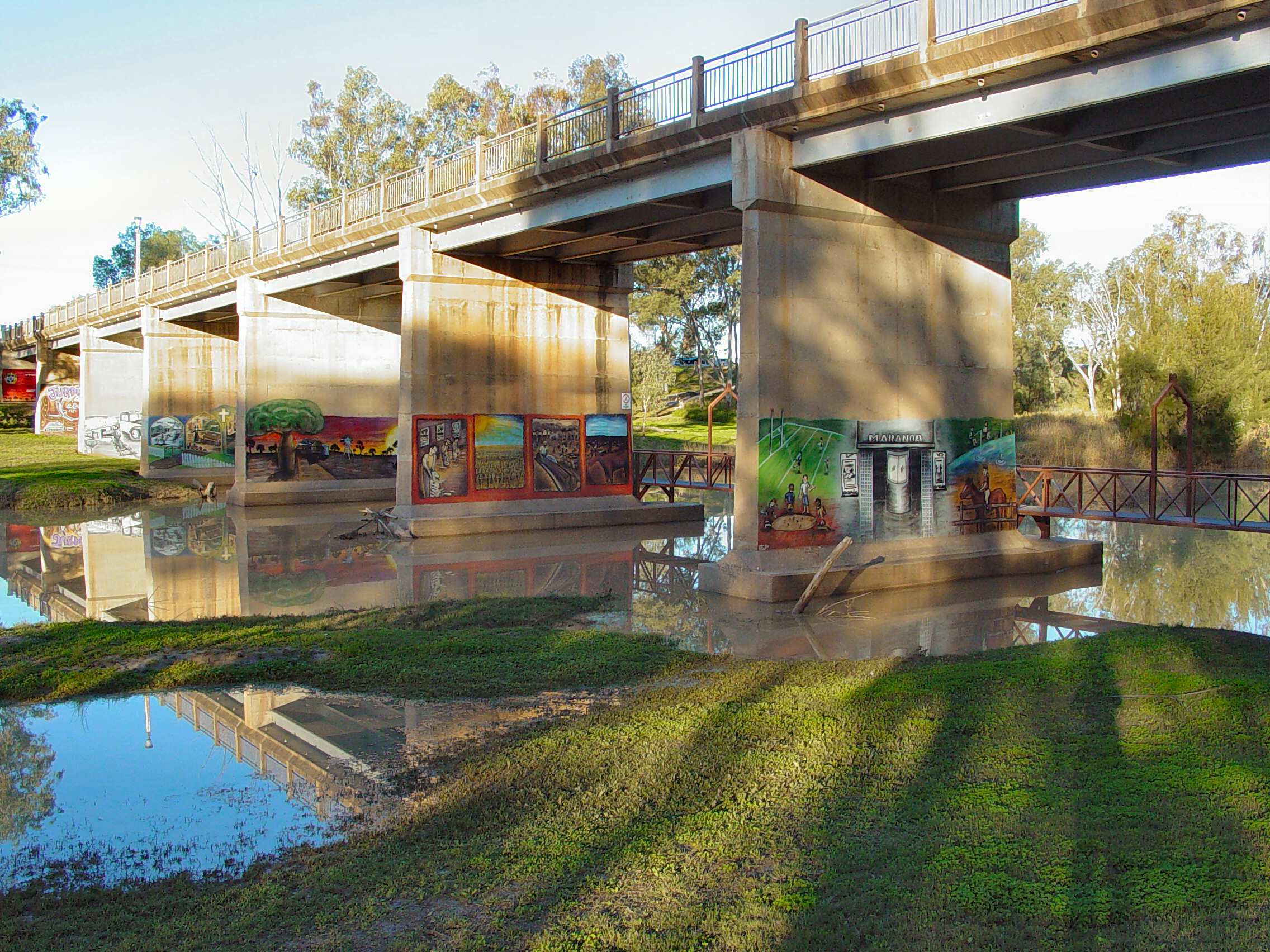
Maranoa River at Mitchell

The Balonne River and Maranoa River are the two main catchments in the Maranoa. The Warrego Highway, Carnarvon Highway and Balonne Highway are the major road routes across the region. The main towns are Roma, Condamine, St George and Goondiwindi.

Agriculture is the dominant industry of the Maranoa. The traditional agriculture is sheep and cattle grazing suitable for the rangeland landscape and sub-tropical climate of the region. A rural, country lifestyle predominates based around farming and livestock. The region is the location of Australia's first oil and natural gas discoveries. The expansion of coal seam gas mining has seen rapid infrastructure development and population growth in the region.

== See also ==
- Regions of Queensland
- Sustainable Wildlife Enterprises
