= Macropod hybrid =

List of hybrid marsupials

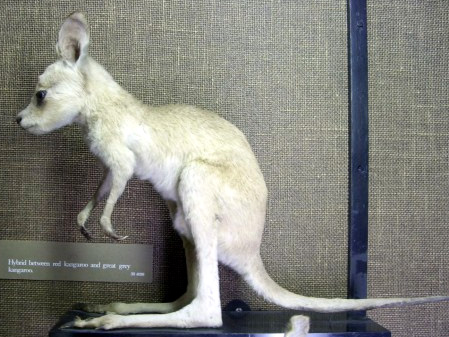
A hybrid (juvenile) of a red kangaroo and an eastern grey kangaroo, Rothschild Museum, Tring

Macropod hybrids are hybrids of animals within the family Macropodidae, which includes kangaroos and wallabies. Several macropod hybrids have been experimentally bred, including:

Male	Female	Result
Eastern wallaroo, Osphranter robustus robustus	Red kangaroo, O. rufus	Infertile female^{*}
Swamp wallaby, Wallabia bicolor	Red-necked wallaby, N. rufogriseus	Sterile male^{†}
Agile wallaby, N. agilis	Red-necked wallaby, N. rufogriseus	Sterile male^{†}
Tammar wallaby, N. eugenii	Black-striped wallaby, N. dorsalis	Sterile male^{†}
Western grey kangaroo, M. fuliginosus	Eastern grey kangaroo, M. giganteus	Sterile male and fertile female
Red kangaroo, O. rufus^{‡}	Eastern grey kangaroo, M. giganteus	
Tammar wallaby, N. eugenii	Parma wallaby, N. parma	
Tammar wallaby, N. eugenii	Pademelon, Thylogale species	

- * May have been so poorly fertile as to be considered sterile
- † Although the males had testes, they did not produce sperm and some were found to have Y-chromosome abnormalities.
- ‡ In-vitro fertilization used

Some hybrids between similar species have been achieved by housing males of one species and females of the other together to limit the choice of a mate. To create a "natural" macropod hybrid, young animals of one species have been transferred to the pouch of another so as to imprint into them the other species. In-vitro fertilization has also been used and the fertilized egg implanted into a female of either species.
