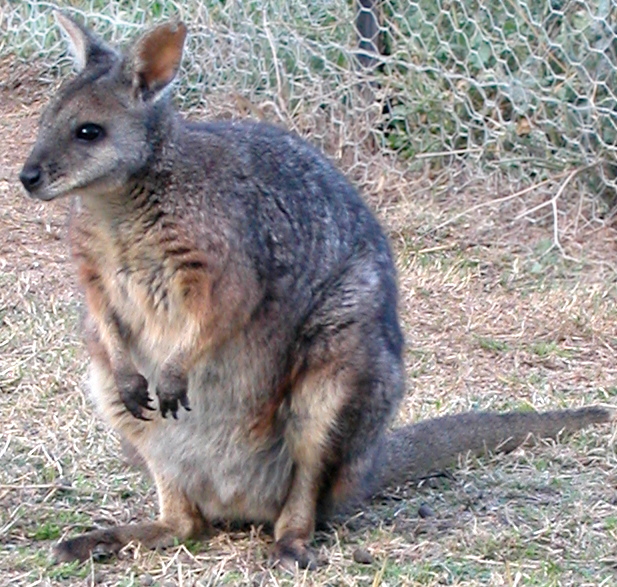

Conservation status
- Least Concern (IUCN 3.1)

Scientific classification
- Kingdom: Animalia
- Phylum: Chordata
- Class: Mammalia
- Infraclass: Marsupialia
- Order: Diprotodontia
- Family: Macropodidae
- Genus: Notamacropus
- Species: N. eugenii

Binomial name
- Notamacropus eugenii (Desmarest, 1817)
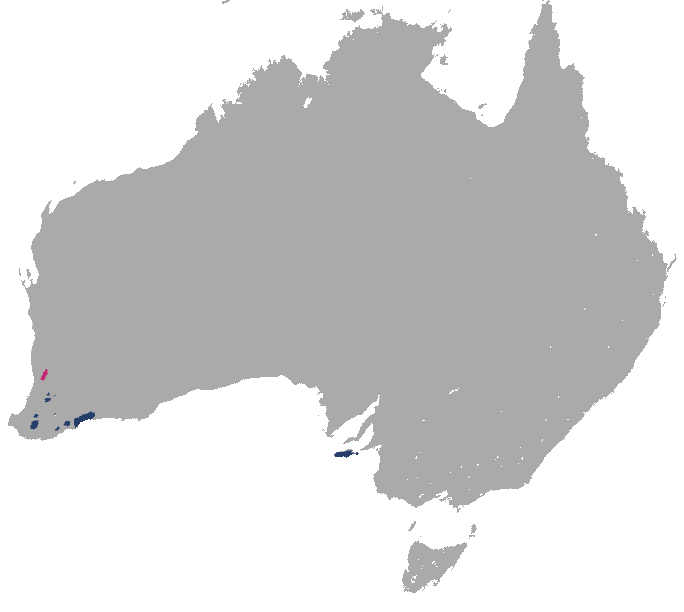
- Current tammar wallaby range. Pink areas are where they have been reintroduced.

Synonyms
- Kangurus eugenii Desmarest, 1817; Macropus eugenii (Desmarest, 1817)

= Tammar wallaby =

Species of marsupial native to Australia

The tammar wallaby (Notamacropus eugenii), also known as the dama wallaby or darma wallaby, is a small macropod native to South and Western Australia. Though its geographical range has been severely reduced since European colonisation, the tammar wallaby remains common within its reduced range and is listed as "Least Concern" by the International Union for Conservation of Nature (IUCN). It has been introduced to New Zealand and reintroduced to some areas of Australia where it had been previously extirpated. Skull variations differentiate between tammar wallabies from Western Australia, Kangaroo Island, and mainland South Australia, making them distinct population groups.

The tammar wallaby is among the smallest of the wallabies in the genus Notamacropus. Its coat colour is largely grey. The tammar wallaby has several notable adaptations, including the ability to retain energy while hopping, colour vision, and the ability to drink seawater. A nocturnal species, it spends the nighttime in grassland habitat and the daytime in shrubland. It is also very gregarious and has a seasonal, promiscuous mating pattern. A female tammar wallaby can nurse a joey in her pouch while keeping an embryo in her uterus. The tammar wallaby is a model species for research on marsupials, and on mammals in general. Its genome was sequenced in 2011.

== Taxonomy and classification ==
The tammar wallaby was seen in the Houtman Abrolhos off Western Australia by survivors of the 1629 Batavia shipwreck, and recorded by François Pelsaert in his 1629 Ongeluckige Voyagie. It was first described in 1817 by the French naturalist Anselme Gaëtan Desmarest, who gave it the name eugenii based on a specimen found on an island then known as Ile Eugene in the Nuyts Archipelago off South Australia, which is now known as St. Peter Island. The island's French name was given in honour of Eugene Hamelin, captain of the ship Naturaliste; whose name is now the specific name of the tammar wallaby. The common name of the animal is derived from the thickets of the shrub locally known as tamma (Allocasuarina campestris) that sheltered it in Western Australia. It is also known as the dama wallaby or darma wallaby.

The tammar wallaby is traditionally classified together with the kangaroos, wallaroos and several other species of wallaby in the genus Macropus, and in the subgenus Notamacropus with the other brush wallabies, all of which have a facial stripe. However, some authors have proposed elevating the three subgenera of Macropus, Macropus (sensu stricto), Osphranter, and Notamacropus into distinct genera, making the tammar's specific name Notamacropus eugenii. This has been supported by genetic studies.

Fossil evidence of the tammar wallaby exists from the Late Pleistocene Era – remains were found in the Naracoorte Caves. The mainland and island-dwelling tammar wallabies split from each other 7,000–15,000 years ago, while the South Australian and Western Australian animals diverged around 50,000 years ago. The extirpated tammar wallabies on Flinders Island were greyer in colour with thinner skulls than present-day Kangaroo Island tammars, which are in turn larger than the East and West Wallabi Islands animals. The island tammar wallabies were once thought to be a separate species from the mainland population.

A 1991 examination of tammar wallaby skulls from different parts of the species' range found that the populations can be divided into three distinct groups: one group consisting of the populations from mainland Western Australia, East and West Wallabi Islands, Garden Island and Middle Island; a second group consisting of the populations from Flinders Island, 19th-century mainland Southern Australia and New Zealand; and a third group consisting of the population from Kangaroo Island. The Western Australia Department of Environment and Conservation listed these populations as the subspecies Macropus eugenii derbianus, M. e. eugenii and M. e. decres, respectively.

A 2017 study found many genetic differences between tammars from Western and South Australia and comparably little between the Kangaroo island and introduced New Zealand tammars. The researchers proposed dividing the species into two subspecies; the subspecific name eugenii for South Australian tammars and derbianus for those from Western Australia.

Phylogeny of the tammar wallaby among close relatives

Based on Dodt and collages (2017)

- Macropus
  - (Macropus)
    - Eastern grey kangaroo
    - Western grey kangaroo
  - - (Osphranter)
      - Common wallaroo
      - Red kangaroo
    - - Wallabia
        Swamp wallaby
      - (Notamacropus)
        - Western brush wallaby
        - - Red-necked wallaby
          - - Agile wallaby
            - - Parma wallaby
              - Tammar wallaby

Based on Celik and collages (2019)

- Macropus
  - (Macropus)
    - Eastern grey kangaroo
    - Western grey kangaroo
  - - (Osphranter)
      - Red kangaroo
      - - Black wallaroo
        - - Common wallaroo
          - Antilopine kangaroo
    - - Wallabia
        Swamp wallaby
      - (Notamacropus)
        - - Western brush wallaby
          - †Toolache wallaby
        - - Red-necked wallaby
          - - - Tammar wallaby
              - Agile wallaby
            - - Whiptail wallaby
              - - Parma wallaby
                - Black-striped wallaby

== Characteristics and adaptations ==
One of the smallest wallaby species, the tammar wallaby features a proportionally small head with large ears, and an elongated tail, with a thick base. It has dark greyish upperparts with a paler underside and rufous-coloured sides and limbs. The tammar wallaby exhibits great sexual dimorphism, males reaching 9.1 kg (20 lb) in weight compared to 6.9 kg (15 lb) for females. Males are 59 to 68 cm (23–27 in) long while females are 52 to 63 cm (20–25 in), while both sexes stand 45 cm (18 in) tall. The tail has a length of 34 to 45 cm (13–18 in) for males and 33 to 44 cm (13–17 in) for females.

=== Locomotion ===
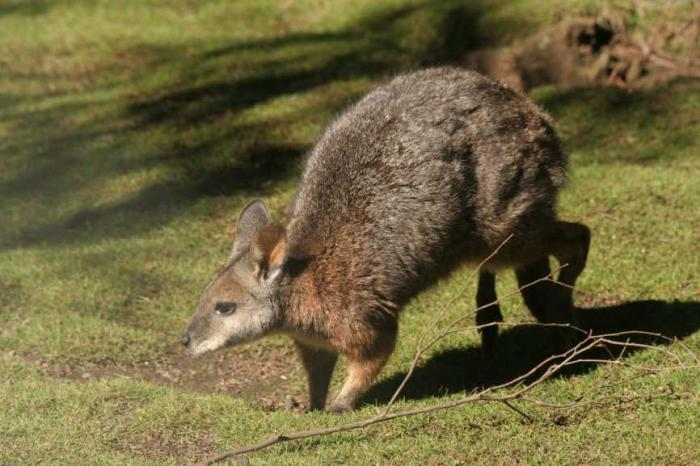
A tammar wallaby in motion

As with most macropods, the tammar wallaby moves around by hopping. This species typically leaps 0.8 to 2.4 m (2.6–7.9 ft) with 3.5 landings per second. Proximal muscles at the knee and hip joints provide the power for each leap, which shifts to the ankle muscles as the animal pushes off. As it lands, the energy of the jump is converted into strain energy made when its leg tendons are stretched. As it leaps back off the ground, the tammar wallaby can recover much of this energy for reuse through elastic recoil. When on the move, animal's respiration is tied to its hopping cycle, inhaling when leaping and exhaling when landing. As it moves faster, its heart rate increases nearly twice as much as its hopping frequency.

The amount of energy stored in the tendons increases with the animal's speed and the weight of the load it is carrying. This is particularly helpful for mothers carrying young, and explains why tammar wallabies can increase their hopping speed without using more energy. The tammar wallaby shares this characteristic with other macropods that move on flat terrain, like the red kangaroo. By comparison, rock-wallabies, such as the yellow-footed rock-wallaby, have traded efficient energy-saving for greater tendon strength: an adaption for rocky cliffs which allows them to leap higher and lowers the risk of their tendons breaking.

=== Senses ===
The tammar wallaby can see at 324° peripheral vision and 50° binocular vision, which gives them a wide field view but still being about to see their hands in front of them. It can discern light gradients better than most other small mammals, such as rabbits. Its vision is, nevertheless, not as good as that of a cat or human. Tammar wallabies appear to have some colour vision: its eyes have only blue sensitive and green sensitive photoreceptor cones, allowing it to see colour in the blue-green band of the colour spectrum, but not the longer wavelengths of the red-yellow band. Nevertheless, in the band where it can see colour, it can differentiate between two monochromatic colours with wavelengths as close as 20 nm (2.0×10^{−8} m) apart.

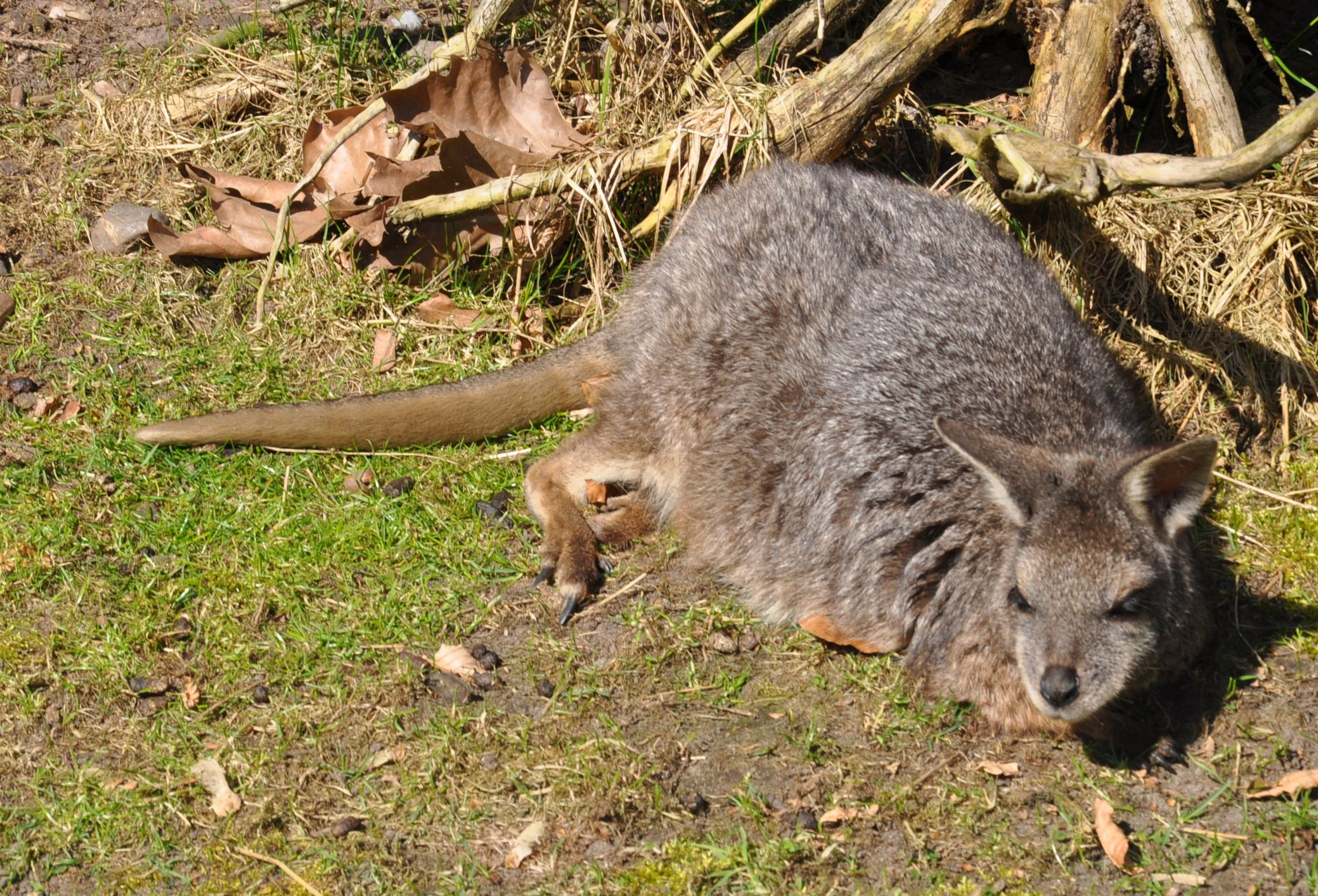
A tammar wallaby resting

The pinna (ear) of the tammar wallaby is mobile, allowing it to track sounds from different parts of its surroundings without moving its head. A tammar wallaby can point its pinna at a sound source and increase its eardrum's sound pressure by 25–30 dB at 5 kHz. When the pinna moves away from the sound source, the animal's hearing level quickly drops. When born, a tammar wallaby's sense of smell is already developed; this allows the newborn to find its mother's pouch by scent.

=== Thermoregulation and water balance ===
Tammar wallabies lick their forearms and pant to keep cool in hot weather. They breathe more heavily and lose more water when the temperature is over 30 °C (86 °F). Tammar wallabies cannot survive in temperatures above 40 °C (104 °F) and must find cooler surroundings. To prevent dehydration, tammar wallabies urinate less and suck up water from the distal colon, which gives them relatively dry feces. Being able to concentrate more urine in their kidneys allows them to survive on seawater.

== Ecology and life history ==
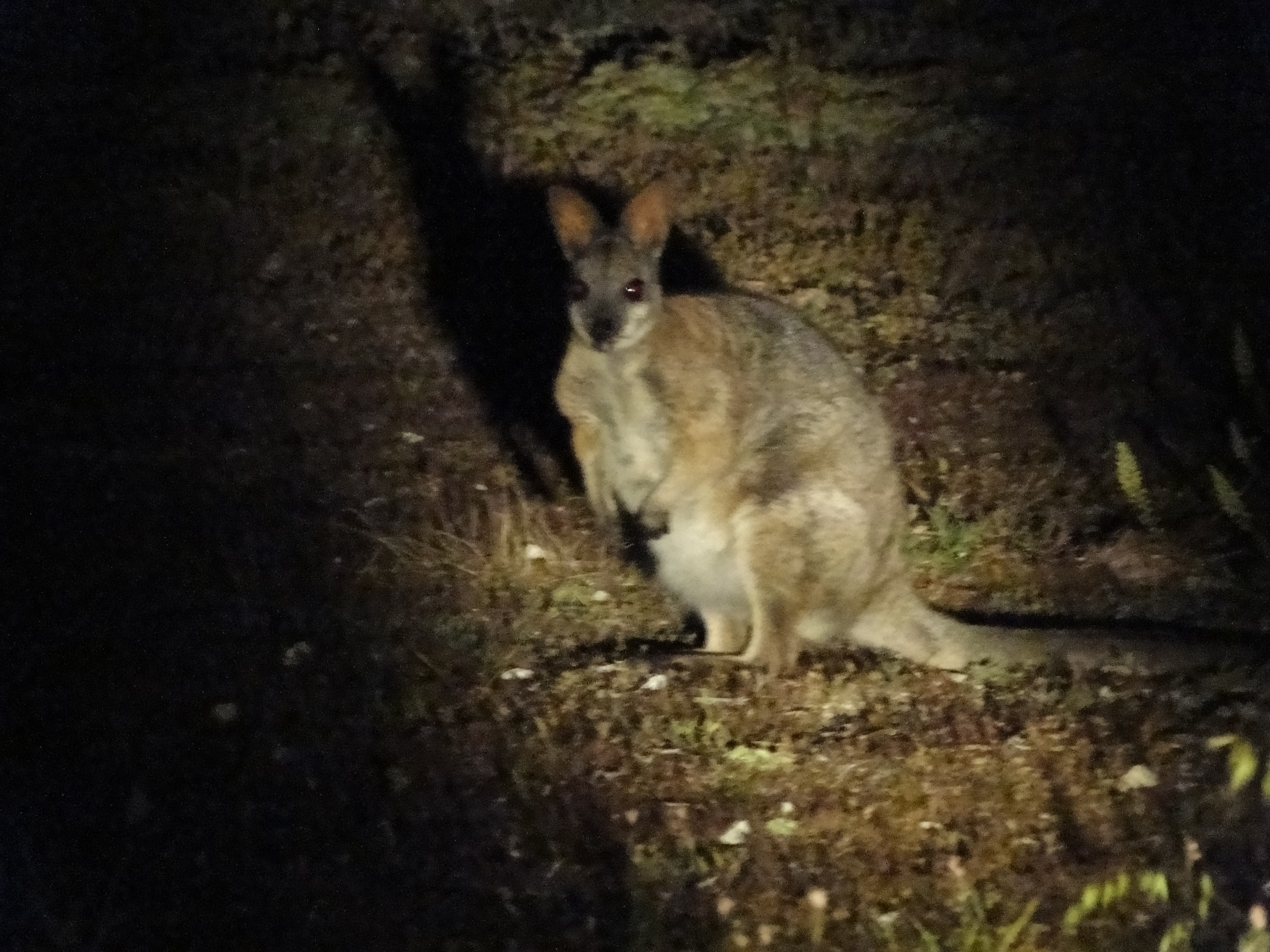
The tammar wallaby is mostly nocturnal.

During the day, tammar wallabies stay close to scrub for shade and move out to more open grassland by nightfall.In winter their home ranges are about 16 ha (40 acres), but in the dry summers they range further afield to search for quality food, needing about 42 ha (100 acres) of space. Tammar wallaby home ranges overlap with those of conspecifics. Like all macropods, the tammar wallaby is herbivorous. They are known to both graze and browse, but the latter is less effective, as they commonly drop leaves when chewing on them. When eating large leaves, tammar wallabies handle them with their fingers. Tammar wallabies consume several plant species such as heart-leaved poison (Gastrolobium bilobum), small-flowered wallaby grass (Austrodanthonia setacea), and marri (Corymbia calophylla). They survive on several islands that have no fresh water, subsisting on seawater.

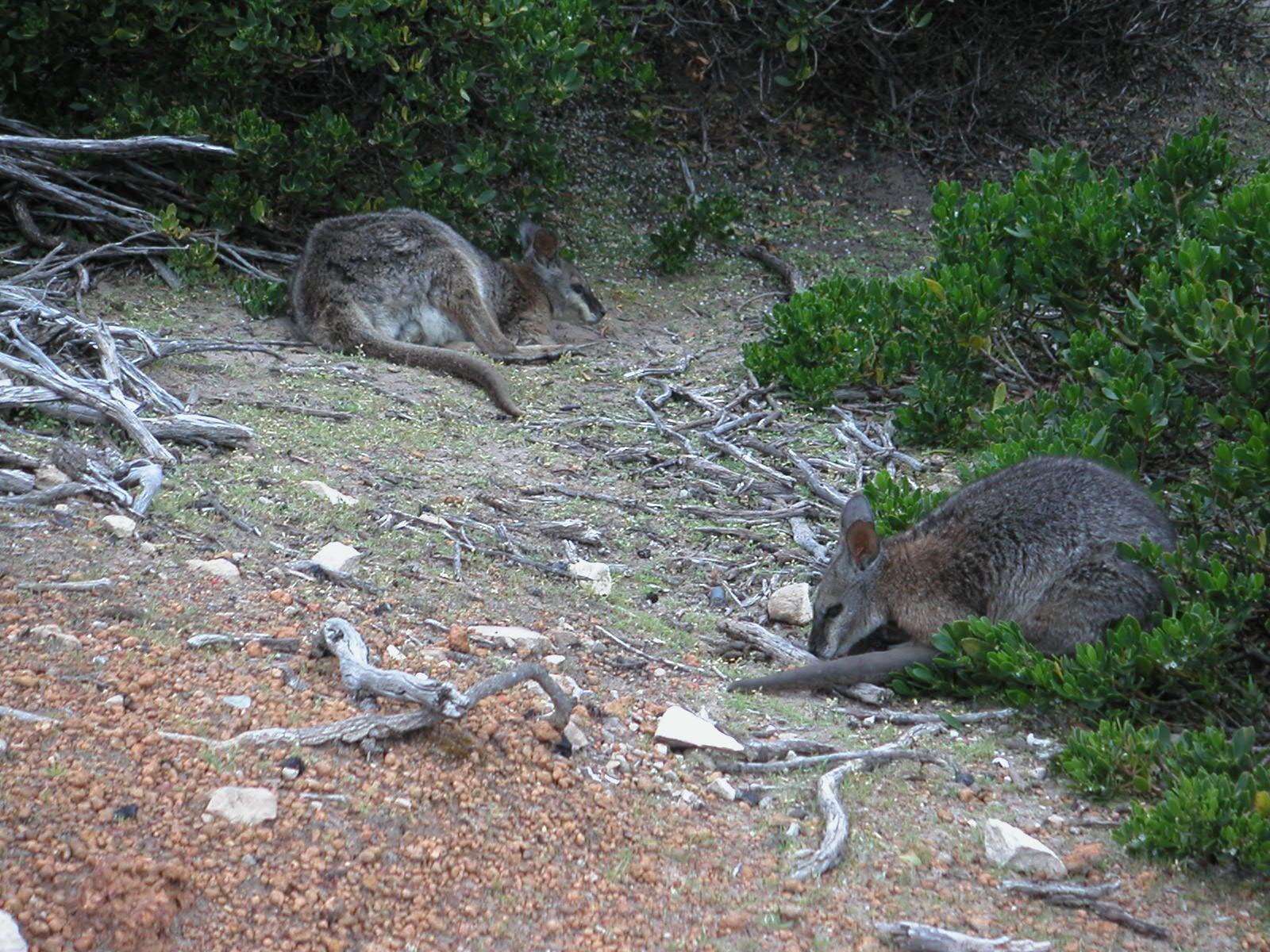
Tammar wallabies are a social species.

Tammar wallabies gather into groups which lessens the chance of an individual being taken by a predator. As the group increases in size, tammar wallabies spend more time feeding, grooming, and interacting and less time being vigilant and moving around. They are also more likely to rest on their sides rather than in a more alert posture where their head is held up. Predators of the tammar wallaby include dingoes, feral cats, red foxes and wedge-tailed eagles. They may also have been preyed upon by the extinct thylacine. Tammar wallabies appear to respond more to the sight than the sound of predators. They can also use their acute sense of smell to detect a potential threat. When a predator is detected, a tammar wallaby will alert others by thumping its foot. When lost, young tammar wallabies are known to emit a distress call and adult females may respond with a similar call.

=== Breeding and development ===
The tammar wallaby has a polygynandrous mating system, were both males and females mate with multiple partners. It is a seasonal breeder and with many births taking place between late January and early February. During the breeding season, the male's prostate and bulbourethral gland enlarge while the weight of the testes remain the same. Around two weeks prior to the first births, the males start checking the reproductive status of the females by sniffing their urogenital openings and pouches. After giving birth, females enter estrus and allow males to mate with them. However, a male that attempts to mate with an estrous female may risk attacks from other males. A male can achieve reproductive success by mate-guarding. During the estrous period, males establish a dominance hierarchy, and the higher ranking males will try to prevent subordinates from mating with estrous females. Several males may pursue a single female.

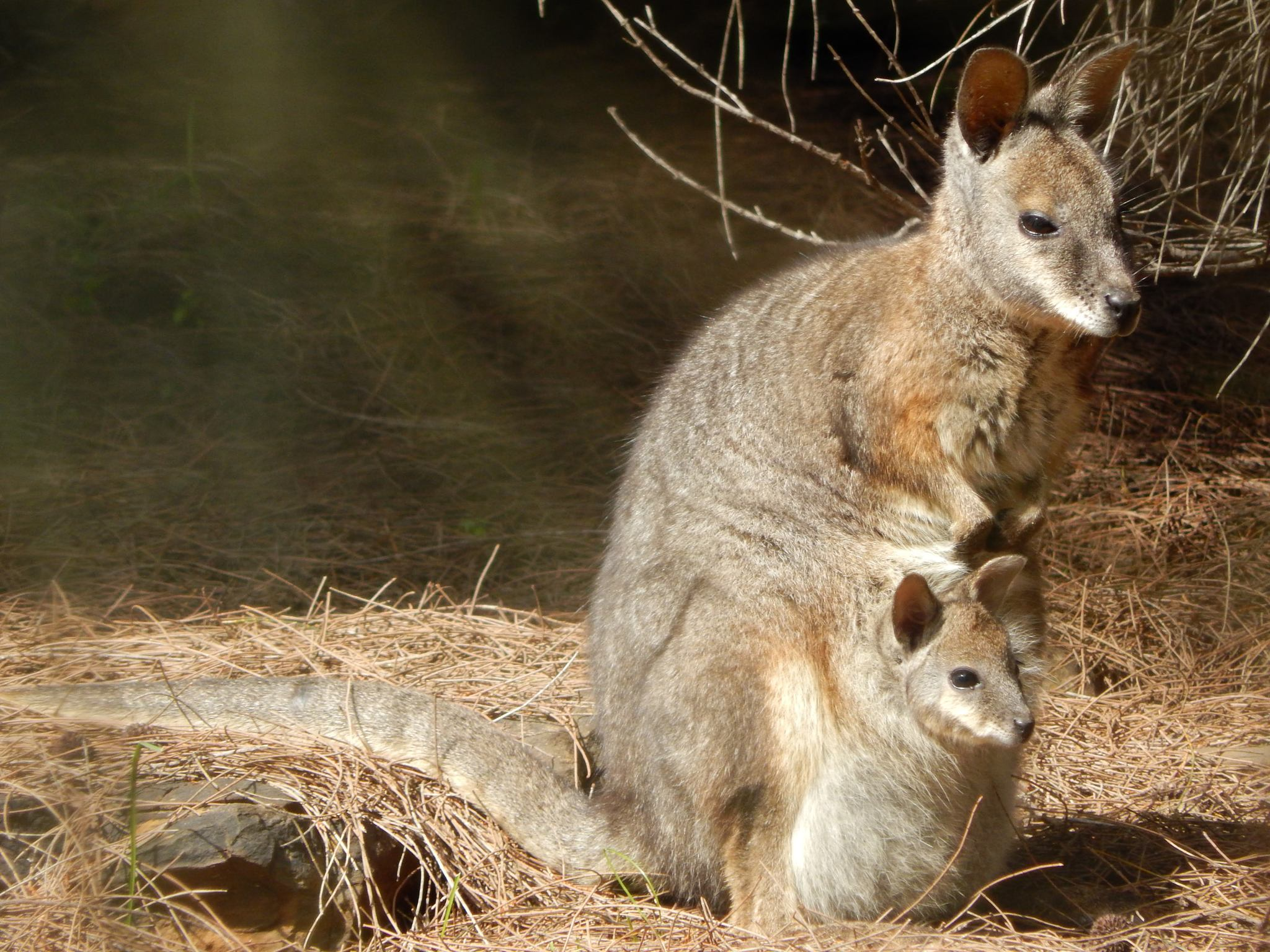
Tammar mother with joey

The female tammar wallaby is receptive shortly after giving birth. Tammar wallabies undergo embryonic diapause and the blastocyst remains dormant for nearly a year. A joey in the pouch prevents the blastocyst from developing for the first six months and experiments have shown that removing the joey within this time period will stimulate the blastocyst's development. However, after this, the blastocyst remains dormant even after the joey has left. It begins to develop by the summer solstice at the end of December. A 2019 study found that more males are born due to a greater amount of Y chromosome sperm in sires. To balance out the sex ratios, tammar mothers are more likely to abandon male joeys and more females survive to weaning periods.

The lactation period of the tammar is divided into phases 2A, 2B, and 3 (pregnancy is labeled phase 1). Phase 2A encompasses the first 100–120 days after birth, and the underdeveloped young is fed diluted milk which is richer in carbohydrates than proteins and lipids. This allows for the rapid growth of important organs and internal systems including the respiratory system, lymphoid system, and nervous system. During this phase, the young remains latched on to a teat. Phase 2B lasts for another 100 days; the young suckles intermittently but still does not leave the pouch. The composition of the milk is similar, though the proteins are different. During phase 3, the joey can leave the pouch and eat plant material. The joey will continue to suckle, the teat having enlarged and the milk having become richer in proteins and lipids over carbohydrates to give the joey more energy. During this time, the joey also experiences rapid development and transitions from ectothermy to endothermy. The joey no longer needs the pouch by 250 days and is fully weaned at 300–350 days. The tammar wallaby has been observed to engage in alloparental care, in which an adult may adopt another's young. Female tammar wallabies may mature at nine months and live to age fourteen, while males mature around two years and live for eleven years.

Unusually for mammals, analysis of the species' growth and development shows the P^{3} of the Tammar wallaby is derived from the primary dental lamina and not from the successional dental lamina.

=== Health ===
In one population of tammar wallabies, the tick species Ixodes hirsti was found to infest them during autumn and winter while those of the genus Amblyomma were more common in spring and summer. In late 1998 and again in early 1999, 120–230 tammar died suddenly in research facilities and zoos in New South Wales and Queensland, perishing less than 12 hours after their sickness was discovered, with most showing no symptoms prior. Necropsies revealed haemorrhaging of the muscles, and numerous internal organs. The syndrome is known as tammar sudden death syndrome and the pathogen is an orbivirus of the family Reoviridae. It does not occur south of Sydney, and treatment is difficult due to the rapid progression of the disease.

== Population dynamics and conservation ==
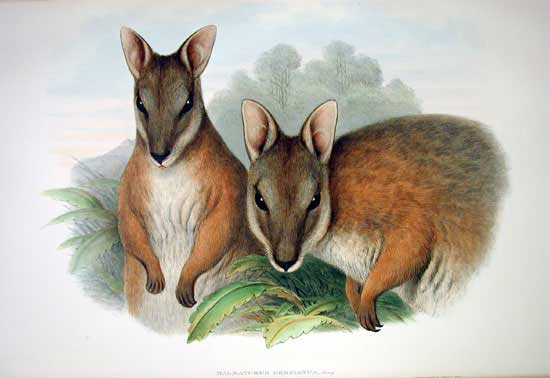
A drawing of two tammar wallabies by John Gould (1863)

The tammar wallaby is listed as Least Concern by the IUCN as of 2016, being particularly numerous on Kangaroo Island and four Western Australian islands. It has a maximum population of 50,000 mature individuals in total. However, the fragmentation of its range has led to high amounts of inbreeding and physical deformities in some populations.

Since European colonisation, tammar wallabies on both mainland Australia and some of the islands have greatly declined or even been eradicated. In the early 20th century, the mainland population in Western Australia was described as numerous throughout the southwest, but declining in agricultural areas to the north. Clearings made for wheat and sheep caused the population to fall even further. Starting in the 19th century, tammar wallabies in the Eyre Peninsula and around Adelaide were decimated by mobs of hunters protecting agriculture. As a result, they were extirpated from both these areas in the 20th century. Tammars from Flinders Island and St Peter Island were eradicated in a similar manner.

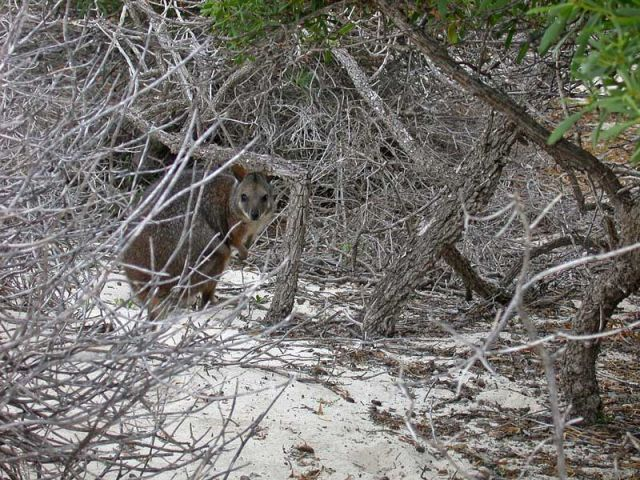
A tammar wallaby on North Island in the Houtman Abrolhos

Tammar wallabies from these areas were introduced to Kawau Island in New Zealand by Sir George Grey in 1870. They were introduced to the Rotorua area in the early 20th century. Since then, they have flourished to the point where their foraging has damaged local plants. Pest control operators have used sodium fluoroacetate to control their populations, a practice which has been controversial because of its possible effect on organisms not targeted by the poison, including humans. Cyanide pellets have been used as an alternative.

In 1985, tammar wallabies were introduced to the North Island of the Houtman Abrolhos and have made similar impacts on native vegetation. Their numbers grew to over 450 individuals, but by 2008 culling efforts appeared to have reduced their numbers to 25 individuals. In 2003, the Monarto Zoo temporarily kept 85 tammar wallabies from New Zealand awaiting reintroduction to the Innes National Park on the Yorke Peninsula in South Australia. Four releases have been made, and the population increased to 100–120 animals by 2012. Tammar wallaby were reintroduced to Kalbarri National Park in 2010 though the project was not considered successful as the majority of radio-collared individuals did not last more than a year.

=== Resistance to sodium fluoroacetate ===
Different tammar wallaby populations have varying levels of resistance to sodium fluoroacetate. Mainland Western Australian tammar wallabies appear to be the most resistant, while those on Kangaroo Island are much more vulnerable. Tammar wallabies from New Zealand are also vulnerable, as poison has been successfully used to control their populations. Tammar wallabies from East and West Wallabi Islands and Garden Island, which do not have plants containing sodium fluoroacetate, are less resistant than mainland Western Australian tammar wallabies, but are more resistant than those from Kangaroo Island. This suggests that tammar wallabies originated in South Australia and developed a resistance to sodium fluoroacetate when they reached Western Australia, where the poison is found in plants.

== Use in science ==
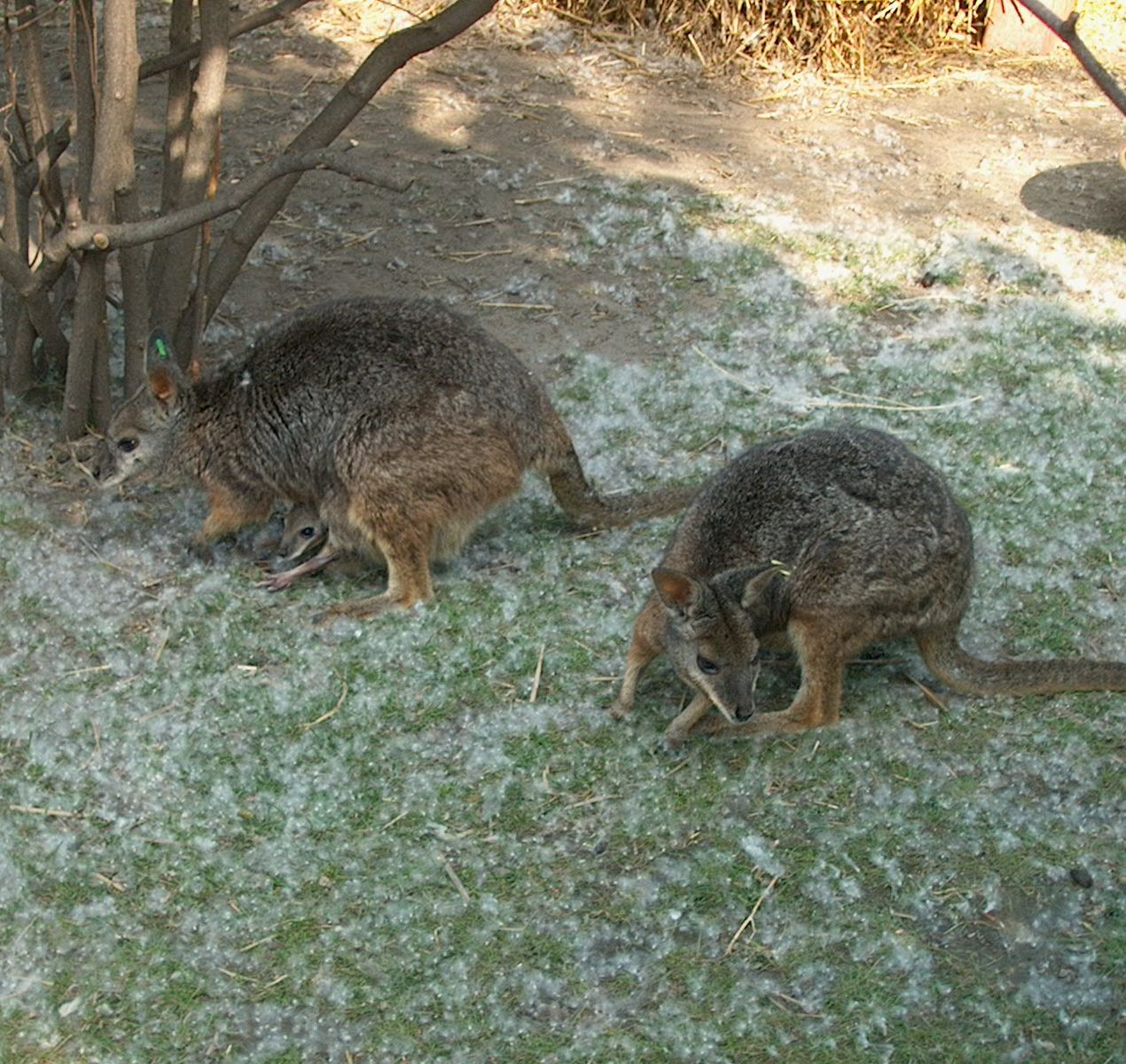
Tammar wallabies are easy to keep in captivity.

The tammar wallaby is a model organism for studying marsupial biology, as well as mammal biology in general. It has been used in the fields of reproductive biology, immunology, metabolism, neurobiology and many others. Its "seasonal and lactational control of its reproduction" makes its reproduction particularly suited for study. Saunders and colleagues (2017) have suggested the bipedal tammar as a better model for research into human spinal cord injuries than quadrupedal rodents. Tammar wallabies are easy to keep in captivity as they are non-aggressive, can adjust to surgeries and reproduce easily, requiring just one male for five females. Tammar wallabies used for scientific study are generally housed in outdoor pens with enough water and shelter, instead of a laboratory.

The genomes of marsupials are of great interest to scientists studying comparative genomics, and the study of tammar wallabies has provided much information about the genetics of marsupials and mammals in general. Marsupials are at a convenient degree of evolutionary divergence from humans; mice are too close and have not developed many different functions, while birds are genetically too remote. Key immune genes from the tammar wallaby were highlighted and studied in 2009.

In 2011, the tammar would become the second marsupial to have its full genome sequenced after the grey short-tailed opossum. The researchers found "innovation in reproductive and lactational genes, rapid evolution of germ cell genes, and incomplete, locus-specific X inactivation". The researchers also found new HOX genes that control gene expression, as well as new microRNAs. Genes for producing milk were shown to be novel while gonad genes appeared to be more conserved. Prior to the full genome sequencing of marsupials, the identification and characterization of important immunological components were limited in most marsupial species. The current sequencing and annotation of whole marsupial genomes have been useful for the further understanding of marsupial immune systems by simplifying the characterization of immune molecules in marsupials, and has aided in biomedical research. A 2017 molecular study of the tammar and the mink found the potential involvement of EGF, FOXO, CDKN1A in controlling mammalian embryonic diapause. IL-10 and IL-10Δ3 are conserved in the tammar showing their immune system can respond to pathogens similarly to other eutherian mammals using these same immune components.

A compound in the milk of the tammar wallaby called AGG01 has the potential to be a new and effective antibiotic. AGG01 is a protein, and in laboratory tests has proven to be far more powerful than penicillin. It kills many types pathogenic bacteria (both Gram-positive and Gram-negative) and at least one fungus. Subsequent analysis of the genome has led to the finding of several cathelicidin peptides, which could also be used as antibiotics. The foregut of the tammar wallaby contains species of bacteria belonging to the phyla Bacillota, Bacteroidota and Pseudomonadota. New species have been discovered: WG–1 of Pseudomonadota and TWA4 of Bacillota. These bacteria produce less methane than others and do not require CO_{2} to survive. This has important environmental implications, as this information could be used to reduce carbon production in livestock.
