= Scrub wallaby =

Scrub wallaby often refers to the Black-striped wallaby (Macropus dorsalis).

Scrub wallaby may also loosely refer to one of these other marsupials that often live in scrubland or brushland:

== Wallabies (genera Macropus and Notamacropus) ==
- Red-necked wallaby or Bennett's wallaby (Macropus rufogriseus)
- Tammar wallaby (Notamacropus eugenii)
- Western brush wallaby, also "western scrub wallaby" or "black-gloved wallaby" (Macropus irma)

== Pademelons (genus Thylogale) ==
- Any pademelon, including:
  - Tasmanian pademelon (Thylogale billardierii)
