= Macropus pearsoni =

Macropus pearsoni Temporal range: Pliocene–Pleistocene

Scientific classification
- Kingdom: Animalia
- Phylum: Chordata
- Class: Mammalia
- Infraclass: Marsupialia
- Order: Diprotodontia
- Family: Macropodidae
- Genus: Macropus
- Species: †M. pearsoni

Binomial name
- †Macropus pearsoni (Bartholomai, 1971)

Synonyms
- Fissuridon pearsoni Bartholomai, 1971

Extinct species of marsupial

Macropus pearsoni is an extinct Australian vertebrate species belonging to the family Macropodidae, and is in the same genus (Macropus) as extant kangaroos. M. pearsoni lived during the Pleistocene. It is known from fossil mandibles collected from Pleistocene beds from the Darling Downs in New South Wales, Lake Kanunka in northeastern South Australia, and the Cape York Peninsula. it reached a size similar to Macropus titan, which is a mass of 150 kg.
