= Macropus ferragus =

Macropus ferragus Temporal range: Late Pleistocene

Scientific classification
- Kingdom: Animalia
- Phylum: Chordata
- Class: Mammalia
- Infraclass: Marsupialia
- Order: Diprotodontia
- Family: Macropodidae
- Genus: Macropus
- Species: †M. ferragus

Binomial name
- †Macropus ferragus Owen 1874

Extinct species of marsupial

Macropus ferragus is an extinct species of kangaroo that lived in Australia during the Late Pleistocene.

== Description ==
Macropus ferragus was a large species of kangaroo. It has been estimated to stand up to 2.5 m (8.2 ft) and weigh around 150 kg (330 lb).

Fossils have mostly been found in the state of New South Wales. It lived until around 30,000 years ago. Fossils found at Lake Menindee in New South Wales potentially date to as recently as 18,000 BP.
