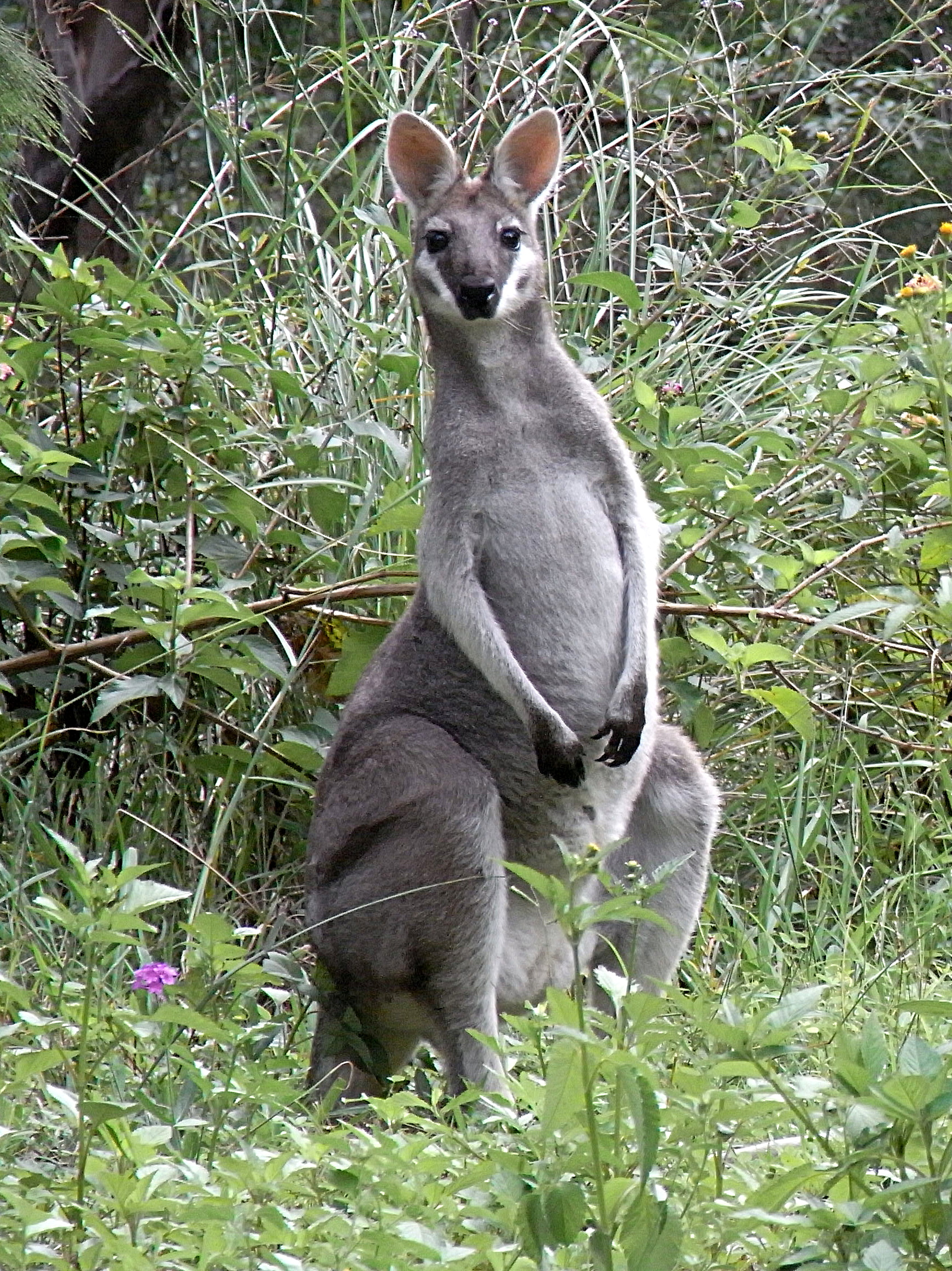
- Whiptail wallaby (Notamacropus parryi)

Scientific classification
- Kingdom: Animalia
- Phylum: Chordata
- Class: Mammalia
- Infraclass: Marsupialia
- Order: Diprotodontia
- Family: Macropodidae
- Subfamily: Macropodinae
- Genus: Notamacropus; Dawson & Flannery, 1985

Type species
- Halmaturus agilis Gould, 1841
- Notamacropus distribution

= Notamacropus =

Genus of marsupials

Notamacropus is a genus of small marsupials in the family Macropodidae, commonly known as wallabies (among other species). The term is derived from the Latin nota "stripe" and macropus "kangaroo", referencing the distinct facial stripe of many extant genus members and their phylogenetic relationship to other kangaroos.

In 2019, a reassessment of macropod taxonomy determined that Notamacropus and Osphranter, formerly considered subgenera of Macropus, should be moved to the genus level. This change was accepted by the Australian Faunal Directory in 2020.

== Species ==
Image	Scientific name	Distribution
	Agile wallaby (Notamacropus agilis)	
	Black-striped wallaby (Notamacropus dorsalis)	
	Parma wallaby (Notamacropus parma)	
	Red-necked wallaby (Notamacropus rufogriseus)	
	Tammar wallaby (Notamacropus eugenii)	
	Western brush wallaby (Notamacropus irma)	
	Whiptail wallaby (Notamacropus parryi)	
	†Toolache wallaby (Notamacropus greyi)	
