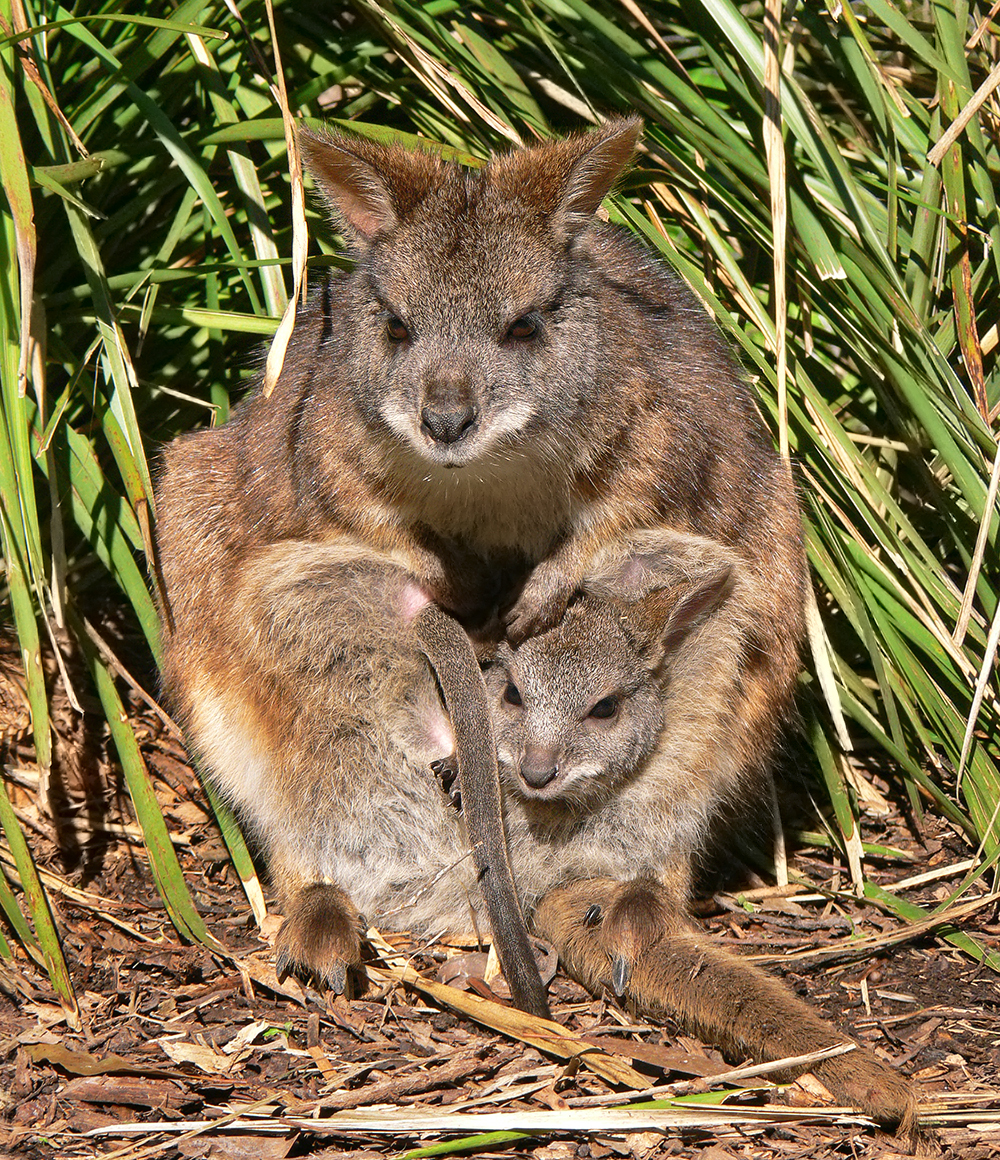

Conservation status
- Vulnerable (IUCN 3.1)

Scientific classification
- Kingdom: Animalia
- Phylum: Chordata
- Class: Mammalia
- Infraclass: Marsupialia
- Order: Diprotodontia
- Family: Macropodidae
- Genus: Notamacropus
- Species: N. parma

Binomial name
- Notamacropus parma (Waterhouse, 1845)
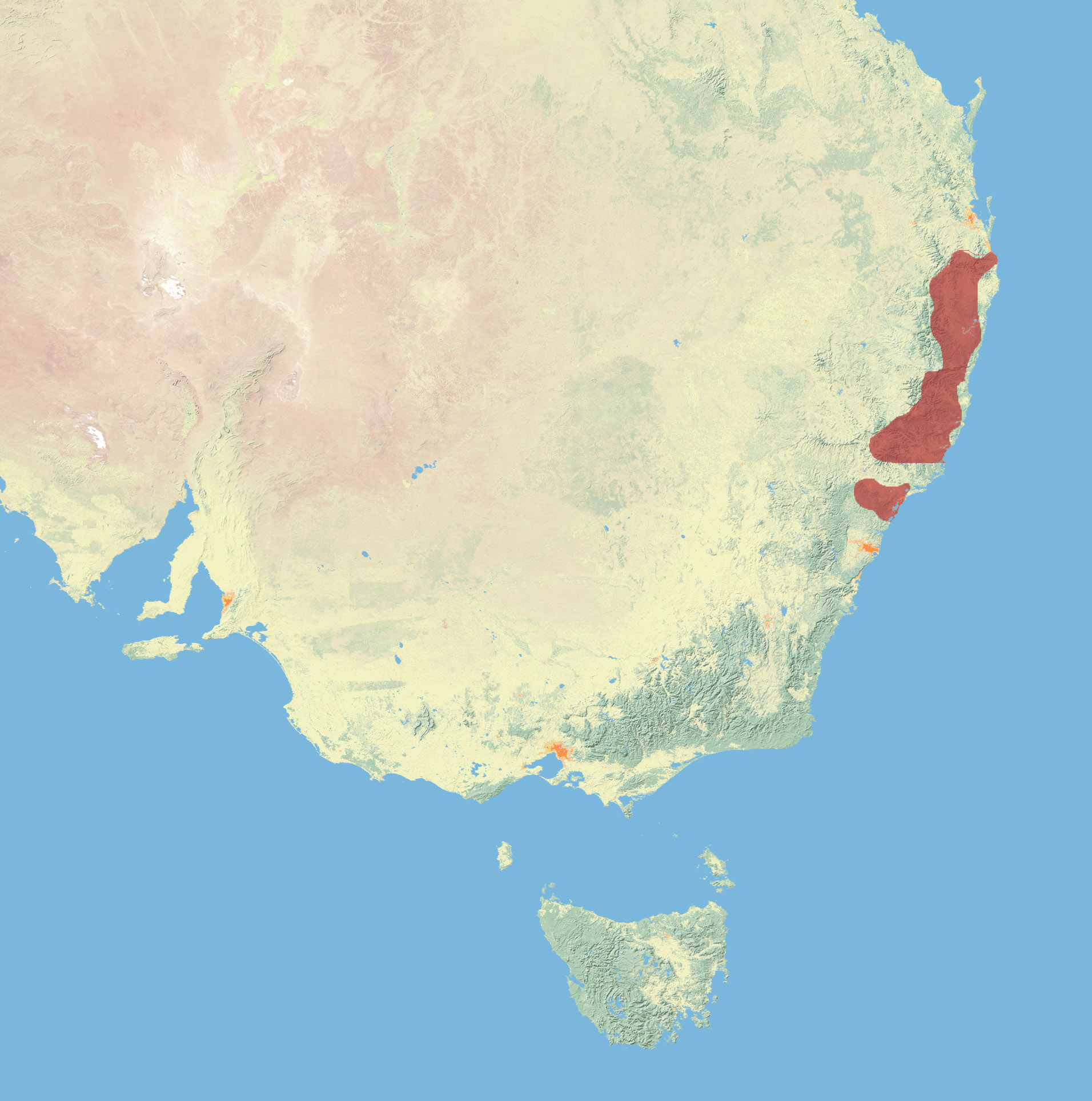
- Parma wallaby range

Synonyms
- Macropus parma Waterhouse, 1845

= Parma wallaby =

Species of marsupial

The parma wallaby (Notamacropus parma) is a small marsupial macropod mammal native to forests and densely-vegetated areas of northeastern New South Wales, Australia, close to the border with Queensland. An introduced population exists on New Zealand's Kawau Island. About the size of a stout cat, it lives mainly under thick plant cover, and is only active at night when it emerges to feed on grasses and small plants. It is the smallest of the wallabies (short, kangaroo-like marsupial mammals of the genus Notamacropus) and carries its young in a pouch, as with other marsupials. Shy and elusive, it was believed extinct until its rediscovery in the 1960s.

Parma wallabies are threatened by habitat loss, and, in addition to native predators (such as birds of prey, monitor lizards, and snakes), they are easily preyed upon by dingoes and non-native feral cats and red foxes.

== Taxonomy ==
The parma wallaby was first described by British naturalist John Gould in about 1840. Its epithet parma (Waterhouse 1845) comes after a word from a New South Wales Aboriginal language, but the exact source word and language have not been identified.

In 2019, a reassessment of macropod taxonomy determined that Osphranter and Notamacropus, formerly considered subgenera of Macropus, should be moved to the genus level. This change was accepted by the Australian Faunal Directory in 2020.

== Description ==
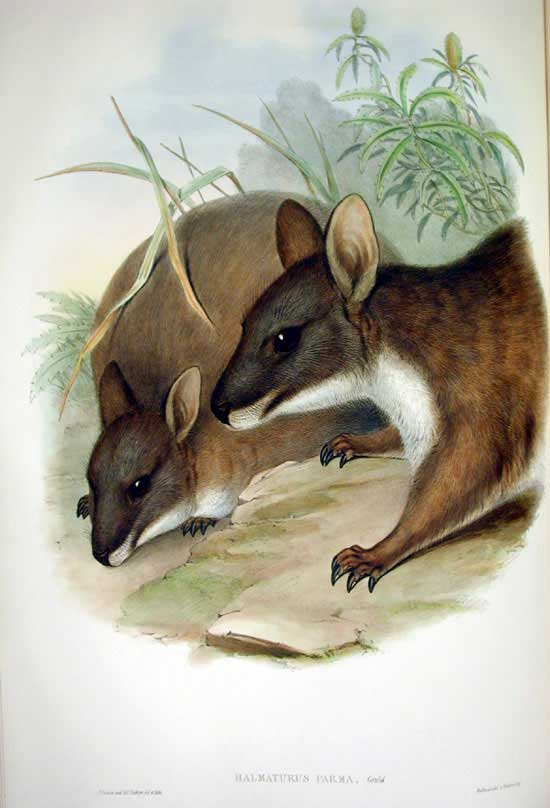

The parma wallaby is the smallest member of the genus Notamacropus, at between 3.2 and 5.8 kg (7.1 and 12.8 lb), less than one-tenth the size of the red kangaroo. It is about 0.5 m (1.6 ft) in length, with a sparsely furred, blackish tail about the same length again. The fur is a reddish or greyish brown above, greyer about the head, and fading to pale grey underneath. Presumably, individuals had been sighted many times during the years when it was "extinct", but mistaken for an especially slender and long-tailed example of the otherwise similar red-legged and red-necked pademelons.

== Presumed extinction and rediscovery ==
A shy cryptic creature of the wet sclerophyll forests of northern New South Wales (Australia), it was never commonly-encountered and, even before the end of the 19th century, it was believed to be extinct.

In 1965, workers on Kawau Island, New Zealand (near Auckland), trying to control a plague of introduced tammar wallabies (a widespread and fairly common species in Australia), were astonished to discover that some of the animals were not truly tammar wallabies, but a miraculously surviving population of parma wallabies - a species long-thought extinct. The extermination effort was put on-hold while individuals were captured and sent to institutions in Australia and around the world in the hope that they would breed in captivity and could eventually be reintroduced to their native habitat.

The renewed interest in the parma wallaby soon led to another milestone: in 1967 it was found that they still existed in the forests near Gosford, New South Wales. Further investigation showed that the parma wallaby was alive and well, and although not common, was to be found in forests along the Great Dividing Range from near Gosford almost as far north as the Queensland border.

The offspring of the Kawau Island population are smaller than their fully-wild, Australian relatives, even when provided with ample food; it appears that competition, for limited food resources on the island, selects for smaller individuals, an incipient example of the evolutionary phenomenon of insular dwarfism.

== Habitat and behaviour ==
The Parma wallaby inhabits wet sclerophyll (hard-leaved) forests of northern New South Wales, Australia. Like the pademelon, it prefers forest with thick undergrowth, and grassy patches, although parma wallabies are also found occasionally in dry eucalypt forest and even rainforest. It is mainly nocturnal and usually shelters in thick scrub during the day, through which it can travel at speed along the runways it makes. It emerges from cover shortly before dusk to feed on grasses and herbs in forest clearings. The parma wallaby is largely solitary, with two or at most three animals sometimes coming together to feed in favourable circumstances.

== Conservation status ==
The species remains rarely seen, with some evidence for a recent population decline. It is classified as Near Threatened according to the 2015 IUCN assessment.
