= Macropus mundjabus =

Macropus mundjabus Temporal range: Pleistocene

Scientific classification
- Kingdom: Animalia
- Phylum: Chordata
- Class: Mammalia
- Infraclass: Marsupialia
- Order: Diprotodontia
- Family: Macropodidae
- Genus: Macropus
- Species: †M. mundjabus

Binomial name
- †Macropus mundjabus (Flannery, 1980)

Extinct species of marsupial

Macropus mundjabus is an extinct species of kangaroo found from a single location near Morwell, Victoria. It was first described by Tim Flannery in 1980, using the particular form of the foot bones to suggest that it may have inhabited rocky areas due to similarities with the bone forms of contemporary rock-wallabies. Flannery records the species name mundjabus as being derived from 'mundjab', which means 'he has gone' in the local indigenous language. The specific tribal group is not named by Flannery; however, it is likely to be from Gunai.
