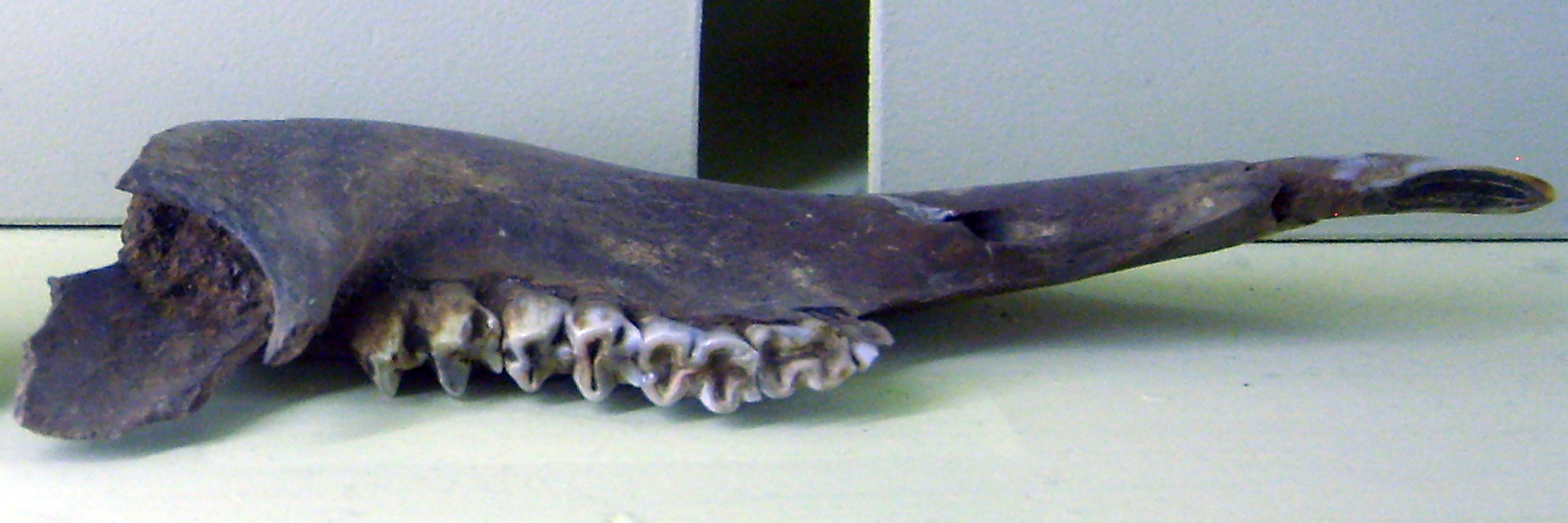
- Jaw, Naturkunde Museum, Berlin

Scientific classification
- Kingdom: Animalia
- Phylum: Chordata
- Class: Mammalia
- Infraclass: Marsupialia
- Order: Diprotodontia
- Family: Macropodidae
- Genus: Macropus
- Species: †M. titan

Binomial name
- †Macropus titan Owen 1838

= Macropus titan =

Macropus titan Temporal range: Pleistocene

Extinct species of marsupial

Macropus titan is an extinct species of kangaroo belonging to the genus Macropus that lived in Australia during the Pleistocene. It is one of the largest known kangaroo species, with an estimated body mass of around 150 kilograms (330 lb), exceeding living kangaroos in size. Some authors have argued that the species should be considered a paleosubspecies of the eastern grey kangaroo (Macropus giganteus) as Macropus giganteus titan.

== Palaeoecology ==
The dental mesowear of this macropodid is indicative of it being a mixed feeder.
