= Macropus pan =

Scientific classification
- Kingdom: Animalia
- Phylum: Chordata
- Class: Mammalia
- Infraclass: Marsupialia
- Order: Diprotodontia
- Family: Macropodidae
- Genus: Macropus
- Species: †M. pan

Binomial name
- †Macropus pan de Vis, 1895

Species of marsupial

Macropus pan is an extinct species of marsupial that existed during the Pliocene in Australia, known only from fossils located at several sites across Australia. The species is recognised as allied to the modern grey kangaroos, the western Macropus fuliginosus and eastern Macropus giganteus, in a clade initially named as subgenus Macropus (Macropus) Dawson & Flannery.

== Discovery ==
The first description was provided by Charles W. De Vis in 1895, emerging from the author's examination of fossil material held at the Queensland Museum. Fossil specimens of Quanbun local fauna, named for a site in Western Australia, were also identified as this species. The origin of the type specimen was not recorded, although based on comparisons to material with a known provenance it is assumed to have excavated at Chinchilla, Queensland.

== Description ==
A larger macropod than any modern species, the standing height was estimated to be over two metres.

== Palaeobiology ==
=== Palaeopathology ===
A fossil of M. pan from the Chinchilla Sand in southeastern Queensland showing pathological signs of Macropod Progressive Periodontal Disease (MPPD), known colloquially as lumpy jaw.
