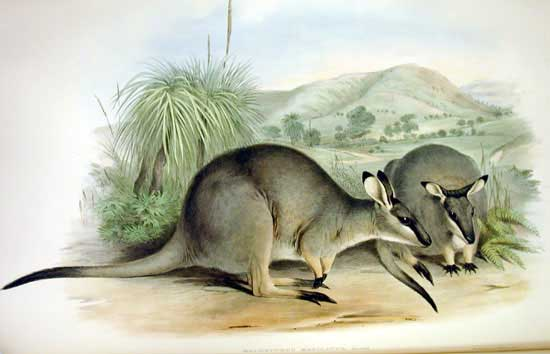

Conservation status
- Least Concern (IUCN 3.1)

Scientific classification
- Kingdom: Animalia
- Phylum: Chordata
- Class: Mammalia
- Infraclass: Marsupialia
- Order: Diprotodontia
- Family: Macropodidae
- Genus: Notamacropus
- Species: N. irma

Binomial name
- Notamacropus irma (Jourdan, 1837)
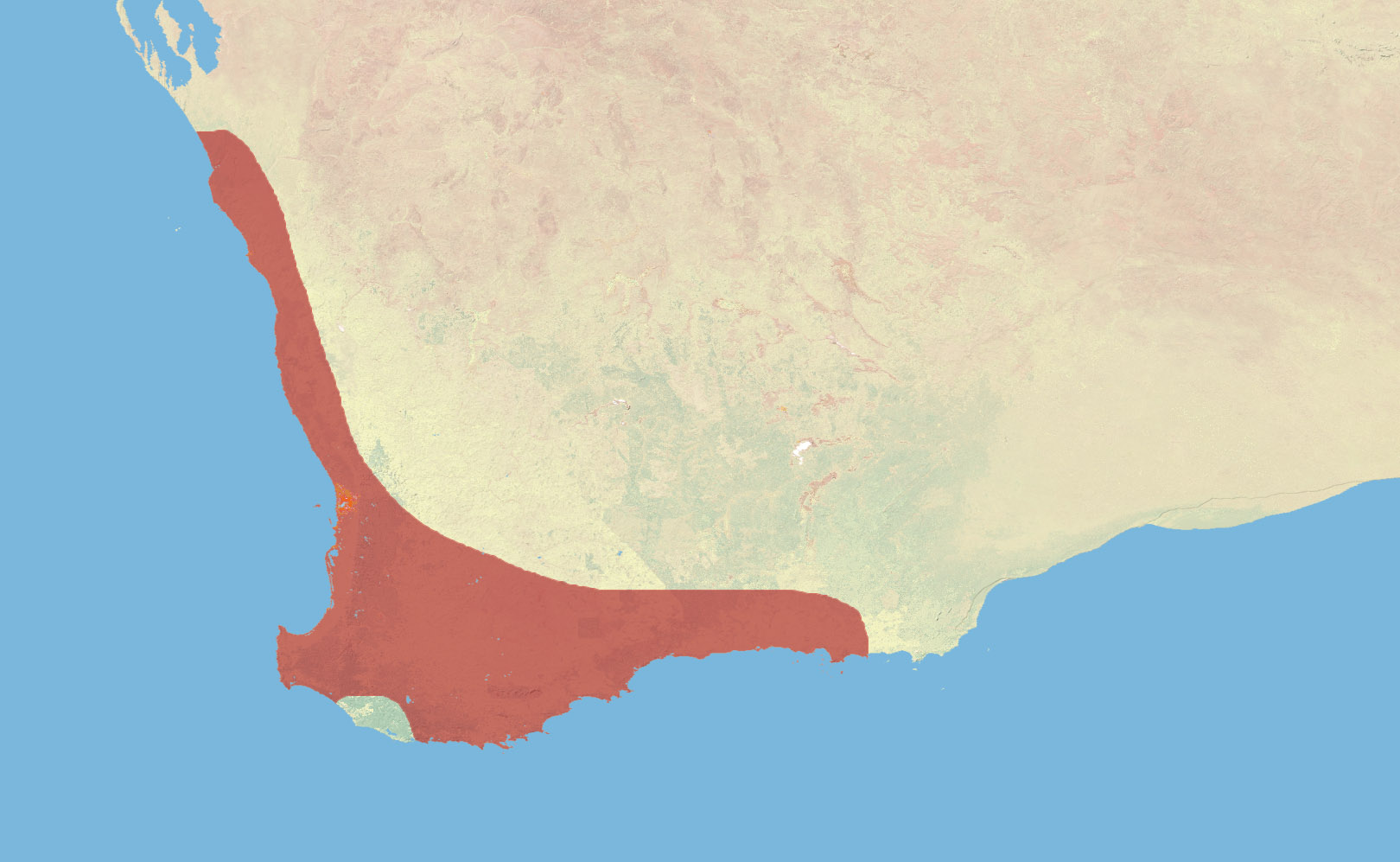
- Western brush wallaby range

Synonyms
- Halmaturus irma Jourdan, 1837; Macropus irma (Jourdan, 1837)

= Western brush wallaby =

Species of marsupial

The western brush wallaby (Notamacropus irma), also known as the black-gloved wallaby, is a species of wallaby found in the southwestern coastal region of Western Australia. The wallaby's main threat is predation by the introduced red fox (Vulpes vulpes). The IUCN lists the western brush wallaby as Least Concern, as it remains fairly widespread and the population is believed to be stable or increasing, as a result of red fox control programs.

The western brush wallaby has a grey colour with distinctive white colouring around the face, arms and legs (although it does have black gloves as its alternative common name implies). It is an unusually diurnal macropod that eats mainly grass.

== Taxonomy ==
The western brush wallaby was first scientifically described by Claude Jourdan in 1837. It also goes by the common names of the black-gloved wallaby or the kwoora. The western brush wallaby falls under the order Diprotodontia which is composed of marsupials with only one pair of incisors in the lower jaw (although a second, non-functional pair may be present), three pairs of upper incisors, and no lower canine teeth. All of these characteristics of the teeth are clear adaptions for an herbivorous diet. The western brush wallaby is in the superfamily Macropodoidea, the suborder Macropodiformes, and the genus Notamacropus. They are part of the largest family of marsupials, Macropodidae, which are believed to have become secondarily terrestrial after descending from arboreal marsupials.

Following systematic revisions of Macropus that elevated its subgenera, the taxon is recognised by the Australian Faunal Directory as Notamacropus irma. A name published as Macropus melanopus Gould 1940 remained largely unrecognised by workers until discussed and placed in synonymy in 1989. The description of a specimen obtained at the Swan River, Macropus manicatus, Gould, 1841, is also recognised as a synonym. Genetic analysis found that its closest relative was the extinct toolache wallaby.

Names derived from the Nyungar language are kwara (pronounced kwa'ra), as it was known at the Swan River colony, and koora (koo'ra), recorded at the interior regions of Southwest Australia, that are recommended as the appropriate common names for this species.

== Description ==
A species of Notamacropus, with a head and body measurement up to 900 millimetres and tail from 600 to 950 mm; the standing height of N. irma is around 800 mm. The western brush wallaby's gunmetal grey colouring resembles the larger kangaroos of the region. Their tail length is proportionally long to their smaller body size. The adult western brush wallaby weighs anywhere from 7.0-9.0 kg. Their colouring consists of a pale to mid grey coat with a distinct white facial stripe from the ear to the mouth. Other distinct features include black and white ears, black hands and feet, and crest of black hairs on the tail. Some individuals present darkly coloured barring that is slightly visible at the back and rump. The size of the male and female are quite similar.

== Behaviour ==
Almost all of their feeding activity is during daylight, whereas most macropods are somewhat nocturnal. The posture of the species when escaping an observer is horizontal, with the tail outstretched and head held down. Little is known about the behaviour of the western brush wallaby, however much of their behavior is consistent with that of other members of the family Macropodidae.

=== Diet ===
The western brush wallaby is a herbivore, although there is disagreement on whether it is a browser, eating mainly leaves, or a grazer, eating mainly grass, as there has not been extensive research done. It is a diurnal animal, which is somewhat unusual for macropods, and is active during dawn and dusk, making it crepuscular. It rests during the hottest part of the day and at night either singly or in pairs, taking shelter in bushes and small thickets . The wallabies will consume most species of plants, with Carpobrotus edulis, Cynodon dactylon, and Nuytsia floribunda being the common dietary items. One source suggests that the wallaby's diet is made up of 3-17% of grasses and sedges, 1-7% forbs, and 79-88% browsing material (mainly the leaves of low shrubs). The stomach is divided into four compartments where microorganisms can ferment the fibrous plant material. They appear to be able to survive without free water.

=== Reproduction ===
Although decades of research have been done in regards to the reproductive behavior of the western brush wallaby, their habits are relatively unknown. The young are usually born during April and May. Females, like all marsupials, have a well-developed forwardly opening pouch containing four teats. The female gives birth to one young a time, with two rarely occurring. Gestation lasts from three to five weeks. After birth, the young enter the lactation period for seven months, until October or November. After vacating the pouch the young wallaby goes through a weaning period during which it will stick its head in the pouch temporarily attach itself to a teat.

=== Movement ===
Like all others in the family Macropodidae, the western brush wallabies are characterised by powerful hind limbs and long hind feet. It runs by weaving or sidestepping, utilising its powerful hind-limbs, while keeping its head low and its tail extended straight, making it very speedy.

The western brush wallaby resembles peramelemorphs in having syndactyl second and third toes on the hind-foot, where the two small digits are fused together except at the tip, where a pair of slender claws protrudes. Macropods are uniquely "pentapedal" meaning that at slow speeds they move by moving the weight of the body onto their forelimbs and their down-turned tail while the hind-limbs swing forward. This movement makes for a rather awkward slow gait. When moving quickly the fourth toe, which is the longest and strongest, is aligned with the axis of the foot and plays an important role in the hopping motion while the tail functions in keeping its balance. The hind-legs cannot move backwards nor can they move independently of each other (unless swimming or on its side) allowing for a more energy efficient hopping. The forelimbs of macropods are small and weakly developed.

=== Distribution and habitat ===
The western brush wallaby is found in the southwest coastal region of Western Australia from Kalbarri all the way down to Cape Arid, particularly centralised near the Swan River. They are found in some areas of mallee and heathland and are uncommon in wet sclerophyll forests. There are none in the true Karri forests because of the thick undergrowth present. They prefer tall open forests that supply good grazing. They particularly favor open, seasonally damp flat areas with low grasses and open scrubby brushes. This type of open habitat contributes to the speediness of the animal as it moves low to the ground.

== Population and conservation status ==
During the early days of settlement of Western Australia the western brush wallaby was very common. Soon after Europeans settled in Western Australia, commercial trade of wallaby skins began.

Exotic species have had a tremendous effect on Australia, as it is a very geographically isolated continent; it has experienced an unparalleled rate of extinction. In the 1970s, the population the western brush wallaby began to decline as the population of the red fox dramatically increased. The red foxes particularly targeted the juvenile wallabies as soon as they left their mother's pouch. According to a survey taken in 1970 in the Jarrah Forests of the Darling Range, there were 10 individuals per 100 square kilometres; another survey was taken in 1990 and the population had declined to 1 per 100 square kilometres. The population of the western grey kangaroo, which only differs from the western brush wallaby in its large size, was also monitored during this time; the kangaroos' population remained constant during the 20-year period.

Kinnear's pioneering work in the 1990s provided the Department of Environment and Conservation of Western Australia with an effective method of controlling the red foxes using meat and egg baits with "1080", an environmentally-friendly toxin. His method proved successful and significantly contributed to the recovery of the western brush wallaby, along with several other animal populations. Currently there are about 100,000 animals. Due to this recovery, the western brush wallaby been moved from the IUCN Near Threatened list to the Least Concern list.

Although red fox control measures have helped the population stabilise considerably, due to habitat clearing for farming the population is still fragmented and their range greatly reduced.
