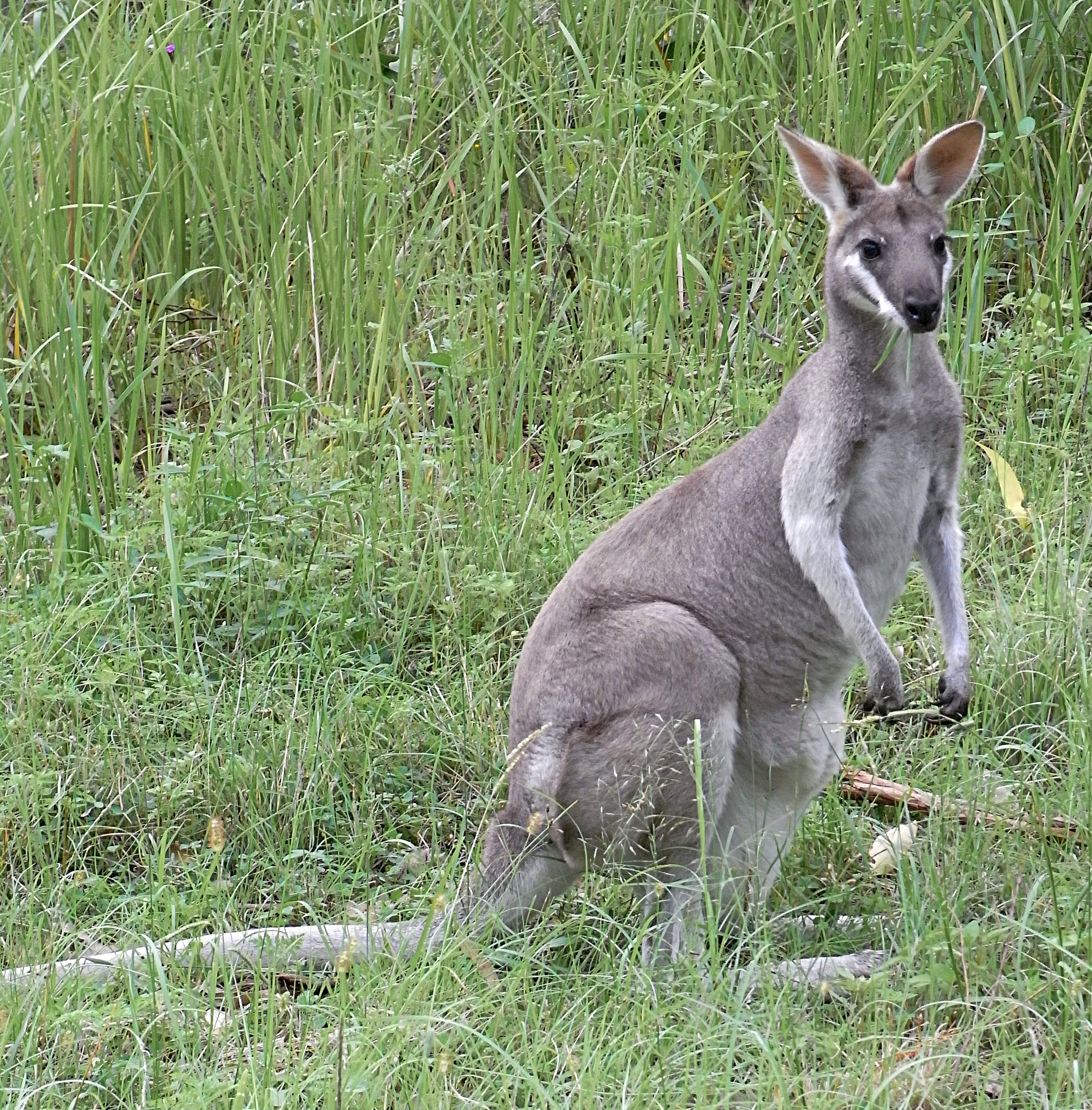

Conservation status
- Least Concern (IUCN 3.1)

Scientific classification
- Kingdom: Animalia
- Phylum: Chordata
- Class: Mammalia
- Infraclass: Marsupialia
- Order: Diprotodontia
- Family: Macropodidae
- Genus: Notamacropus
- Species: N. parryi

Binomial name
- Notamacropus parryi (Bennett, 1835)
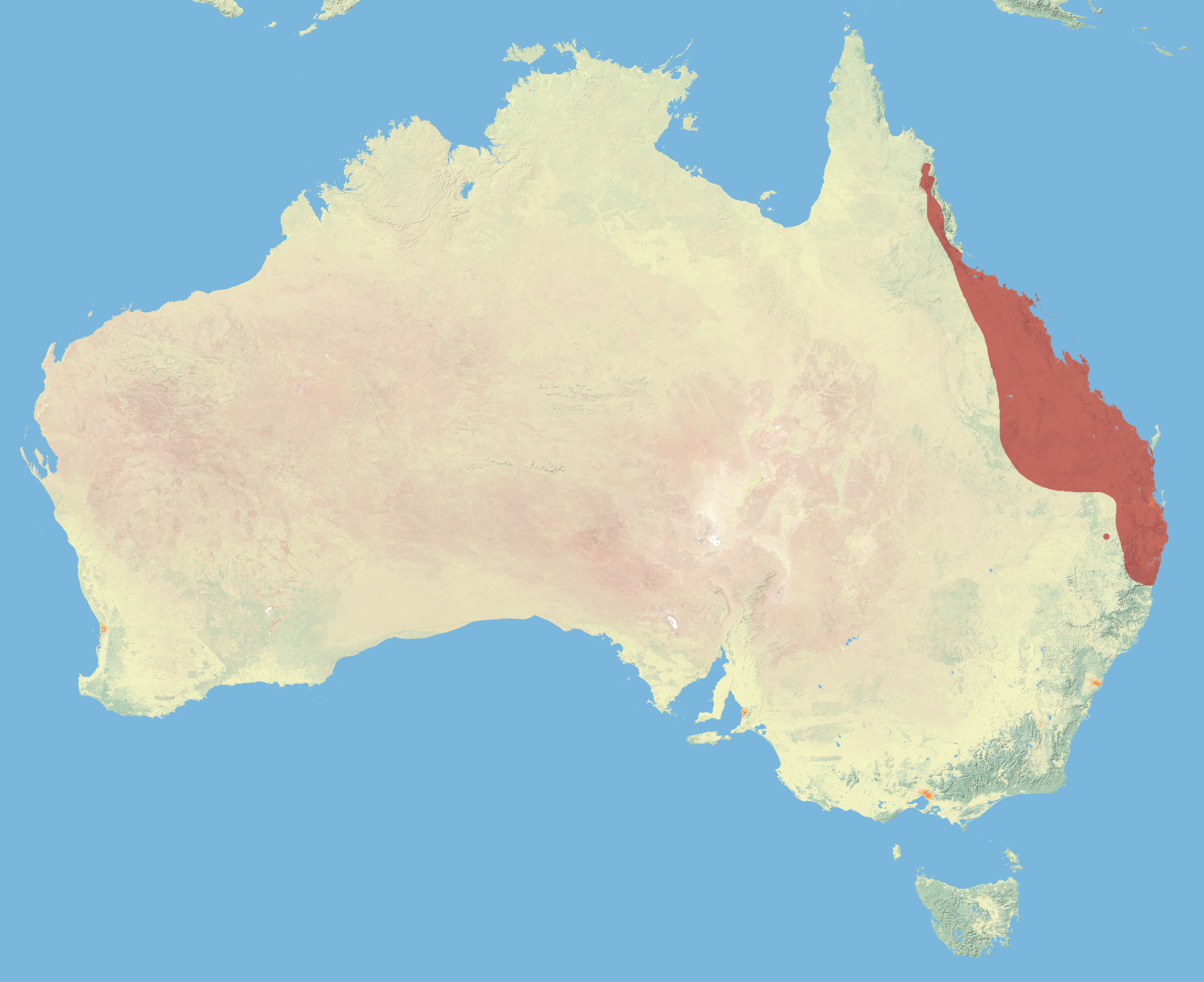
- Whiptail wallaby range

Synonyms
- Halmaturus parryi ssp. pallida Gray, 1837; Macropus parryi Bennett, 1835

= Whiptail wallaby =

Species of marsupial

The whiptail wallaby (Notamacropus parryi), also known as the pretty-faced wallaby, is a species of wallaby found in eastern Australia. It is locally common from Cooktown in Queensland to near Grafton in New South Wales.

== Description ==
It is distinguished by its paler colouring and white stripe under its face. Their faces have a chocolate-brown fur covering their muzzle. They are black and white on its chest and the rest is grey to brown fur. Males weigh from 14 to 26 kg (31 to 57 lb) and stand at a height from 70 to 93 cm (28 to 37 in). Females weigh from 7 to 15 kg (15 to 33 lb) and stand at a height from 65 to 75 cm (26 to 30 in).

== Lifestyle ==
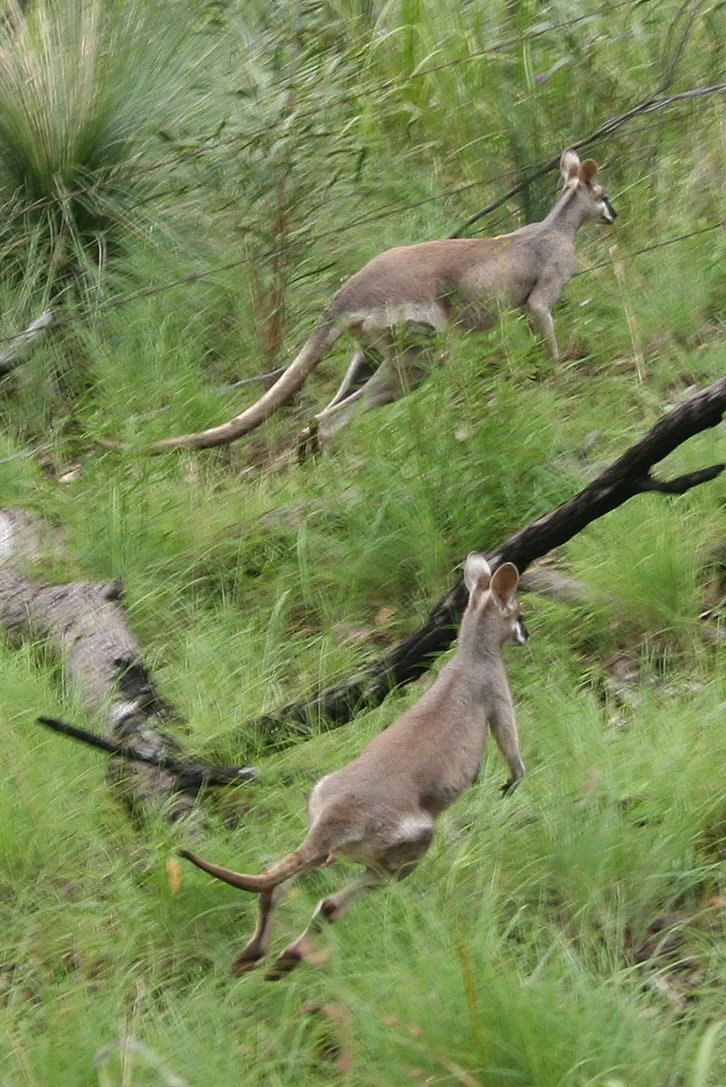
Whiptail wallabies hopping away

The whiptail wallaby lives in grasslands and woodlands particularly on hills or slopes. It is primarily a grazer. In grasslands, the whiptail wallaby primarily eats kangaroo grass. It also eats monocots in nearby creeks. It is primarily a diurnal species. It is active in the morning and late in the afternoon but continues into "to an unknown extent during the night".

=== Social behavior ===
The whiptail wallaby is a sociable species, sometimes coming together in mobs of up to 50. They live in a home range of up to 110 hectares (270 acres). The mob usually gathers in the afternoon during feeding. Some home ranges may overlap with others and the members of the mob take turns resting and guarding. The mobs contain all ages and sexes throughout the year, but seldom if ever are all members of a mob together at one time. Mobs often split into continually changing subgroups of fewer than 10 animals. Whiptail wallaby mobs have a linear hierarchy that is determined by ritualized "pawing", which is non-violent. They may also pull grass. Whiptail wallabies will cough to show submission. These bouts function only to determine access to oestrous females.

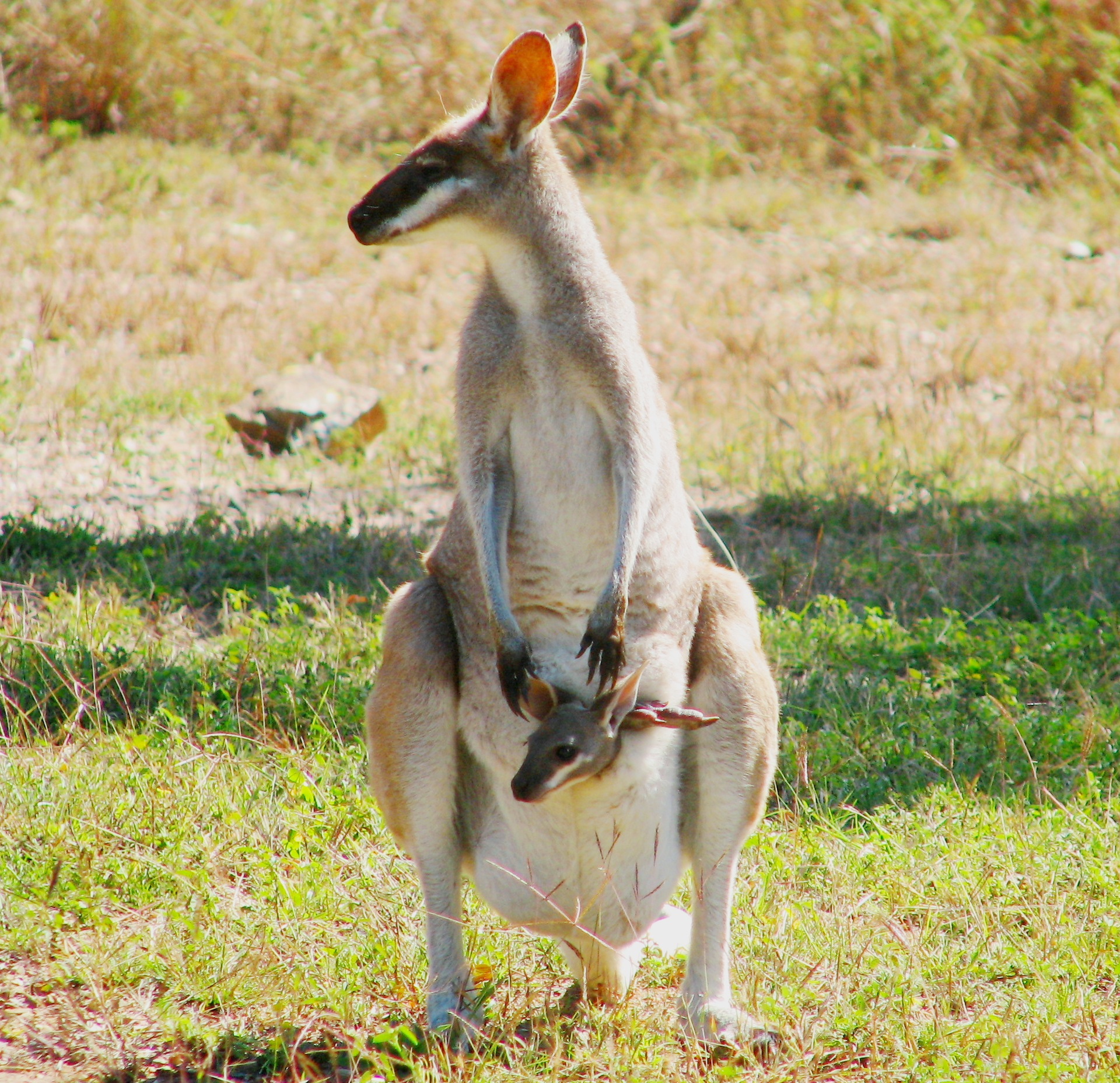
A female whiptail wallaby with a joey.

=== Reproduction ===
The most dominant males mate with the females. A male will wander through a gathering of females, sniffing their cloacae and tasting their urine. When a male finds a female close to oestrus, he stays with her. However, before she enters oestrus, he may be replaced by a more dominant male. The oestrus cycle for a whiptail wallaby lasts for only 42 days.

Joeys stay in their mothers' pouches for the first nine months. When they leave, they will still stay with them for up to 18 months. Whiptail joeys follow their mothers continuously and do not hide in vegetation. Subadult male whiptail wallabies sometimes leave their natal groups.

== Status ==
The whiptail wallaby is present in many protected areas. There appear to be no major threats to this species, although land clearing has probably resulted in the loss of suitable habitat and certainly has been responsible for range contraction at the southern end of its range.
