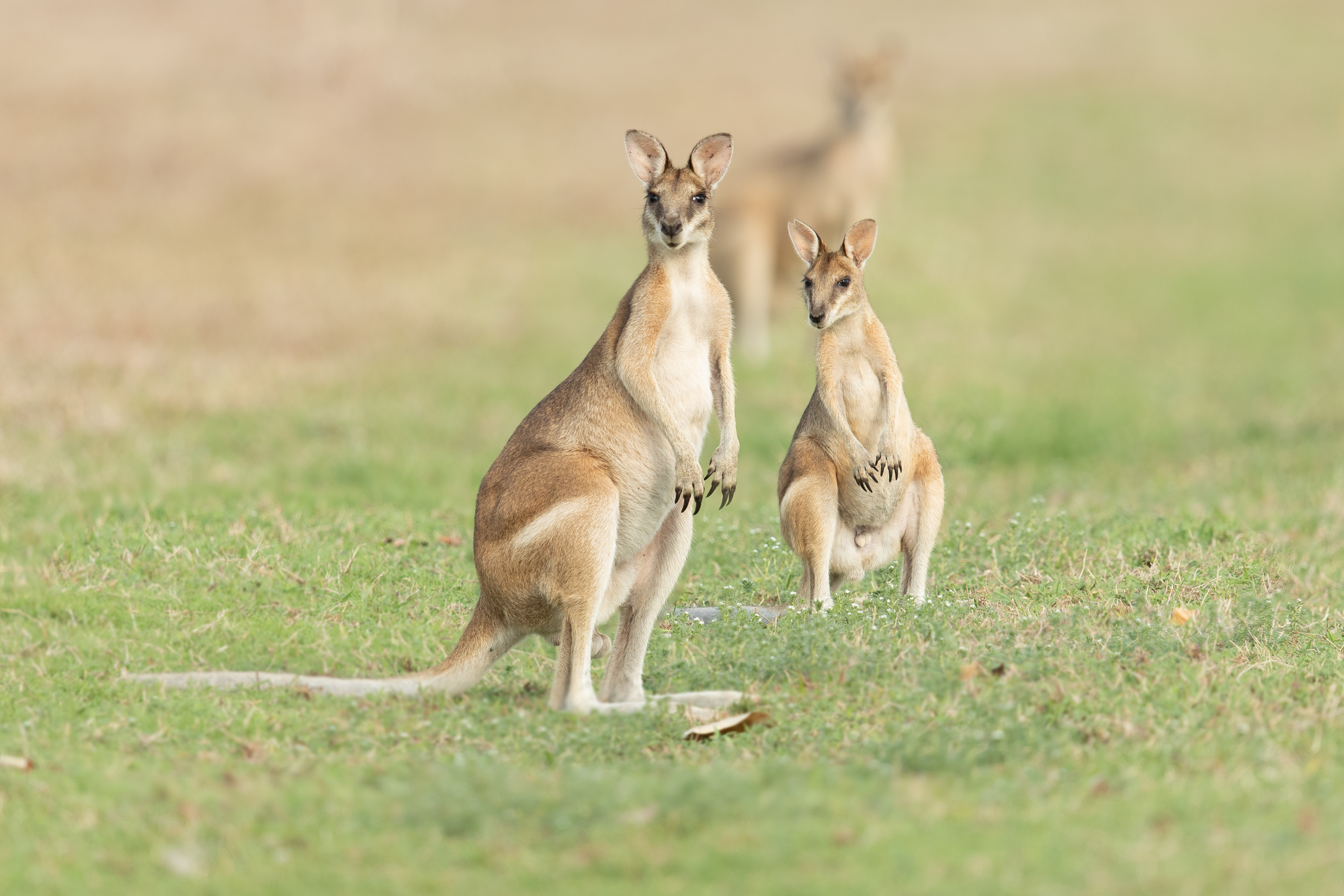

Conservation status
- Least Concern (IUCN 3.1)

Scientific classification
- Kingdom: Animalia
- Phylum: Chordata
- Class: Mammalia
- Infraclass: Marsupialia
- Order: Diprotodontia
- Family: Macropodidae
- Genus: Notamacropus
- Species: N. agilis

Binomial name
- Notamacropus agilis (Gould, 1842)
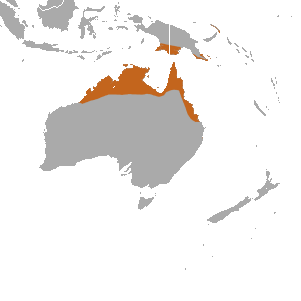
- Agile wallaby range

Synonyms
- Halmaturus agilis Gould, 1842; Macropus agilis (Gould, 1842)

= Agile wallaby =

Species of marsupial

The agile wallaby (Notamacropus agilis), also known as the sandy wallaby, is a species of wallaby found in northern Australia and southern New Guinea. It is the most common wallaby in north Australia. The agile wallaby is a sandy colour, becoming paler below. It is sometimes solitary and at other times sociable and grazes on grasses and other plants. The agile wallaby is not considered threatened.

== Subspecies ==
The four subspecies of the agile wallaby are:

- N. a. agilis, the nominate subspecies, is found in the Northern Territory.
- N. a. jardinii is found on the northern and eastern coasts of Queensland.
- N. a. nigrescens is found in the Kimberley and Arnhem Land regions of Western Australia.
- N. a. papuanus is found in southern New Guinea and some neighbouring islands.

== Description ==
Male agile wallabies are considerably larger than females, having a head and body length of up to 85 cm (33 in) and weighing 16 to 27 kg (35 to 60 lb) while the females grow to 72 cm (28 in) in length and weigh 9 to 15 kg (20 to 33 lb). The tails of both sexes are long and flexible, giving a total length of double the head and body length. They have relatively large ears, which are edged with black, and the tip of the tail is also black. Their backs are sandy brown while their underparts are whitish. They have a dark stripe between the ears, a pale cheek stripe on each side of the face and another pale streak across the thighs.

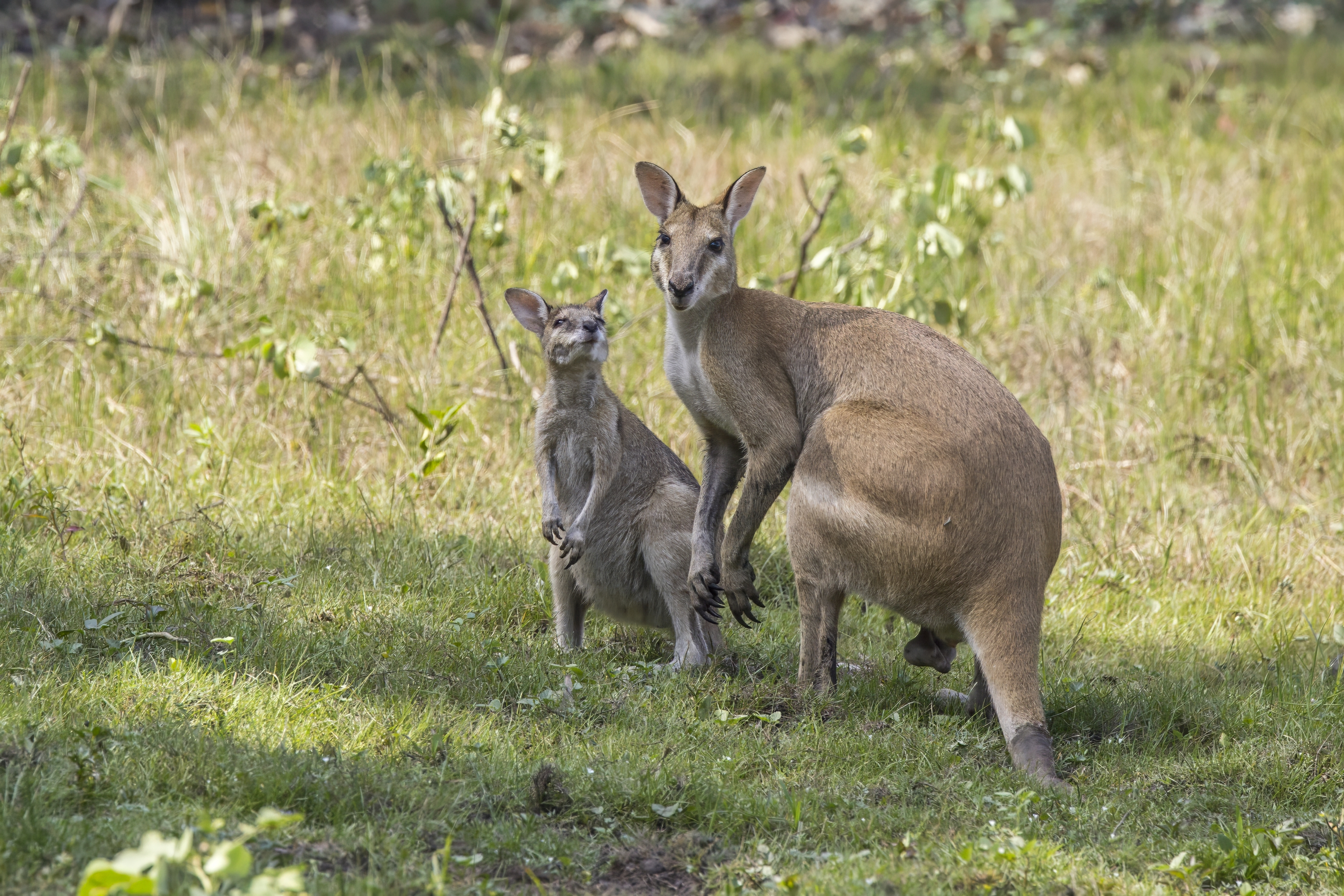
male and juvenile N. a. agilis, NT

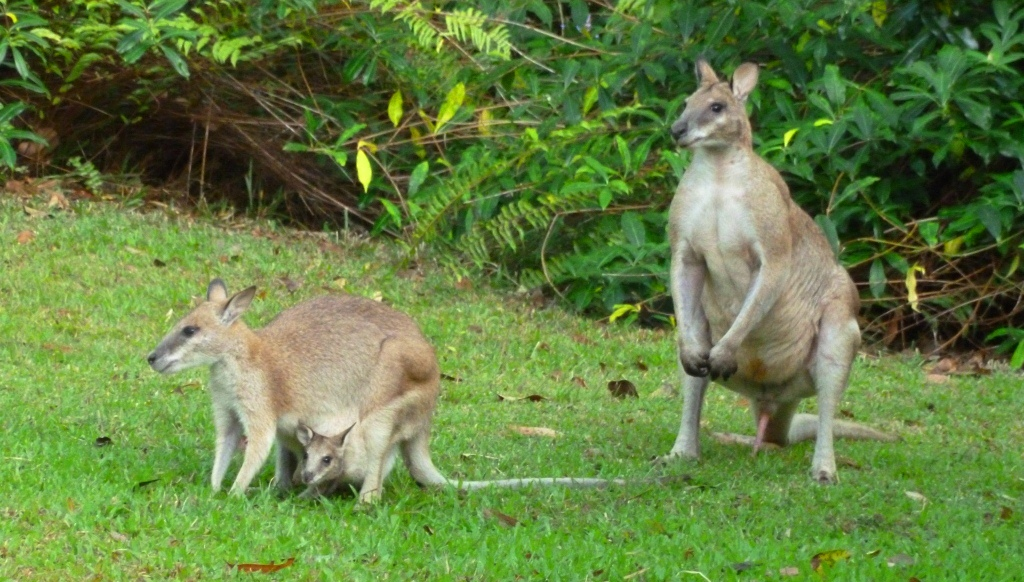
male, female and joey N. a. jardinii, QLD

== Distribution and habitat ==
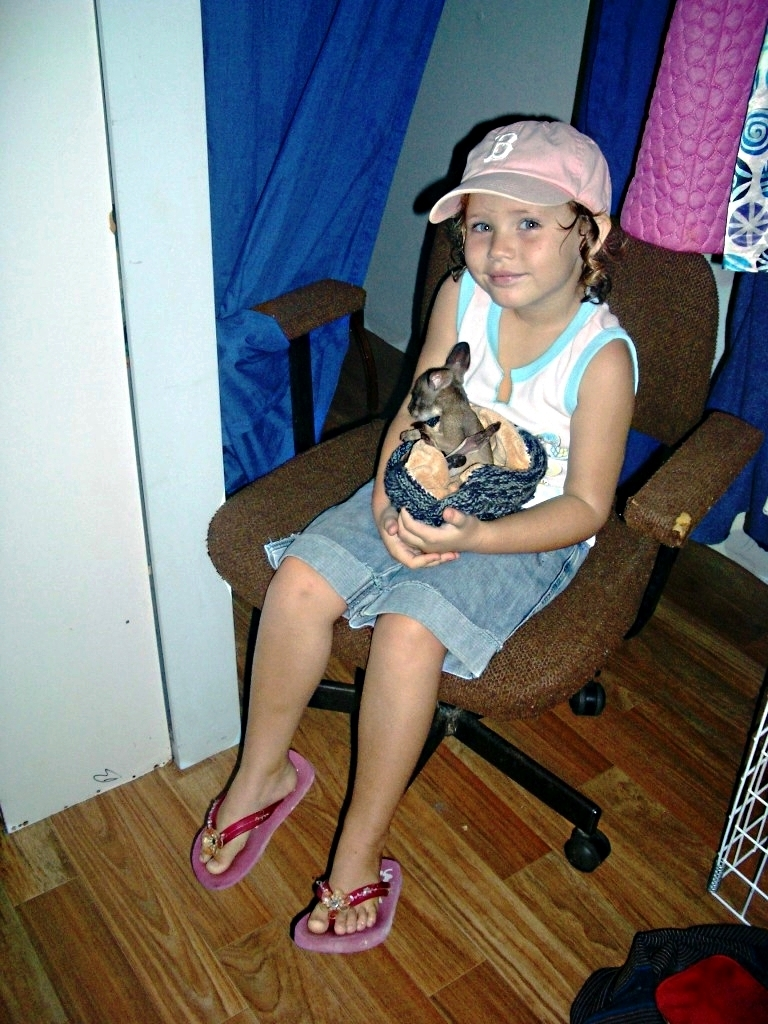
Child holding rescued Agile Wallaby joey. Cooktown. 2008

The agile wallaby is found in northern Australia, Papua New Guinea and the Indonesian province of South Papua. It is the most common wallaby over much of the north of Australia. In northern Australia and down the eastern coast of Queensland it is quite common, and there are isolated populations in southeastern Queensland around Coomera, Jacobs Well and Hope Island. It is also present, though not common, on Stradbroke Island and on Woogoompah Island in the Southern Moreton Bay Islands, and it may still be present on Peel Island. In Australia its typical habitats are dry open woodland, heaths, dunes and grassland. It is often present in the vicinity of rivers and billabongs. When grass is in short supply, it sometimes browses on shrubs or moves onto agricultural land, including sugar cane plantations.

== Behaviour ==
In general, the agile wallaby is a solitary animal, but it sometimes forms into groups when feeding on open pastures, a behaviour that may help with predator awareness. The agile wallaby feeds mainly at night on grasses, legumes, and other herbaceous plants, but may also forage by day, especially in the wet season. In the dry season, the animal's range grows larger as the quality of the grazing deteriorates, and the diet expands to include flowers, fruit, twigs, fallen leaves, roots, and bark. In the dry season in Boodjamulla National Park in Queensland, when food is in short supply, it has been observed pulling up seedling Livistona palms with its teeth, eating the roots and stems, and discarding the leaves. When they are available, it eats the fruits of these palms, but in the dry season it also crushes and eats the hard seeds. It also consumes other seeds that have passed through the guts of fruit-eating birds. It sometimes digs holes in dry creeks and billabongs to search for water, and this is thought to help it avoid being killed by the saltwater crocodile (Crocodylus porosus) that can be found beside rivers.

Breeding takes place at any time of the year, with the female becoming receptive soon after giving birth. Male behaviour includes "play-fighting", leaping into the air, and sinuously lashing the tail. After a brief courtship, mating takes place after which an embryonic diapause occurs, in which the embryo remains in a state of dormancy before implanting. The gestation period is about 30 days, after which the young wallaby is born and makes its way to its mother's pouch. It remains there for 7–8 months and is weaned at about 11 months.

== Status ==
The agile wallaby has a wide range and is common over much of that range. It faces no major threats; however, in New Guinea it is shot for bushmeat and in Australia it is sometimes killed by farmers as a pest. It is present in a number of protected areas in Australia, but this is not the case in New Guinea. Overall, the population is thought to be declining, but the total population is large and the rate of decline is slow, so the IUCN considers this species to be of least concern.

In Western Province, Papua New Guinea, agile wallabies are hunted by local indigenous peoples using fire drives.

== In Aboriginal language and culture ==
In the Bininj Kunwok language the male agile wallaby is known as warradjangkal, and the female as merlbbe. According to Kunwinjku elder Peterson Nganjmirra, the "small one" (joey) is known as njip.

== In Indonesian language and culture ==
In Indonesia, the agile wallaby is also called walep saham or walabi saham, from the name of the animal in the Marind language, saham. It is a sacred totem animal of the Marind people and is traditionally hunted.
