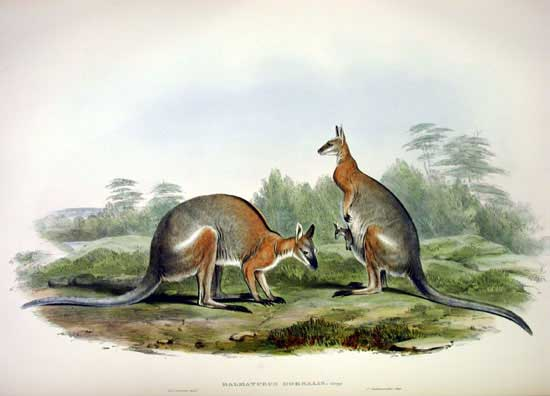
- Artist's rendition
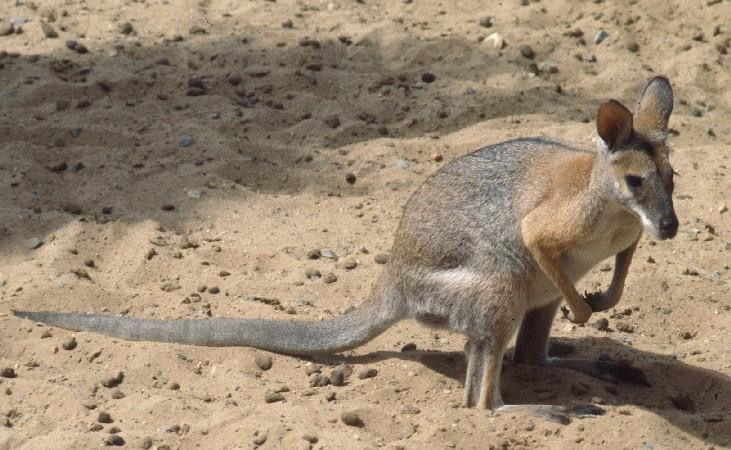

Conservation status
- Least Concern (IUCN 3.1)

Scientific classification
- Kingdom: Animalia
- Phylum: Chordata
- Class: Mammalia
- Infraclass: Marsupialia
- Order: Diprotodontia
- Family: Macropodidae
- Genus: Notamacropus
- Species: N. dorsalis

Binomial name
- Notamacropus dorsalis (J. E. Gray, 1837)
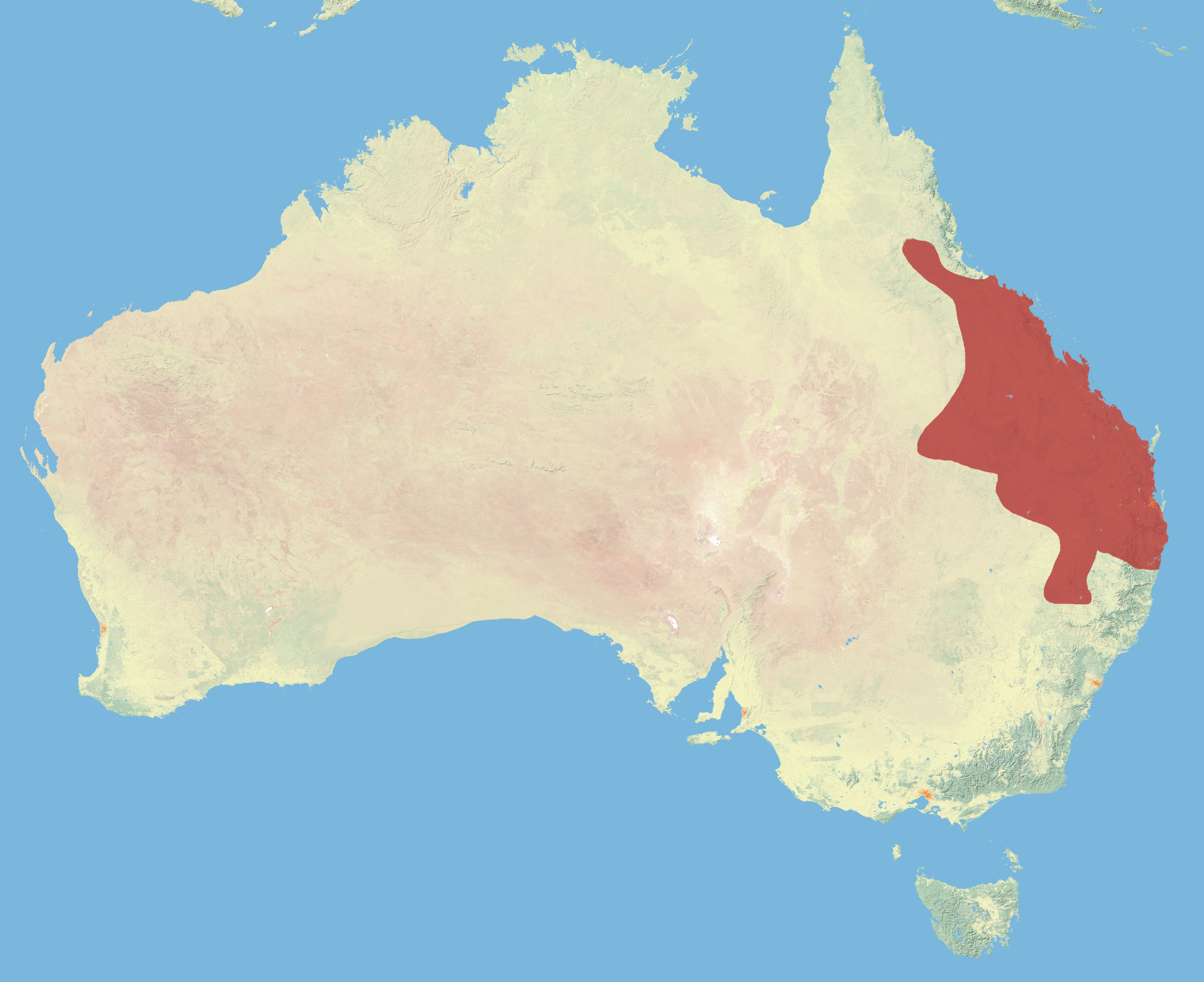
- Black-striped wallaby range

Synonyms
- Halmaturus dorsalis Gray, 1837; Macropus dorsalis (Gray, 1837)

= Black-striped wallaby =

Species of marsupial

The black-striped wallaby (Notamacropus dorsalis), also known as the scrub wallaby or eastern brush wallaby, is a medium-sized wallaby found in Australia, from Townsville in Queensland to Narrabri in New South Wales. In New South Wales, it is only found west of the Great Dividing Range. It is decreasing in these areas, but is not classified as threatened as a species yet. The New South Wales population, however, is classified as endangered.

The black-striped wallaby resembles the mainland Australian subspecies of the red-necked wallaby, differing in the black line down its back, a white stripe over the hip and more red colouration (extending down the arms and further down the abdomen). It is a shy, predominantly nocturnal grazer and is not well-known, owing to its preference for thick scrub, where it may easily be hidden. Monocotyledonous plants (leaves and seedheads) seem to constitute preferred food.
