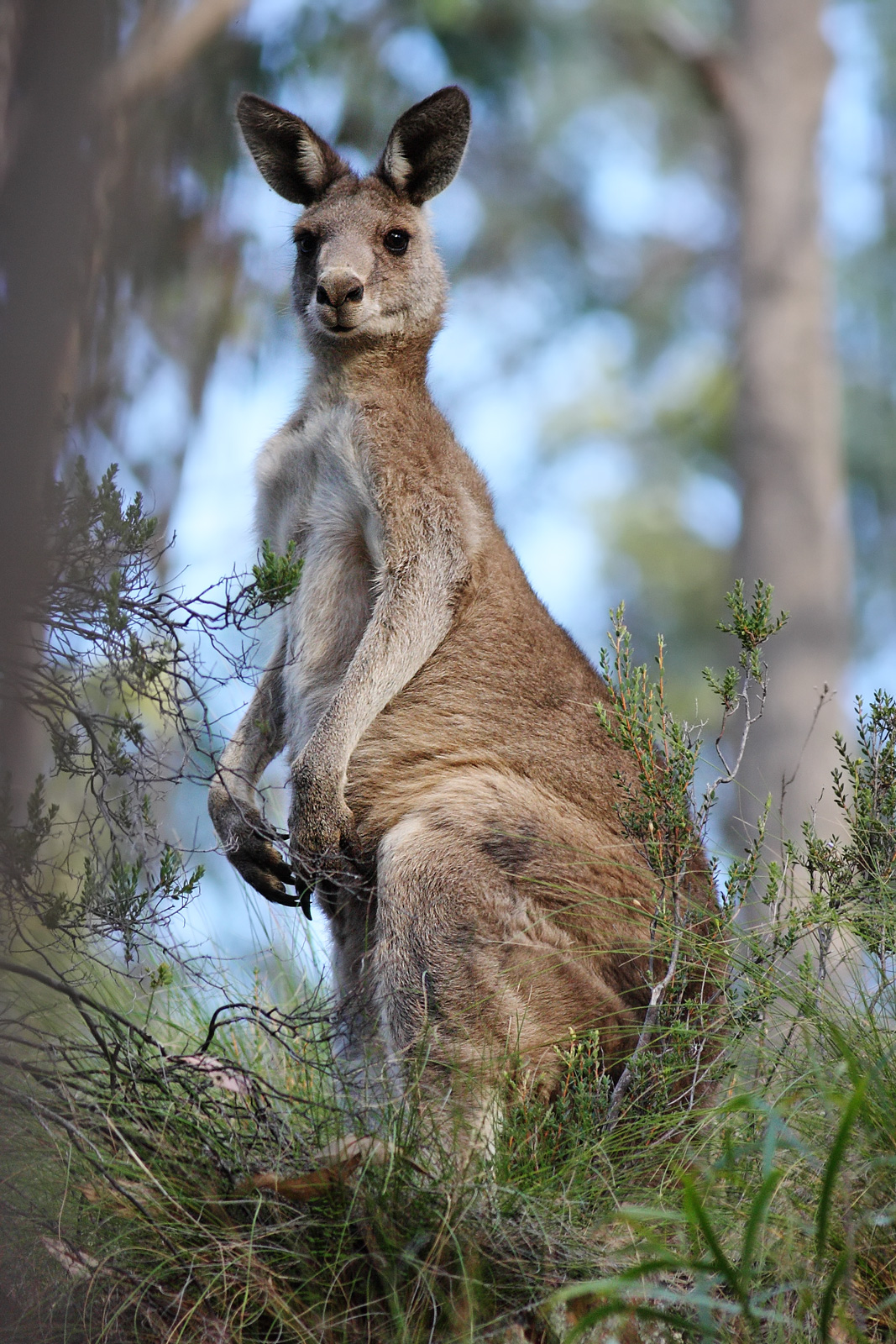
- Eastern grey kangaroo

Scientific classification
- Kingdom: Animalia
- Phylum: Chordata
- Class: Mammalia
- Infraclass: Marsupialia
- Order: Diprotodontia
- Family: Macropodidae
- Subfamily: Macropodinae
- Genus: Macropus; Shaw, 1790

Type species
- Macropus giganteus Shaw, 1790
- Macropus distribution M. fuliginosus in red, M. giganteus in blue

= Macropus =

Macropus Temporal range: Miocene - Present

Genus of marsupials

Macropus, from the Ancient Greek words μακρός (makrós), meaning "long", and πούς (pous), meaning "foot", is a marsupial genus in the family Macropodidae. It has two extant species of large terrestrial kangaroos. Thirteen known extinct species are recognised. The type species is the eastern grey kangaroo.

== Taxonomy ==
In 2019, a reassessment of macropod taxonomy determined that Osphranter and Notamacropus, formerly considered subgenera, should be moved to the genus level. This change was accepted by the Australian Faunal Directory in 2020.

=== Extant Species ===
Image	Scientific name	Distribution
	Western grey kangaroo (Macropus fuliginosus)	
	Eastern grey kangaroo (Macropus giganteus)	

=== Fossils ===
A currently-unnamed Pleistocene Macropus species from Australia was the largest kangaroo ever, with an estimated mass of around 274 kg (~604 lb).

- †Macropus dryas
- †Macropus gouldi
- †Macropus narada
- †Macropus piltonensis
- †Macropus rama
- †Macropus woodsi
- †Macropus pavana
- †Macropus thor
- †Macropus ferragus
- †Macropus mundjabus
- †Macropus pan
- †Macropus pearsoni
- †Macropus titan (or †Macropus giganteus titan)
