= Kangaroo emblems and popular culture =

Cultural depictions of kangaroos

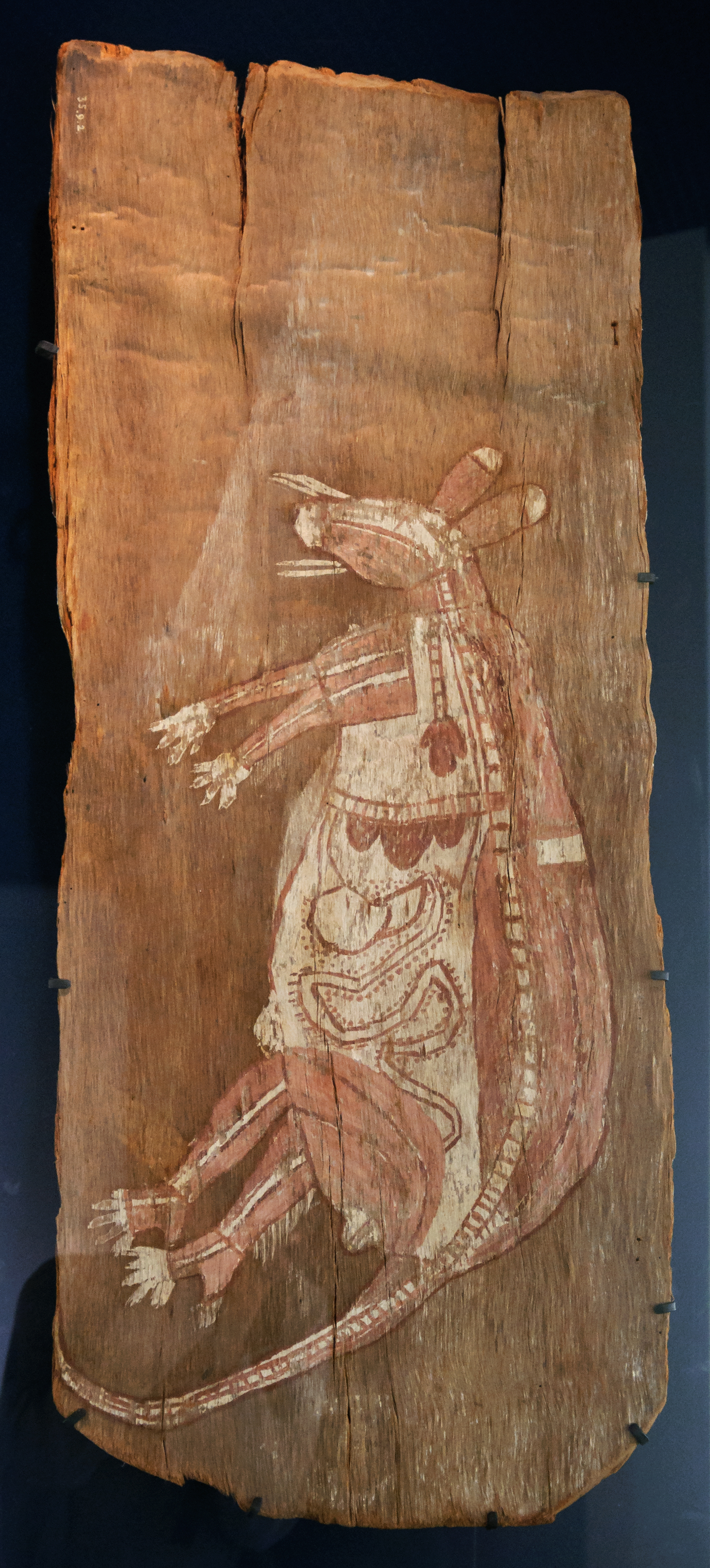
Kangaroo totemic ancestor – Australian Aboriginal bark painting, Arnhem Land, c. 1915.

Kangaroos, Wallabies and other Macropodidae have become emblems and symbols of Australia, as well as appearing in popular culture both internationally and within Australia itself.

Kangaroos are part of cultural and spiritual significance for many Indigenous Australians. Since its European discovery, Kangaroos have since become an emblem of Australia, appearing in their coat of arms and in many state and city coat of arms, Australian logos such as the Qantas logo, names of Australian sport teams, mascots such as the Boxing Kangaroo and in public art. Kangaroos are also well represented in film, television, songs, toys and souvenirs around the world.

== European first encounters ==
The kangaroo was considered a unique oddity when Captain Cook's HMB Endeavour arrived back in England in 1771 with a specimen on board. Over time it has come to symbolise Australia and Australian values.

Joseph Banks, the naturalist on the Endeavour voyage, commissioned George Stubbs to paint a portrait of the kangaroo specimen. When the official account of the voyage was published in 1773, it was illustrated with an engraving of Stubbs' kangaroo. From that time on, the kangaroo quickly came to symbolise the Australian continent, appearing in exhibitions, collections, art and printed works across Europe.

== Kangaroo status ==
It took a long time for the kangaroo to achieve official recognition in Australia. Despite being a "declared noxious animal" because of its reputation for damaging crops and fences and competing with domestic animals for resources, the kangaroo finally achieved official recognition with its inclusion on Australia's coat of arms in 1908. The kangaroo is now popularly regarded as Australia's unofficial animal emblem.

== Kangaroo emblems and logos ==
Australian Coat-of-Arms

The kangaroo and emu are bearers on the Australian Coat of Arms. It has been claimed these animals were chosen to signify a country moving 'forward' because of a common belief that neither can move backward.

Two red kangaroos serve as bearers to the Coat of Arms of Western Australia.

Australia's national airline, Qantas, uses a bounding kangaroo for its logo. The kangaroo has always been part of the Qantas logo, and the airline has previously been known informally as "The Flying Kangaroo".

Tourism Australia makes use of the kangaroo in its logo to "help ensure instant recognition for Australia around the world".

The Australian Grown logo uses a golden kangaroo in a green triangle to show that a product is made or grown in Australia.

The Royal Australian Air Force roundel features a bounding red kangaroo.

Warships of the Royal Australian Navy have red kangaroo symbols (based on the kangaroo on the reverse of the Australian penny) fixed to either side of their superstructure or funnel. This originated during the Korean War: as the destroyer HMAS Anzac was repeatedly mistaken for a British warship, her executive officer had a brass 'weathervane' in the shape of a kangaroo made and mounted to the ship's mainmast.

The kangaroo is part of the official emblem of the Royal Australian Regiment with a kangaroo in between two Lee–Enfield bolt-action rifles.

The Victorian coat of arms includes the upper portion of a kangaroo holding an Imperial Crown in its paws.

The red kangaroo is the animal emblem of the Northern Territory.

The kangaroo is the official emblem of Northern Territory Police.

British clothing and headwear company Kangol, known for its berets, features a kangaroo in its logo.

The front panel of the honour caps of the 1899 and 1904 British Lions rugby union tourists to Australia featured a silhouette of standing kangaroo, replicating the marsupial (wallaroo) cap layout originated by Sydney's Wallaroo FC. This custom was followed since 1908 by rugby league clubs and representative teams including the Australian Kangaroos.

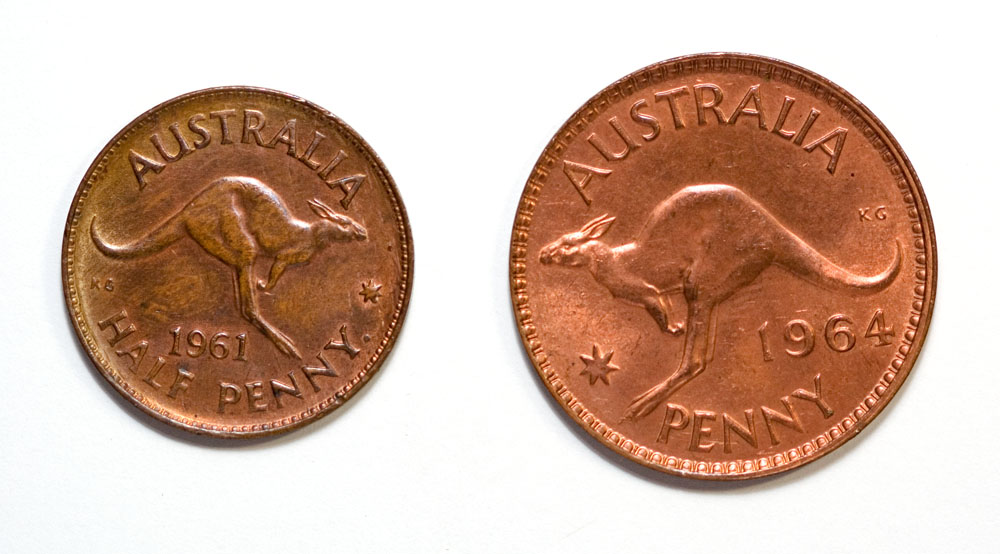
Australian 1961 half penny and 1964 penny with Kangaroos.

== Kangaroos and coins ==
The kangaroo has been featured on coins on the pre-decimal Australian pound and decimal coins of the Australian dollar. The kangaroo appears on the pre-decimal penny and half-penny coins. Five kangaroos are featured on the one dollar coin.

== Kangaroo mascots in Australia ==
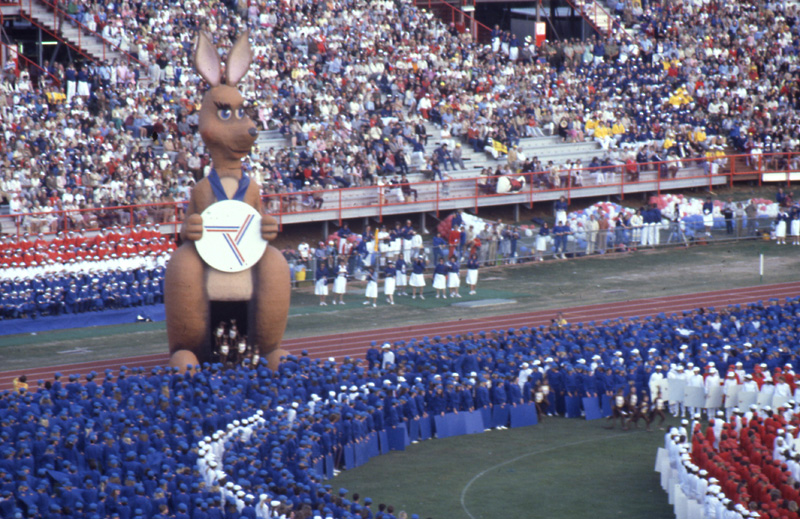
Matilda, at the 1982 Commonwealth Games

The boxing kangaroo – mascot for the Australia II team in the 1983 America's Cup. This rendition of the kangaroo has become a sporting icon, known informally as the green and gold "Sporting Kangaroo", and is highly popular with cricket crowds and international sporting events which feature Australian participation.

Matilda, the mascot at the 1982 Commonwealth Games held in Brisbane, Queensland, Australia, was represented by both a cartoon kangaroo and a 13-metre high (42 feet 8 inches) mechanical kangaroo (which winked at the spectators during the opening and closing ceremonies). The 'medal', which was worn by both the cartoon and mechanical versions of Matilda, features the 1982 Commonwealth Games logo — a stylised representation of a kangaroo bounding (in "flight") – similar to the pose of the kangaroo featured on the pre-decimal half-penny coin.

During the First World War, pet kangaroos and toy kangaroos were a popular choice of mascot for Australian servicemen.

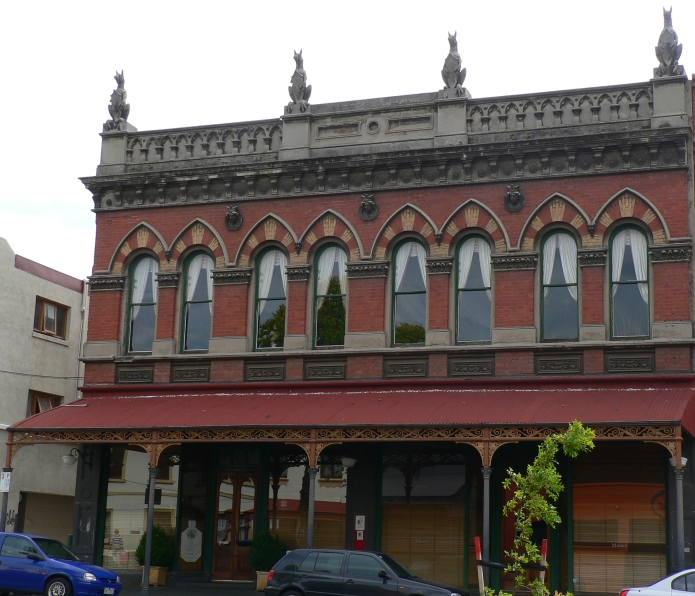
Kangaroo gargoyles atop The Carlton Club (built 1889) in Carlton, Victoria.

== Architectural references ==
The first uses of Kangaroo ornaments as architectural expression appeared during the Victorian era. This was at first limited to the use of the coat of arms on buildings; however, kangaroos soon became used as decorative motifs on their own in some commercial buildings, particularly in Melbourne.

It was the Federation architecture, however, which brought native ornamentation into the mainstream, so that kangaroos began to be mass-produced as ornamentation on domestic houses in the large cities, as part of an Australiana movement and effort to create a uniquely Australian style. Examples of this decoration include the ornamental terracotta tile capping on residential roofs. Reproduction products using Kangaroos are still used today.

== Public art and sculpture ==
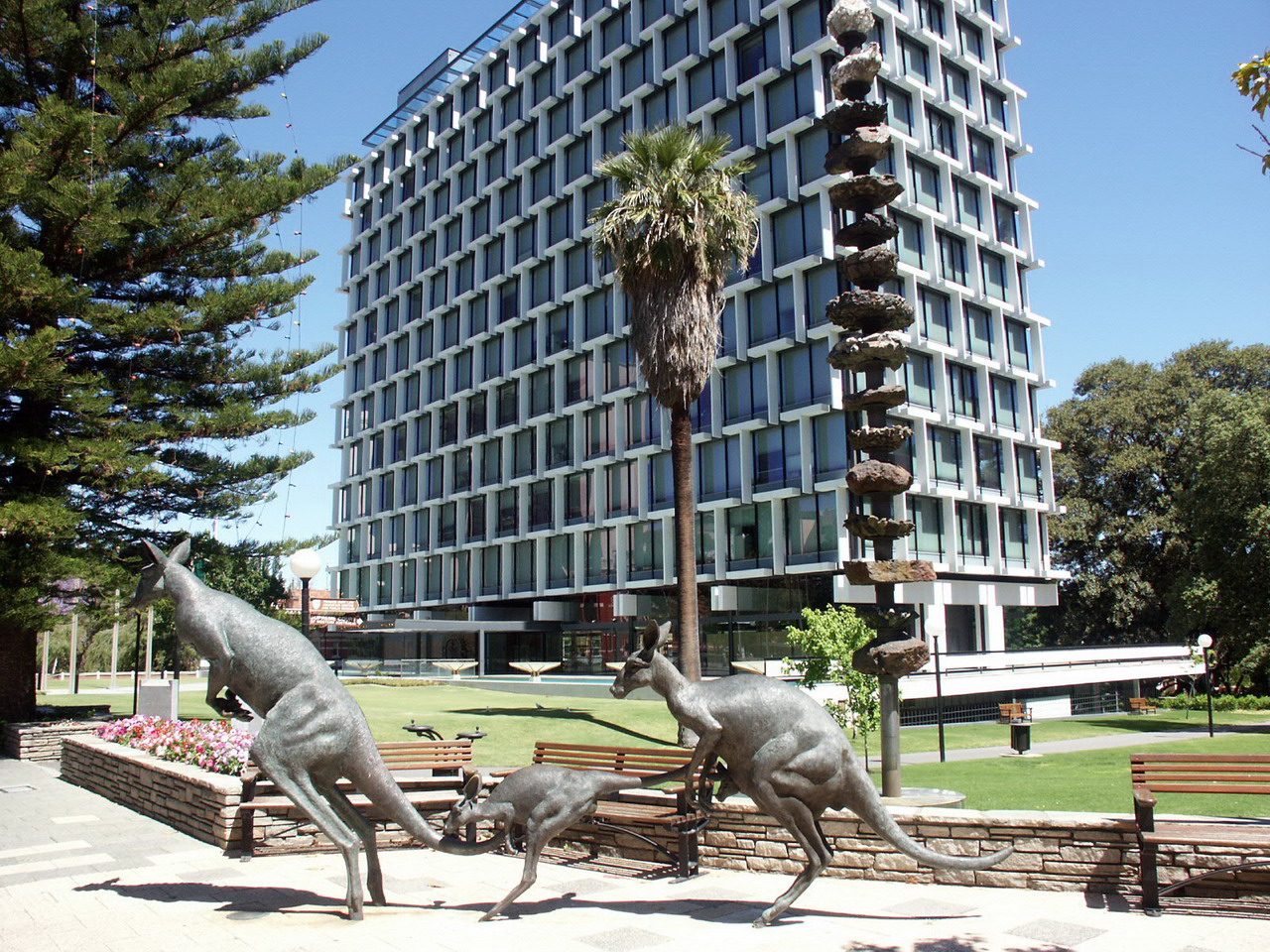
Perth Council House kangaroo sculptures

Kangaroo motifs have been used as a form of public art.

Notable examples include:

- Victorian lamp post (1880) in front of the Royal Exhibition Building at the Carlton Gardens in Carlton, Victoria
- Petrie Tableaux sculpture (1989). In front of Brisbane City Hall at King George Square by Stephen Walker
- Perth kangaroo sculptures (1996, 1997 & 2000). St Georges Terrace, Perth, by Anne Neil, Joan Walsh-Smith, Charles Smith
- City Roo sculptures (1999). George Street, Brisbane, Queensland – made from scrap metal by Christopher Trotter
- Eastern grey kangaroo sculpture in the City Botanic Gardens
- Kangaroo and joey sculpture at Queens Park in Ipswich, Queensland
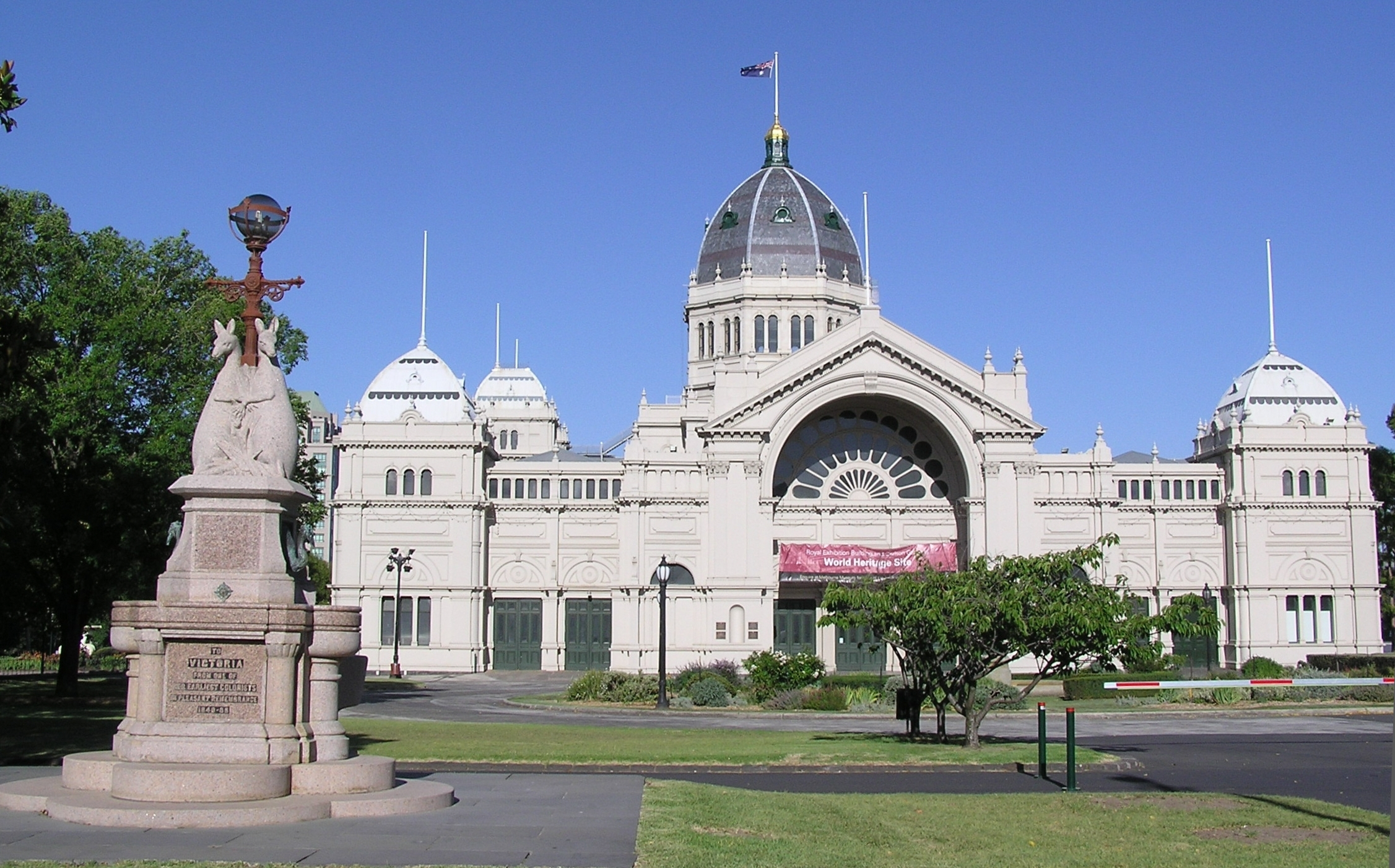
Kangaroo ornaments on a Victorian lamp post at the Royal Exhibition Building

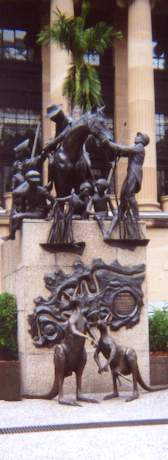
Petrie Tableaux sculpture in front of Brisbane City Hall

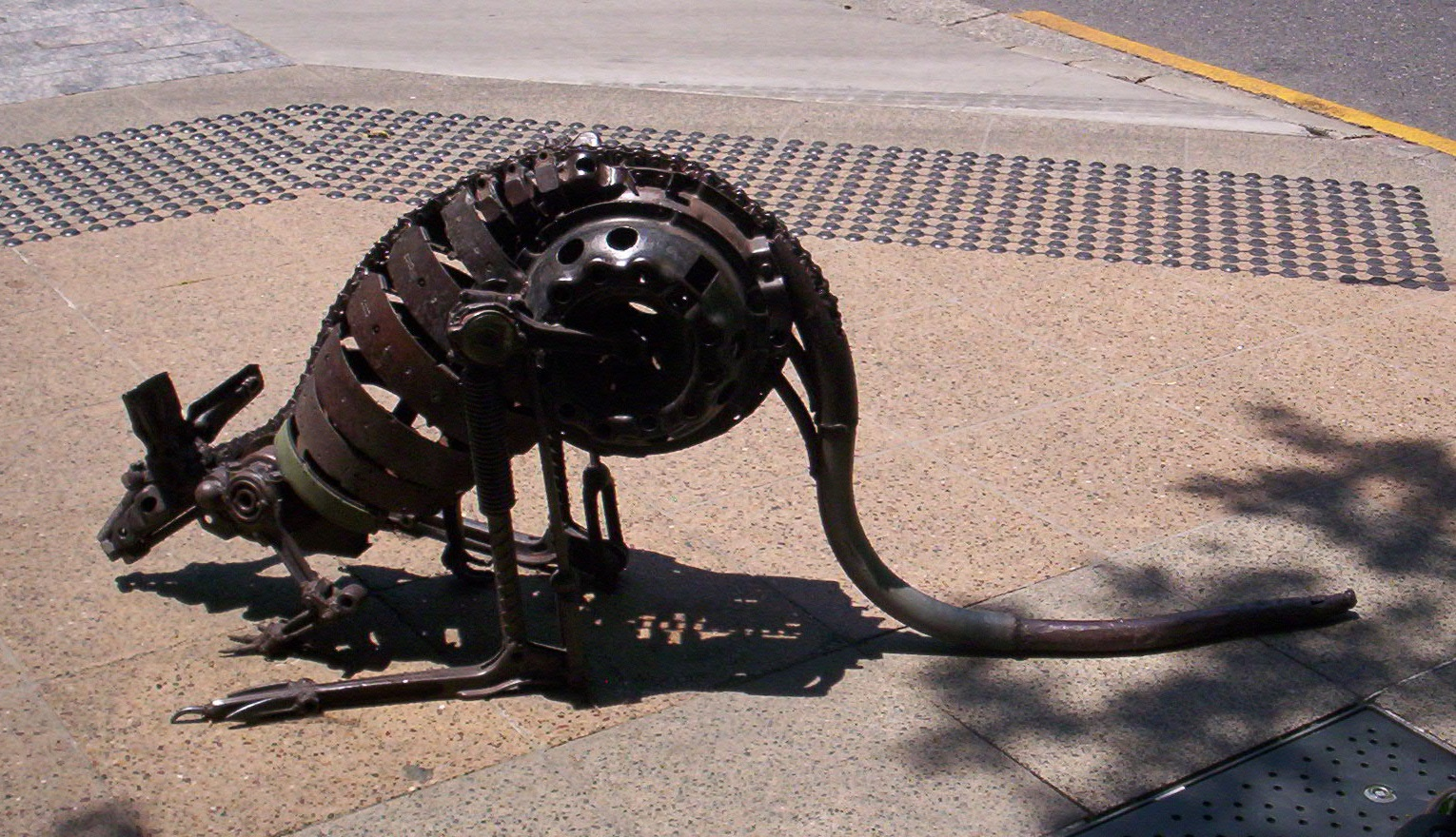
One of the City Roo sculptures in George Street, Brisbane

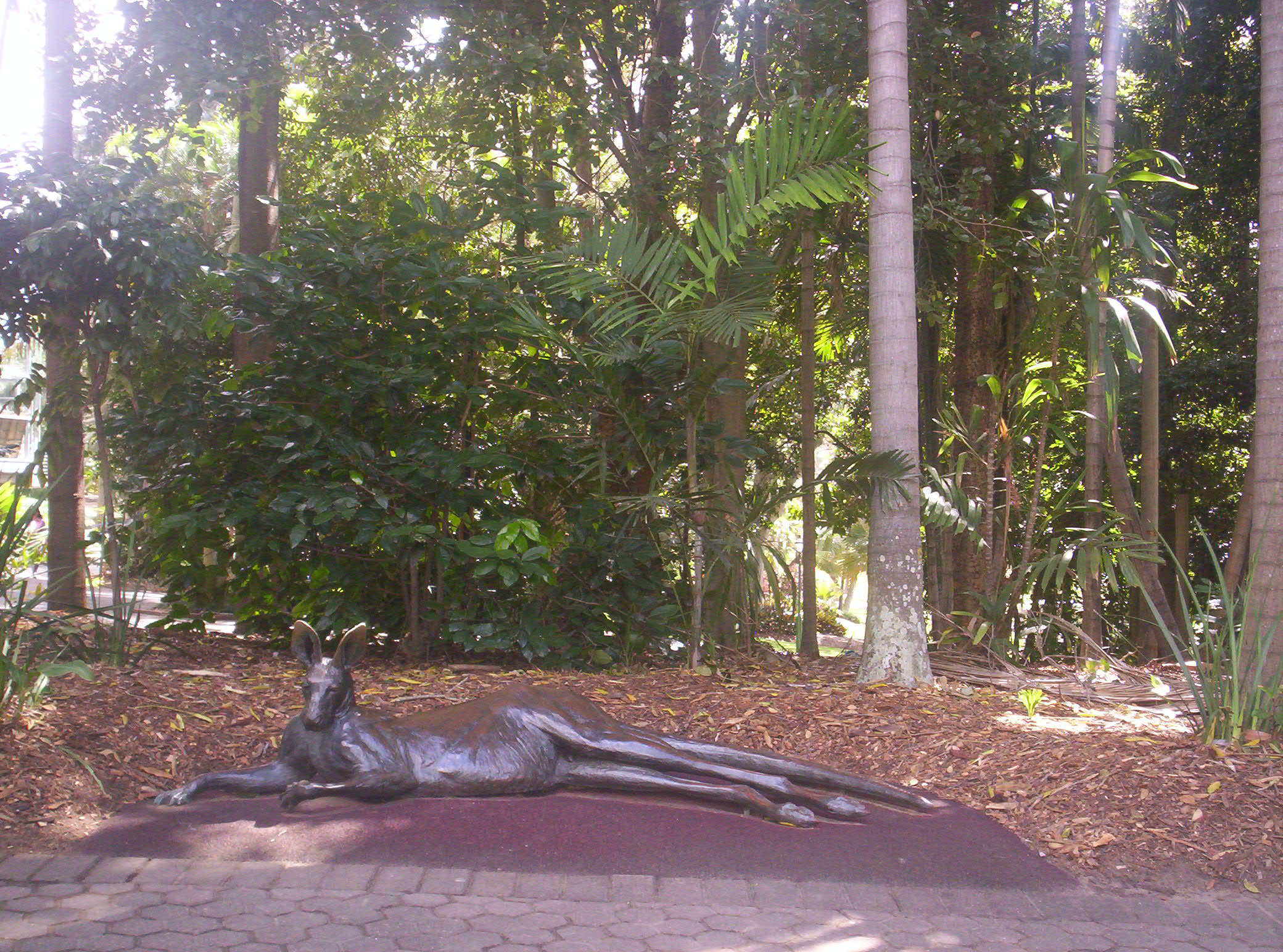
Eastern Grey kangaroo sculpture in the City Botanic Gardens

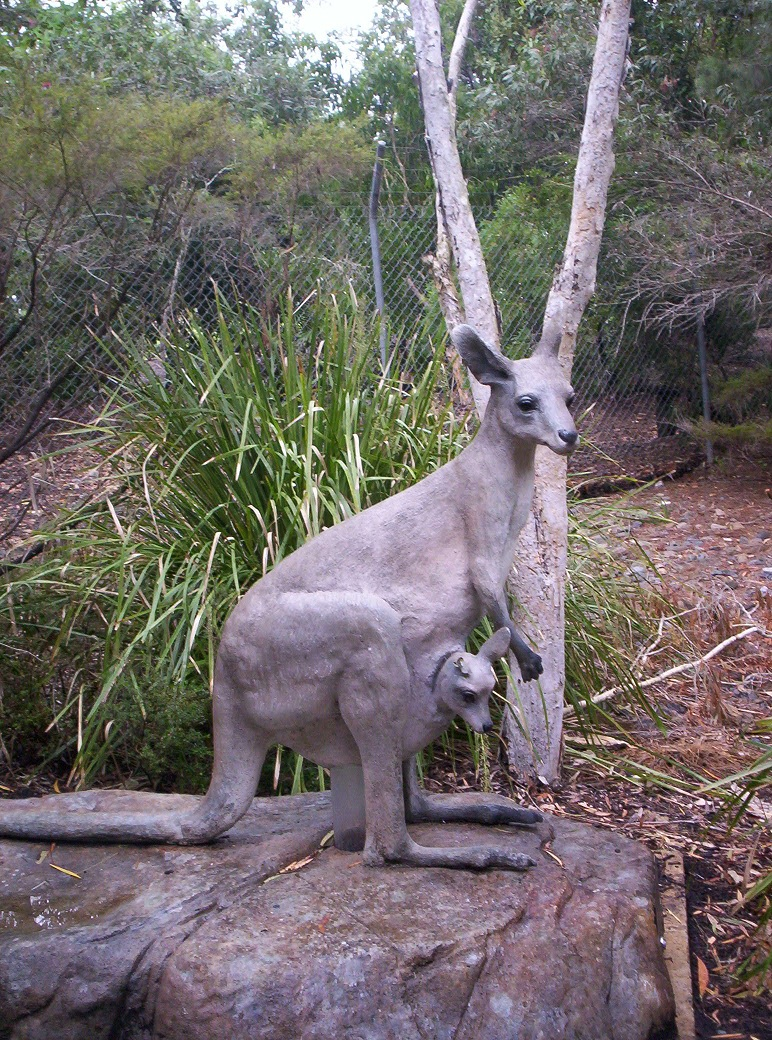
Kangaroo and joey sculpture at Queens Park in Ipswich, Queensland

== Decorative arts and design ==
An early depiction of a kangaroo on an item of decorative art is the Macintosh & Degraves Token Shilling 1823. Another early example is the Garret salver. This item of Tasmanian colonial silver incorporates a kangaroo, an emu and wattle branches in its design.

The kangaroo has continued to be incorporated into decorative designs by craftspeople and designers in Australia and elsewhere in the world. The Terence Lane kangaroo collection at the National Museum of Australia consists of more than 150 objects and ephemera in a wide range of styles produced over a period of 150 years. The collection ranges from a one-metre-high Doulton ceramic kangaroo umbrella stand to small items of jewellery.

== Cultural references ==
Kangaroos are frequently depicted in films, television, songs, toys and souvenirs around the world.

=== Television and films ===
Skippy the Bush Kangaroo, star of the 1960s Australian children's television series.

Wake in Fright is a 1971 movie which includes a controversial kangaroo hunting scene containing graphic footage of kangaroos actually being shot. In a more comical vein, the 1986 film Crocodile Dundee features a scene in which the title character frightens away kangaroo hunters by making them think that a kangaroo is shooting back at them.

Matilda is a 1978 movie starring Elliott Gould about a promoter working with a kangaroo.

Kangaroo Jack is the title character of an American film of the same name.

A giant kangaroo is featured in the movie Welcome to Woop Woop.

The Hallmark Properties television series Zoobilee Zoo has a character named Whazzat Kangaroo (the Canadian actress and singer Stephanie Louise "Stevie" Vallance plays this role).

=== Songs ===
Kangaroos are mentioned, or featured, in the Rolf Harris songs "Tie Me Kangaroo Down, Sport" and "Six White Boomers".

Kangaroos are also mentioned in the Peter Allen song "Tenterfield Saddler".

Kangaroos are also mentioned in Holden jingle "Football, meat pies, kangaroos and Holden cars".

Kangaroos are also mentioned in the songs "Christmas Where The Gum Trees Grow", "Christmas in the Scrub" and "The Five Days of Christmas".

=== Books ===
There is a "Sour Kangaroo" in the Dr. Seuss tale Horton Hears a Who!.

Kanga and Roo are fictional mother and son kangaroos in the popular series of children's books about Winnie-the-Pooh.

Kidding Kangaroo in the Sweet Pickles book series by Ruth Lerner Perle, Jacquelyn Reinach and Richard Hefter.

One of the several intelligent races described in the fantasy novel Shadowkeep, written by Alan Dean Foster, are high-bounding, fun-loving marsupials, known as "roos" and obviously meant to be intelligent kangaroos.

A kangaroo is shot and killed by Ernest in The Swiss Family Robinson, a book written by Johann Wyss.

=== Animation ===
Kiko the Kangaroo is a recurring character in the Terrytoons cartoons.

Kanga and Roo are mother and son kangaroos in the popular series of cartoons about Winnie-the-Pooh.

A team of kangaroo basketball players feature in the French cartoon series Kangoo and its spin-off/prequel Kangoo Juniors.

In several Looney Tunes/Merrie Melodies cartoons, Sylvester the Cat is beaten up by Hippety Hopper the baby kangaroo, who always accomplishes this feat after escaping from the captivity of humans who have attempted to take him to a zoo in assorted American cities and whom Sylvester believes to be a giant mouse.

In Tom and Jerry: The Fast and the Furry, the commentators are holding a kangaroo by the leash when the racers reach Australia.

In the British punk style comic strips Tank Girl, the protagonist's boyfriend is Booga, the mutant anthro-kangaroo. There are some other minor kangaroo characters. In the U.S. movie Tank Girl, slightly based on the comic strips, the protagonist is assisted by Rippers – mutant kangaroo genetically engineered supersoldiers (and Booga is among them, of course).

Rocko the wallaby in Rocko's Modern Life.

Dot and the Kangaroo was a cartoon juxtaposed on a film of the Australian bush.

In The Simpsons episode "Bart vs. Australia", Homer and Bart try to escape from a crowd in the pouches of two kangaroos, but fail because the kangaroos' pouches are filled with mucus.

In Adventures of Sonic the Hedgehog, there is a kangaroo named MacHopper, who is also a parody of Crocodile Dundee, another Australian icon.

In the Kick Buttowski: Suburban Daredevil episode "Bwar and Peace", Brad talks about his Australian self, who afterward was punched, and the kangaroo appears before and during his wedding with the girl he is with. Kick also interacted with the kangaroo.

In the fifth season of The Flintstones, the Rubbles adopt Hoppy, a pet hoparoo (a Stone Age version of a kangaroo) from Down Under, for Bamm-Bamm.

=== Advertisements ===
Aussie hair products from Procter & Gamble sports a kangaroo hopping on its label, while the magazine and television ads display an animatronic purple kangaroo in them.

Dunkaroos are a snack in the U.S. which used to feature a talking kangaroo in commercials and on product containers.

=== Video games and other games ===
Sierra Championship Boxing includes real life boxers but also boxing kangaroos.

Roo is a fighting kangaroo in the Sega Genesis video game Streets of Rage 3.

Ripper Roo, a crazy kangaroo in a straitjacket, is a boss character and antagonist of the video game series Crash Bandicoot.

Kao the Kangaroo and its sequels are a Polish video game series involving a yellow/orange kangaroo in a boxing uniform as its protagonist.

Sheila, a female kangaroo of the video game series Spyro the Dragon.

Roger the boxing kangaroo from the Tekken series of video games.

In the Game Boy Color games The Legend of Zelda: Oracle of Seasons and The Legend of Zelda: Oracle of Ages, there is a kangaroo by the name of Ricky who aids Link.

In Mortal Kombat Trilogy, Johnny Cage turns into a kangaroo.

In the Bomberman games, the animals which hatch from eggs are called Rooi and they are based on kangaroos.

The Animal Crossing series features kangaroos as possible neighbours.

There are at least three homonymous fairy chess pieces called kangaroo.

=== Others ===
Austin of The Backyardigans is a young kangaroo.

In Warriors of Virtue, the five main heroes are kangaroos.

In the Pokémon franchise, Kangaskhan is a Normal type based on a kangaroo with reptilian features. Breloom, a Grass and Fighting type, is also partly based on a kangaroo with mushroom and boxing features.

In the anime and manga series Reborn! the character Ryohei Sasagawa has a kangaroo in one of his ring boxes that enables healing and advances abilities of others.

Chimera Punch, a kangaroolike monster in Tokyo Mew Mew.

Mid 19th-century American humorist Artemus Ward (Charles Farrar Browne) frequently featured a kangaroo (often spelled "cangeroo" in his comic dialect) as part of his fictional travelling menagerie across both his written stories and stage appearances. Newspaper anecdotes, including in Australia, falsely claimed Ward had a live pet kangaroo and that he gifted it to his Cleveland Plain Dealer colleague George Hoyt in 1866.

== Kangaroos and sporting teams ==
The kangaroo features prominently in sport. Australian sports teams with macropod nicknames (with wallaby and wallaroo) include the following:

=== Australia ===
The tradition of using macropod emblems in Australian sport dates back to 1870, when Sydney's rugby club Wallaroo FC adopted the wallaroo as its name and emblem. While the use of kangaroo and wallaby monikers in team sport was not taken up until the 20th century, the Wallaroo name became popular across New South Wales and Queensland, inspiring a score of namesake clubs.

==== Australian national teams ====
The Australian national rugby league team is nicknamed the Kangaroos.

The Australia national rugby union team is nicknamed the Wallabies.

The Australia national association football team (men's) is nicknamed the Socceroos.

The Australia national under-23 football team plays Football at the Summer Olympics and is nicknamed Olyroos.

The Australia national under-20 football team is nicknamed the Young Socceroos

The Australia national under-17 football team is the Joeys

The Australian women's national rugby union team is nicknamed the Wallaroos.

The Australian Women's field hockey team is nicknamed the Hockeyroos.

The Australian national ice hockey team is nicknamed the Mighty Roos.

The Australian men's national basketball team is nicknamed the Boomers.

==== Australian domestic teams ====
The North Melbourne Football Club in the Australian Football League is nicknamed the Kangaroos.

Perth Kangaroos IFC

=== United States ===
Kasey Kangaroo is the mascot for the University of Missouri–Kansas City, whose sports teams were historically known as the UMKC Kangaroos but rebranded as the Kansas City Roos in 2019.

Zippy the kangaroo is the mascot for The University of Akron, athletically the Akron Zips.

The kangaroo is the mascot for Austin College in Sherman, Texas

The kangaroo is the mascot for Terryville High School in Terryville, Connecticut

Lizzie (a purple and white kangaroo) is the mascot of Lake Washington High School in Kirkland, Washington

Stomper is the mascot for the professional wrestling promotion Impact Wrestling.

Roody the Kangaroo is the mascot for SUNY Canton in Canton (town), New York.

The kangaroo is the mascot for Wilmington Friends School in Wilmington, Delaware

Moe the Kangaroo is the mascot for Virginia Military Institute in Lexington, Virginia. However, VMI's sports teams are known as the VMI Keydets.

Nashville Kangaroos

The kangaroo is the mascot for Killeen High School in Killeen, Texas.

Weatherford, Texas High School's mascot is the Kangaroos

Abington Friends School, in Abington, Pennsylvania, has a kangaroo named Roo as its mascot.

=== Other countries ===
The Samoa national Australian rules football team is nicknamed the Kangaroos.

The FC Bohemians Praha, a Czech football team is nicknamed the Klokani (Czech for kangaroos) since their tour in Australia in 1927.

Etobicoke Kangaroos

Vienna Kangaroos

== Place names ==
The kangaroo has inspired a number of place names in Australia. They include:

New South Wales

- Kangaroo Point
- Kangaroo Point – (Brooklyn)
- Kangaroo River – (Clarence Valley)
- Kangaroo River – (Shoalhaven)
- Kangaroo Valley

Queensland

- Kangaroo Island
- Kangaroo Point
- Kangaroo Point Cliffs
- Kangaroo River

South Australia

- Kangaroo Creek Reservoir
- Kangaroo Flat
- Kangaroo Island

Tasmania

- East Kangaroo Island
- Kangaroo Island

Victoria

- Kangaroo Flat
- Kangaroo Ground

Western Australia

- Kangaroo Island
