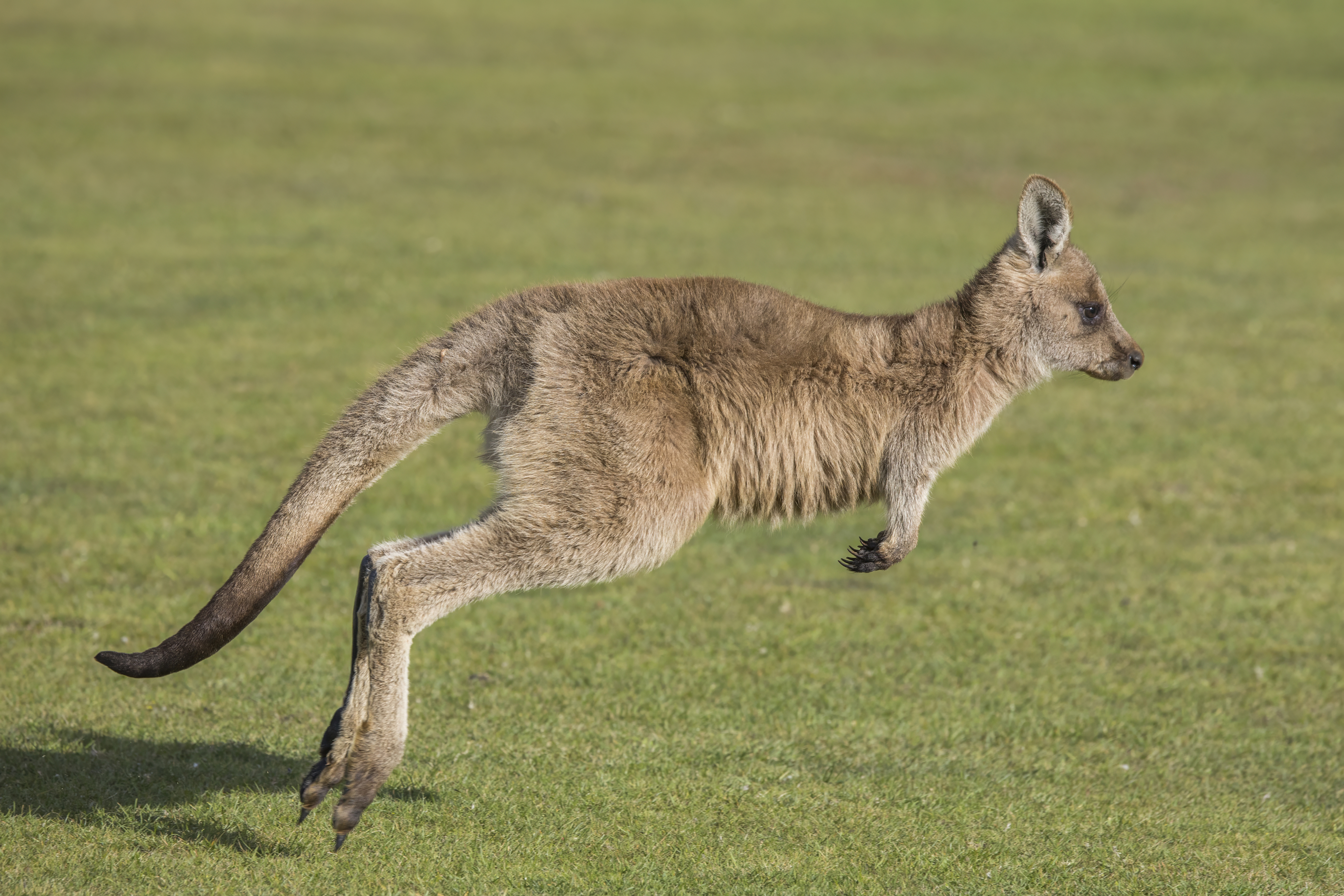
- A young eastern grey kangaroo in Tasmania

Scientific classification
- Kingdom: Animalia
- Phylum: Chordata
- Class: Mammalia
- Infraclass: Marsupialia
- Order: Diprotodontia
- Family: Macropodidae
- Subfamily: Macropodinae

Groups included
- Dendrolagus; Macropus; Osphranter antilopinus; Osphranter rufus

Cladistically included but traditionally excluded taxa
- All other Macropodinae sp.

= Kangaroo =

Kangaroos Temporal range: Early Miocene – Present

Marsupial of the family Macropodidae

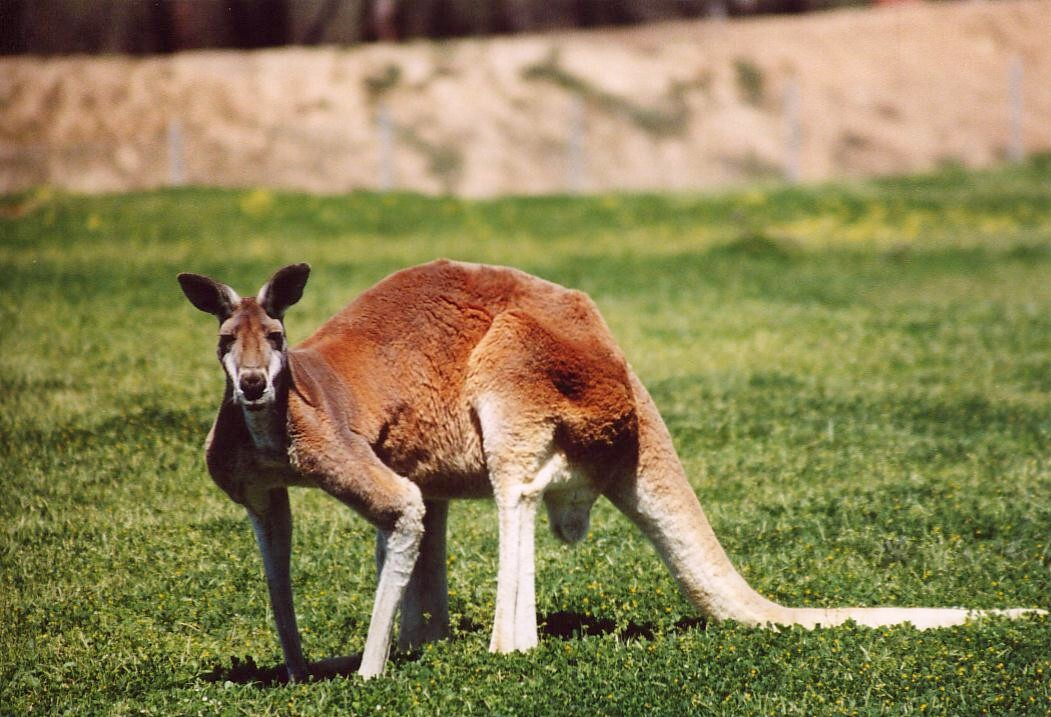
A male red kangaroo

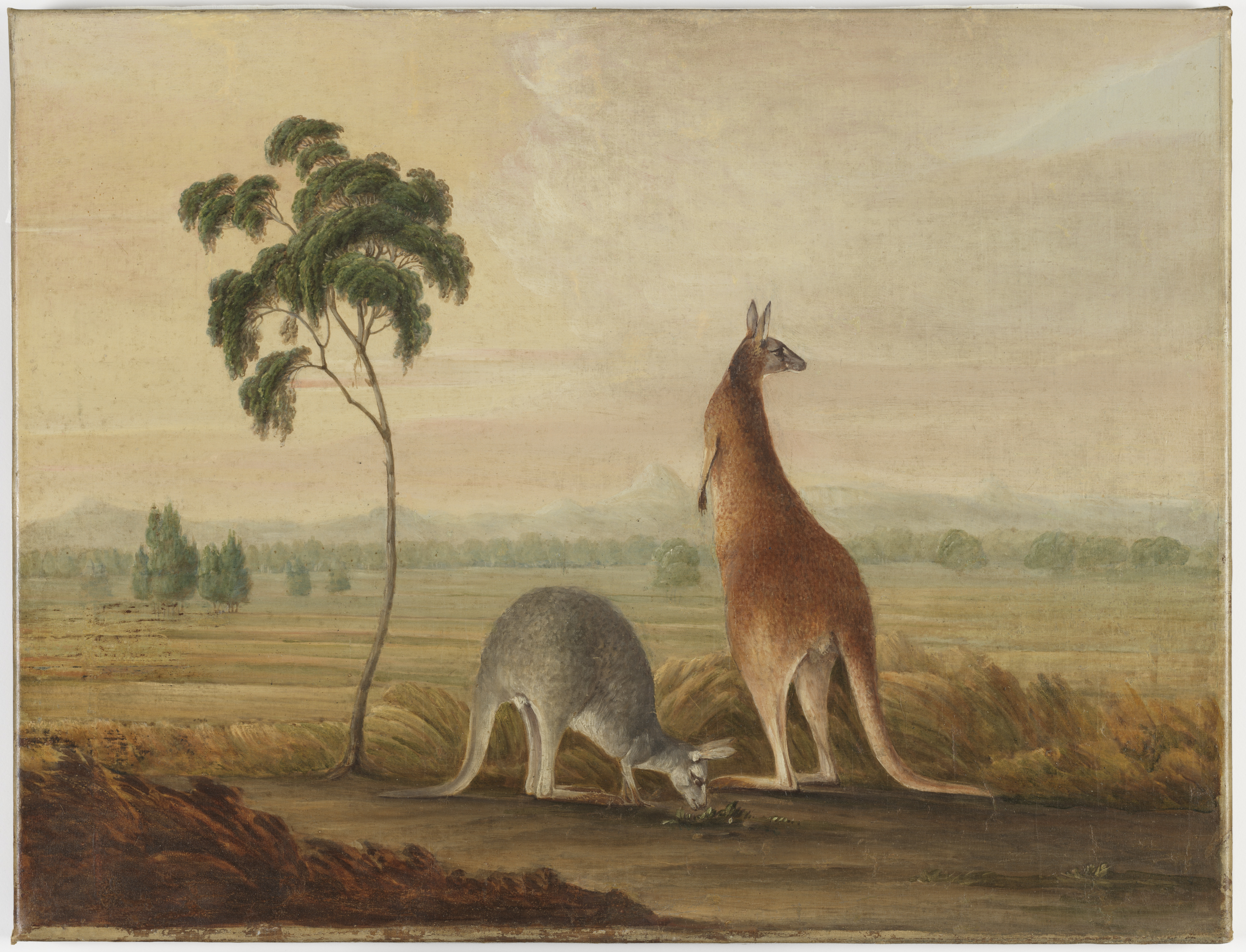
Red kangaroos, Liverpool Plains, Sydney, c. 1819

Kangaroos are marsupials from the subfamily Macropodinae (macropods, meaning "large foot"). In common use, the term is used to describe the largest species from this family, the red kangaroo, as well as the antilopine kangaroo, eastern grey kangaroo, and western grey kangaroo. Kangaroos are indigenous to Australia and New Guinea. The Australian government estimated that 42.8 million kangaroos lived within the commercial harvest areas of Australia in 2019, down from 53.2 million in 2013.

As with the terms "wallaroo" and "wallaby", "kangaroo" refers to a paraphyletic grouping of species. All three terms refer to members of the same taxonomic family, Macropodidae, and are distinguished according to size. The largest species in the family are called "kangaroos" and the smallest are generally called "wallabies". The term "wallaroos" refers to species of an intermediate size. There are also the tree-kangaroos, another type of macropod which inhabit the upper branches of trees in the tropical rainforests of New Guinea, far northeastern Queensland, and some of the islands in the region. A general idea of the relative size of these informal terms could be:

- wallabies: head and body length of 45–105 cm (18–41 in) and tail length of 33–75 cm (13–30 in); the dwarf wallaby (the smallest of all known macropod species) is 46 cm (18 in) long and weighs 1.6 kg (3.5 lb);
- wallaroos: the black wallaroo (the smaller of the two species) with a tail length of 60–70 cm (24–28 in) and weight of 19–22 kg (42–49 lb) for males and 13 kg (29 lb) for females;
- kangaroos: a large male can be 2 metres (6 feet 7 inches) tall and weigh 90 kg (200 lb).
  - tree-kangaroos: ranging from Lumholtz's tree-kangaroo: body and head length of 48–65 cm (19–26 in), tail of 60–74 cm (24–29 in), weight of 7.2 kg (16 lb) for males and 5.9 kg (13 lb) for females; to the grizzled tree-kangaroo: length of 75–90 cm (29.5–35.5 in) and weight of 8–15 kg (18–33 lb);

Kangaroos have large, powerful hind legs, large feet adapted for leaping, a long muscular tail for balance, and a small head. Like most marsupials, female kangaroos have a pouch called a marsupium in which joeys complete postnatal development.

Because of its grazing habits, the kangaroo has developed specialized teeth that are rare among mammals. Its incisors are able to crop grass close to the ground and its molars chop and grind the grass. Since the two sides of the lower jaw are not joined or fused together, the lower incisors are farther apart, giving the kangaroo a wider bite. The silica in grass is abrasive, so kangaroo molars are ground down and they actually move forward in the mouth before they eventually fall out, and are replaced by new teeth that grow in the back. This process is known as polyphyodonty and, amongst other mammals, only occurs in elephants and manatees.

The large kangaroos have adapted much better than the smaller macropods to land clearing for pastoral agriculture and habitat changes brought to the Australian landscape by humans. Many of the smaller species are rare and endangered, while kangaroos are relatively plentiful, despite a common misconception to the contrary.

The kangaroo, along with the koala, are symbols of Australia. A kangaroo appears on the Australian coat of arms and on some of its currency, and is used as a logo for some of Australia's most well-known organisations, such as Qantas, and as the roundel of the Royal Australian Air Force. The kangaroo is important to both Australian culture and the national image, and consequently there are numerous popular culture references.

Wild kangaroos are shot for meat, leather hides, and to protect grazing land. Kangaroo meat has perceived health benefits for human consumption compared with traditional meats due to the low level of fat on kangaroos.

== Terminology ==
The word kangaroo derives from the Guugu Yimithirr word gangurru, referring to eastern grey kangaroos. The name was first recorded as "kanguru" on 12 July 1770 in an entry in the diary of Sir Joseph Banks; this occurred at the site of modern Cooktown, on the banks of the Endeavour River, where HMS Endeavour under the command of Lieutenant James Cook was beached for almost seven weeks to repair damage sustained on the Great Barrier Reef. Cook first referred to kangaroos in his diary entry of 4 August. Guugu Yimithirr is the language of the people of the area.

A common myth about the kangaroo's English name is that it was a Guugu Yimithirr phrase for "I don't know" or "I don't understand". According to this legend, Cook and Banks were exploring the area when they happened upon the animal. They asked a nearby local what the creatures were called. The local responded "kangaroo", said to mean "I don't know/understand", which Cook then took to be the name of the creature. Anthropologist Walter Roth was trying to correct this legend as far back as in 1898, but few took note until 1972 when linguist John B. Haviland in his research with the Guugu Yimithirr people was able to confirm that gangurru referred to a rare large dark-coloured species of kangaroo. However, when Phillip Parker King visited the Endeavour River region in 1819 and 1820, he maintained that the local word was not kangaroo but menuah perhaps referring to a different species of macropod. There are similar, more credible stories of naming confusion, such as with the Yucatán Peninsula.

Kangaroos are often colloquially referred to as "roos". Male kangaroos are called bucks, boomers, jacks, or old men; females are does, flyers, or jills; and the young ones are joeys. The collective noun for a group of kangaroos is a mob, court, or troupe.

== Taxonomy and description ==
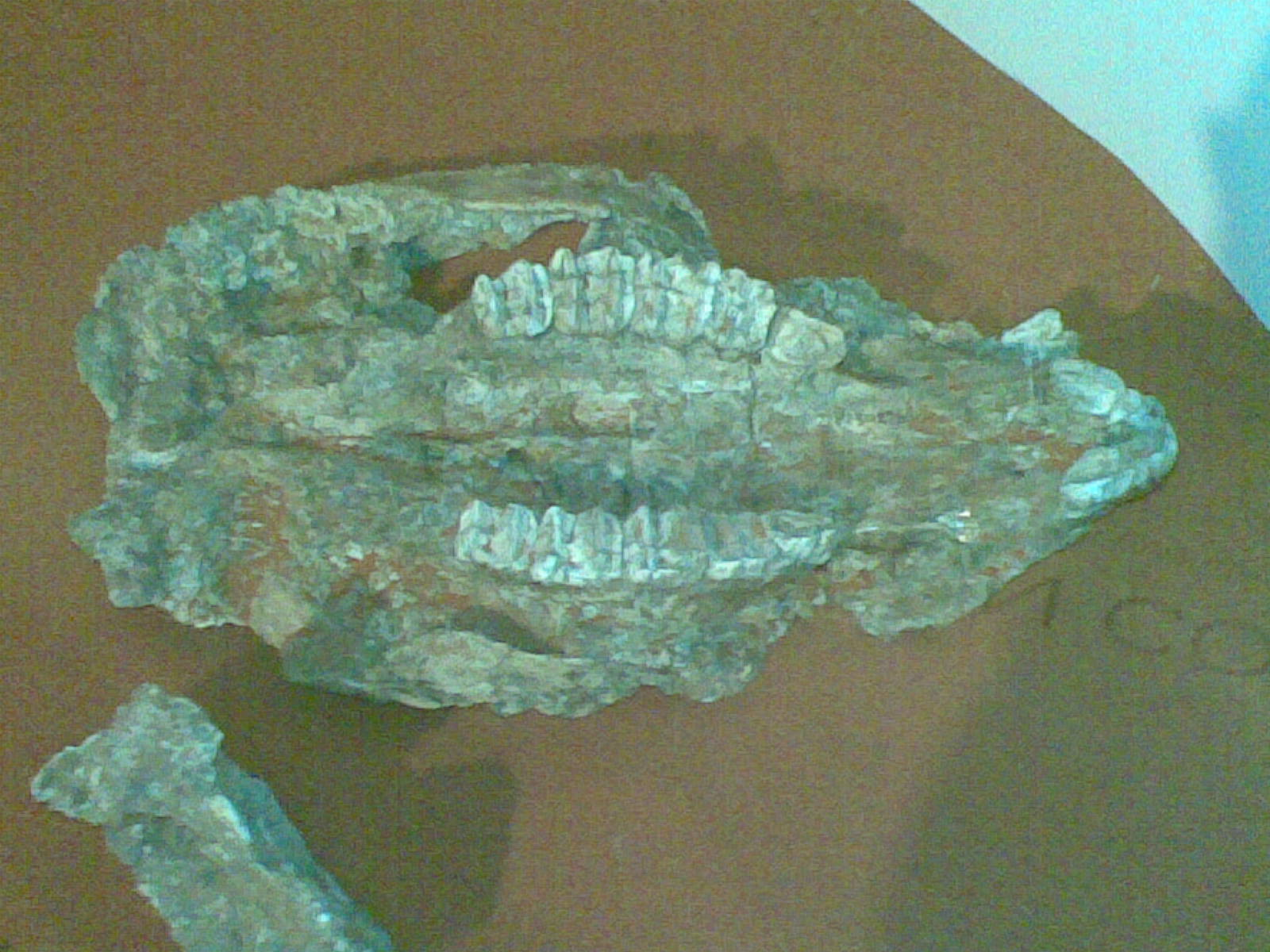
The palatal view of a Sthenurus sp. skull

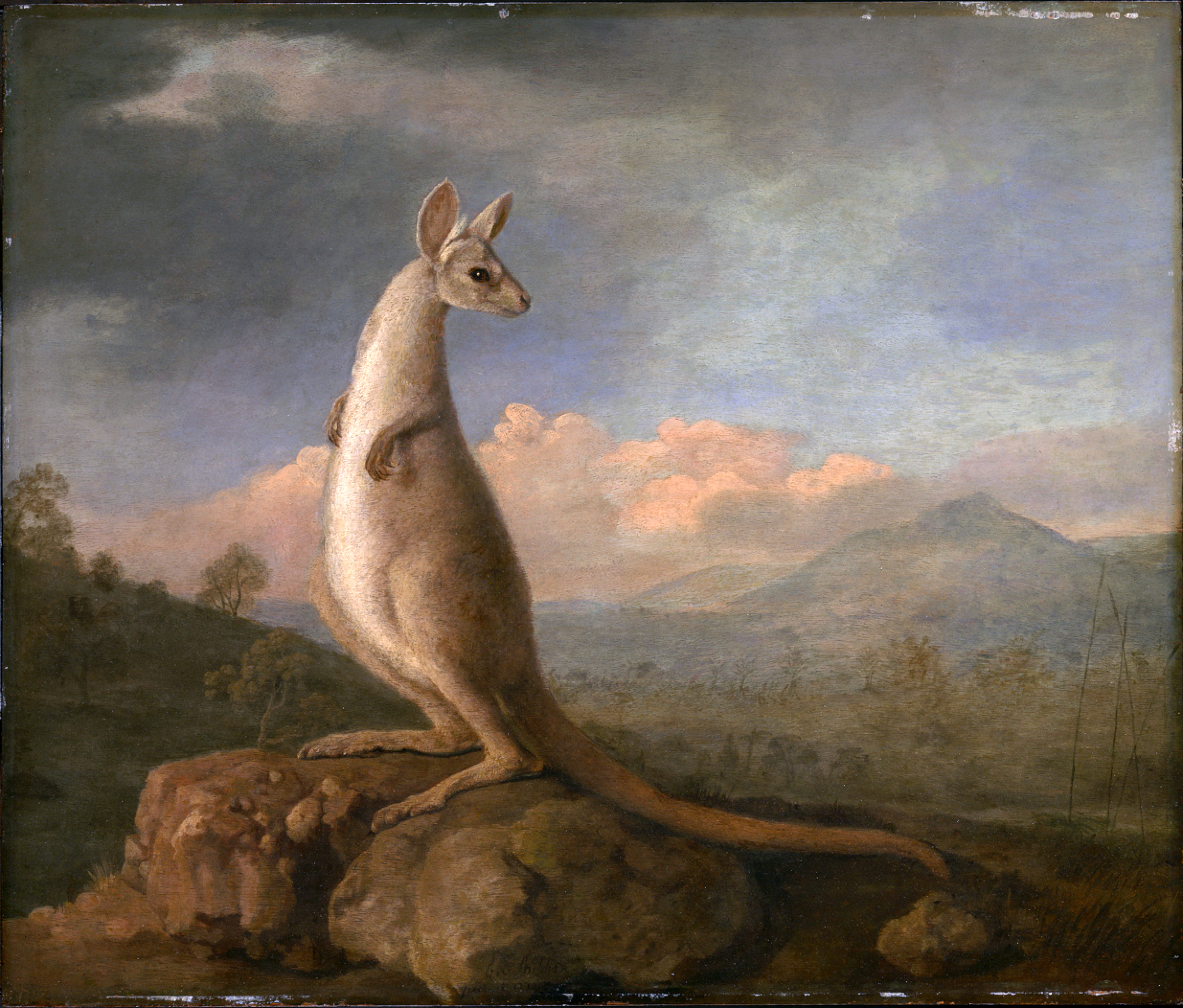
The Kongouro from New Holland, a 1772 painting of a kangaroo by George Stubbs

There are four extant species that are commonly referred to as kangaroos:

- The red kangaroo (Osphranter rufus) is the largest surviving marsupial anywhere in the world. It occupies the arid and semi-arid centre of the country. The highest population densities of the red kangaroo occur in the rangelands of western New South Wales. Red kangaroos are commonly mistaken as the most abundant species of kangaroo, but eastern greys actually have a larger population. A large male can be 2 metres (6 feet 7 inches) tall and weigh 90 kg (200 lb).
- The eastern grey kangaroo (Macropus giganteus) is less well-known than the red (outside Australia), but the most often seen, as its range covers the fertile eastern part of the country. The range of the eastern grey kangaroo extends from the top of the Cape York Peninsula in northern Queensland down to Victoria, as well as areas of southeastern Australia and Tasmania. Population densities of eastern grey kangaroos usually peak near 100 per km^{2} in suitable habitats of open woodlands. Populations are more limited in areas of land clearance, such as farmland, where forest and woodland habitats are limited in size or abundance.
- The western grey kangaroo (Macropus fuliginosus) is slightly smaller again at about 54 kg (119 lb) for a large male. It is found in the southern part of Western Australia, South Australia near the coast, and the Murray–Darling basin. The highest population densities occur in the western Riverina district of New South Wales and in the western areas of the Nullarbor Plain in Western Australia. Populations may have declined, particularly in agricultural areas. The species has a high tolerance to the plant toxin sodium fluoroacetate, which indicates a possible origin from the southwest region of Australia.
- The antilopine kangaroo (Osphranter antilopinus) is, essentially, the far northern equivalent of the eastern grey and western grey kangaroos. It is sometimes referred to as the antilopine wallaroo, but in behaviour and habitat it is more similar to the red, eastern grey and western grey kangaroos. Like them, it is a creature of the grassy plains and woodlands, and gregarious. Its name comes from its fur, which is similar in colour and texture to that of antelopes. Characteristically, the noses of males swell behind the nostrils. This enlarges nasal passages and allows them to release more heat in hot and humid climates.

In addition, there are about 50 smaller macropods closely related to the kangaroos in the family Macropodidae. Kangaroos and other macropods share a common ancestor with the Phalangeridae from the Middle Miocene. This ancestor was likely arboreal and lived in the canopies of the extensive forests that covered most of Australia at that time, when the climate was much wetter, and fed on leaves and stems. From the Late Miocene through the Pliocene and into the Pleistocene the climate got drier, which led to a decline of forests and expansion of grasslands. At this time, there was a radiation of macropodids characterised by enlarged body size and adaptation to the low quality grass diet with the development of foregut fermentation. The most numerous early macropods, the Balbaridae and the Bulungamayinae, became extinct in the Late Miocene around 5–10 mya. There is dispute over the relationships of the two groups to modern kangaroos and rat-kangaroos. Some argue that the balbarines were the ancestors of rat-kangaroos and the bulungamayines were the ancestors of kangaroos. while others hold the contrary view.

The middle to late bulungamayines, Ganguroo and Wanburoo lacked digit 1 of the hind foot and digits 2 and 3 were reduced and partly under the large digit 4, much like the modern kangaroo foot. This would indicate that they were bipedal. In addition, their ankle bones had an articulation that would have prohibited much lateral movements, an adaptation for bipedal hopping. Species related to the modern grey kangaroos and wallaroos begin to appear in the Pliocene. The red kangaroo appears to be the most recently evolved kangaroo, with its fossil record not going back beyond the Pleistocene era, 1–2 mya.

The first kangaroo to be exhibited in the Western world was an example shot by John Gore, an officer on Captain Cook's ship, HMS Endeavour, in 1770. The animal was shot and its skin and skull transported back to England whereupon it was stuffed (by taxidermists who had never seen the animal before) and displayed to the general public as a curiosity. The first glimpse of a kangaroo for many 18th-century Britons was a painting by George Stubbs.

=== Comparison with wallabies ===
Kangaroos and wallabies belong to the same taxonomic family (Macropodidae) and often the same genera, but kangaroos are specifically categorised into the four largest species of the family. The term wallaby is an informal designation generally used for any macropod that is smaller than a kangaroo or a wallaroo that has not been designated otherwise.

== Biology and behaviour ==
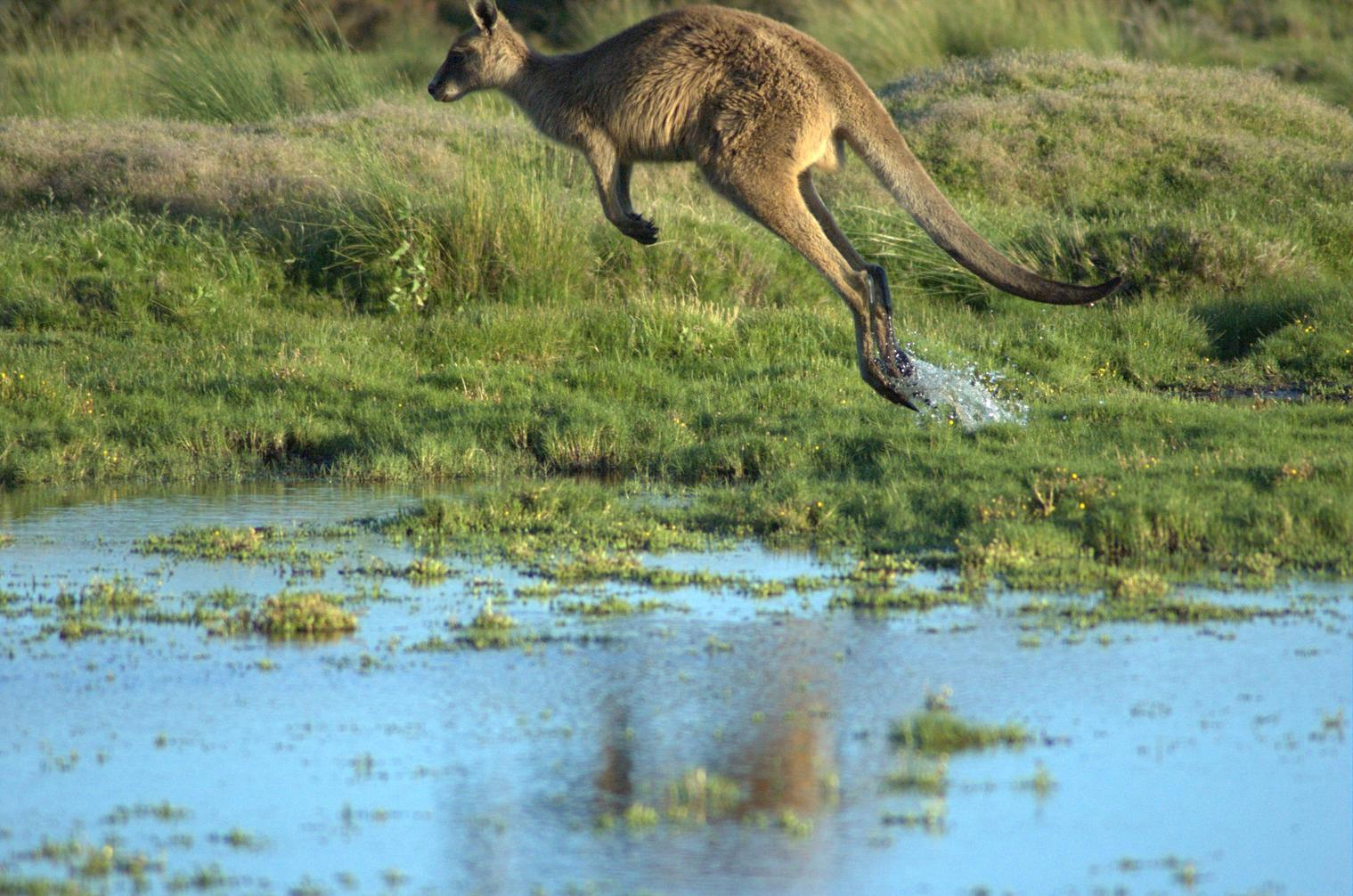
A Tasmanian eastern grey kangaroo in motion

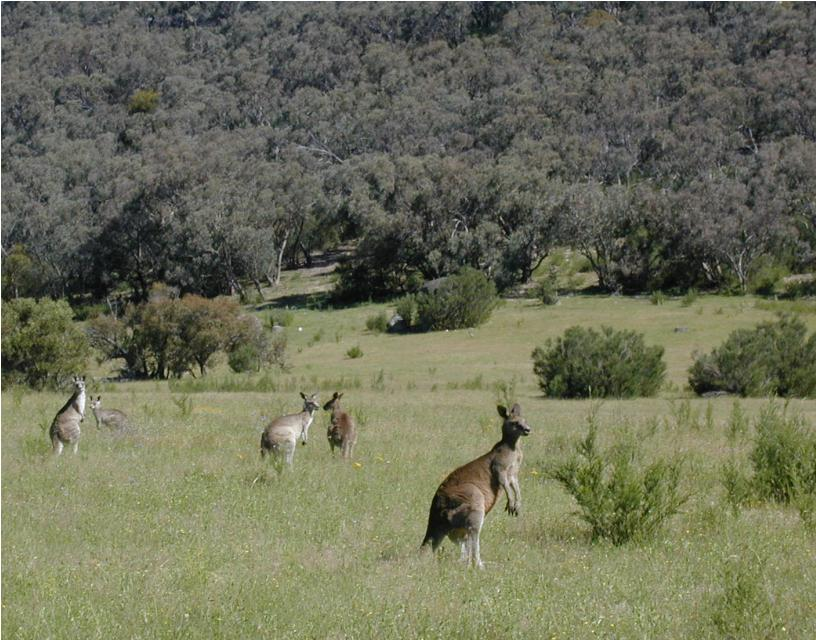
Kangaroos in their native grassland habitat

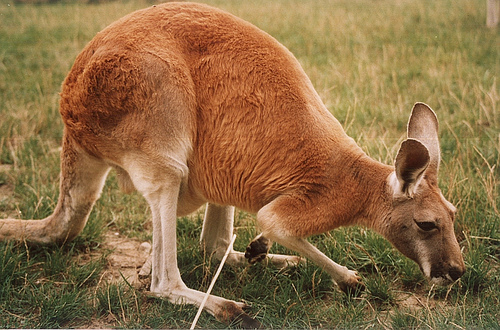
A red kangaroo grazing

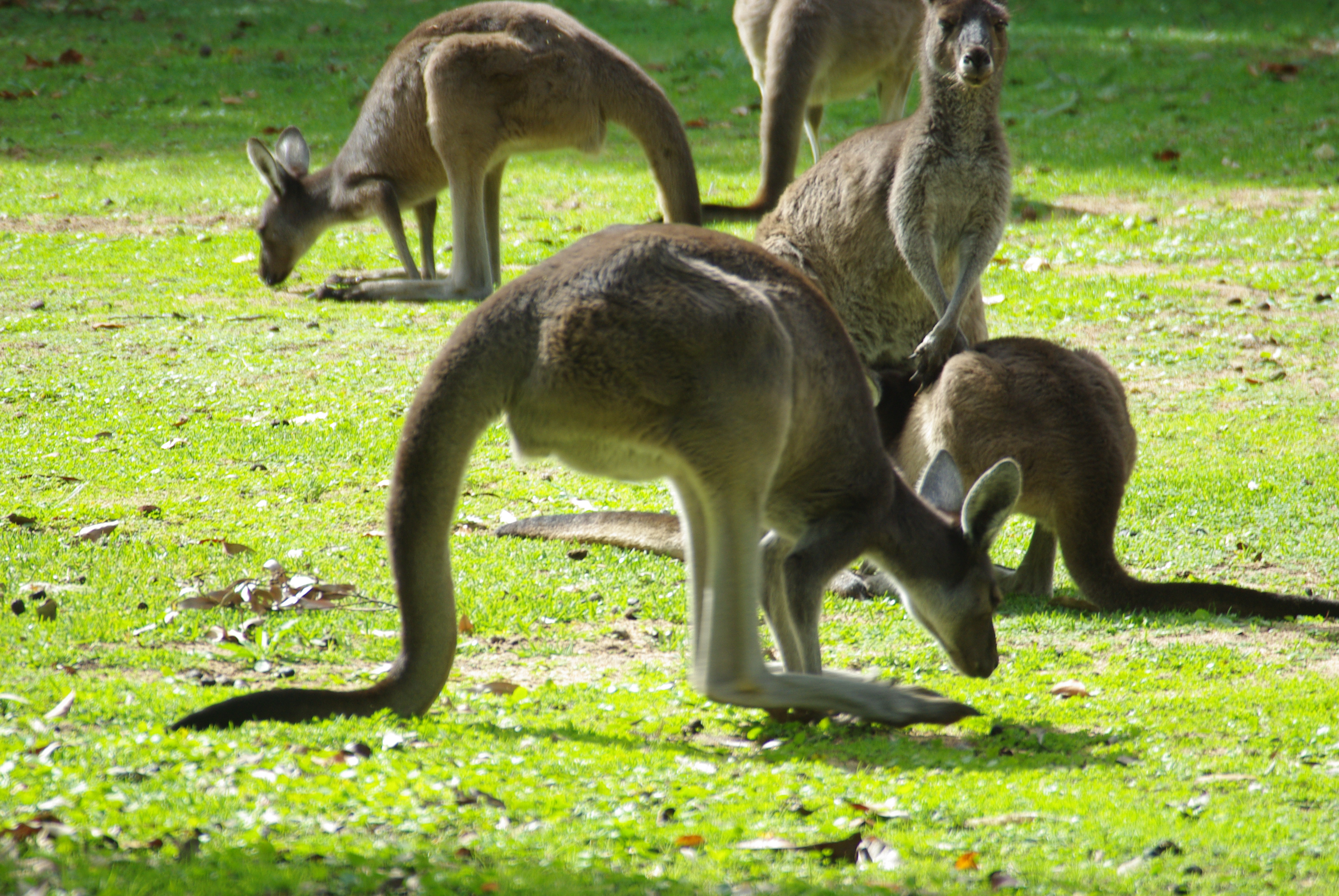
Western grey kangaroos

=== Locomotion ===
Kangaroos are the only large mammals to use hopping on two legs as their primary means of locomotion. The comfortable hopping speed for a red kangaroo is about 20–25 km/h (12–16 mph), but speeds of up to 70 km/h (43 mph) can be attained over short distances, while it can sustain a speed of 40 km/h (25 mph) for nearly 2 km (1.2 mi). During a hop, the powerful gastrocnemius muscles lift the body off the ground while the smaller plantaris muscle, which attaches near the large fourth toe, is used for push-off. Seventy percent of potential energy is stored in the elastic tendons. At slow speeds, it employs pentapedal locomotion, using its tail to form a tripod with its two forelimbs while bringing its hind feet forward. Both pentapedal walking and fast hopping are energetically costly. Hopping at moderate speeds is the most energy efficient, and a kangaroo moving above 15 km/h (9.3 mph) maintains energy consistency more than similarly sized animals running at the same speed.

Kangaroos can attain considerable height when jumping, according to Guinness the highest recorded jump for a red kangaroo is about 10 feet (3.0 m), whereas for the eastern grey kangaroo it is 8 feet (2.4 m).

=== Diet ===
Kangaroos have single-chambered stomachs quite unlike those of cattle and sheep, which have four compartments. They sometimes regurgitate the vegetation they have eaten, chew it as cud, and then swallow it again for final digestion. However, this is a different, more strenuous, activity than it is in ruminants, and does not take place as frequently.

Different species of kangaroos have different diets, although all are strict herbivores. The eastern grey kangaroo is predominantly a grazer, and eats a wide variety of grasses, whereas some other species such as the red kangaroo include significant amounts of shrubs in their diets. Smaller species of kangaroos also consume hypogeal fungi. Many species are nocturnal, and crepuscular, usually spending the hot days resting in shade, and the cool evenings, nights and mornings moving about and feeding.

==== Absence of digestive methane release ====
Despite having herbivorous diets similar to ruminants such as cattle, which release large quantities of digestive methane through exhaling and eructation (burping), kangaroos release virtually none. The hydrogen by-product of fermentation is instead converted into acetate, which is then used to provide further energy. Scientists are interested in the possibility of transferring the bacteria responsible for this process from kangaroos to cattle, since the greenhouse gas effect of livestock methane is a significant contributor to anthropogenic climate change.

=== Social and sexual behaviour ===
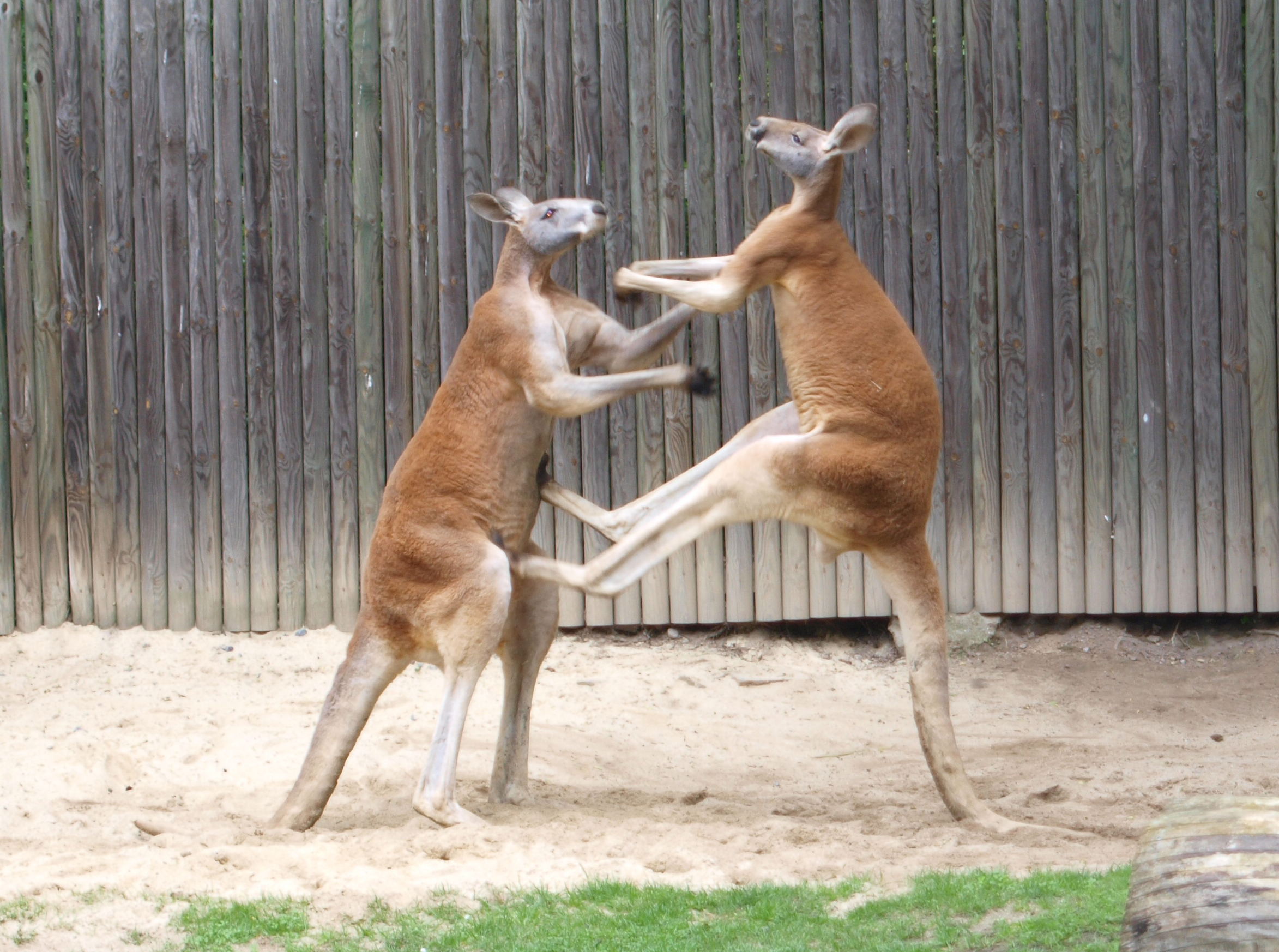
Two male red kangaroos boxing

Groups of kangaroos are called mobs, courts or troupes, which usually have 10 or more kangaroos in them. Living in mobs can provide protection for some of the weaker members of the group. The size and stability of mobs vary between geographic regions, with eastern Australia having larger and more stable aggregations than in arid areas farther west. Larger aggregations display high amounts of interactions and complex social structures, comparable to that of ungulates.

One common behaviour is nose touching and sniffing, which mostly occurs when an individual joins a group. The kangaroo performing the sniffing gains much information from smell cues. This behaviour enforces social cohesion without consequent aggression. In mutual sniffing, a smaller kangaroo may crouch and quiver its head as a sign of submission. Greetings between males and females are common, with larger males being the most involved in meeting females. Most other non-antagonistic behaviour occurs between mothers and their young. Mother and young reinforce their bond through grooming. A mother will groom her young while it is suckling or after it is finished suckling. A joey will nuzzle its mother's pouch if it wants access to it.

Sexual activity of kangaroos consists of consort pairs. Oestrous females roam widely and attract the attention of males with conspicuous signals. A male will monitor a female and follow her every movement. He sniffs her urine to see if she is in oestrus, a process exhibiting the flehmen response. The male will then proceed to approach her slowly to avoid alarming her. If the female does not run away, the male will continue by licking, pawing, and scratching her, and copulation will follow. After copulation is over, the male will move on to another female. Consort pairing may take several days and the copulation is also long. Thus, a consort pair is likely to attract the attention of a rival male. As larger males are tending bonds with females near oestrus, smaller males will tend to females that are farther from oestrus. Dominant males can avoid having to sort through females to determine their reproductive status by searching for tending bonds held by the largest male they can displace without a fight.

Fighting has been described in all species of kangaroos. Fights between kangaroos can be brief or long and ritualised. In highly competitive situations, such as males fighting for access to oestrous females or at limited drinking spots, the fights are brief. Both sexes will fight for drinking spots, but long, ritualised fighting or "boxing" is largely done by males. Smaller males fight more often near females in oestrus, while the large males in consorts do not seem to get involved. Ritualised fights can arise suddenly when males are grazing together. However, most fights are preceded by two males scratching and grooming each other. One or both of them will adopt a high standing posture, with one male issuing a challenge by grasping the other male's neck with its forepaw. Sometimes, the challenge will be declined. Large males often reject challenges by smaller males. During fighting, the combatants adopt a high standing posture and paw at each other's heads, shoulders and chests. They will also lock forearms and wrestle and push each other as well as balance on their tails to kick each other in the abdomen.

Brief fights are similar, except there is no forearm locking. The losing combatant seems to use kicking more often, perhaps to parry the thrusts of the eventual winner. A winner is decided when a kangaroo breaks off the fight and retreats. Winners are able to push their opponents backwards or down to the ground. They also seem to grasp their opponents when they break contact and push them away. The initiators of the fights are usually the winners. These fights may serve to establish dominance hierarchies among males, as winners of fights have been seen to displace their opponent from resting sites later in the day. Dominant males may also pull grass to intimidate subordinate ones.

=== Predators ===
Kangaroos have a few natural predators. The thylacine, considered by palaeontologists to have once been a major natural predator of the kangaroo, is now extinct. Other extinct predators included the marsupial lion, Megalania and Wonambi. However, with the arrival of humans in Australia at least 50,000 years ago and the introduction of the dingo about 5,000 years ago, kangaroos have had to adapt.

Along with dingoes, introduced species such as foxes, feral cats, and both domestic and feral dogs, pose a threat to kangaroo populations. Kangaroos and wallabies are adept swimmers, and often flee into waterways if presented with the option. If pursued into the water, a large kangaroo may use its forepaws to hold the predator underwater so as to drown it. Another defensive tactic described by witnesses is catching the attacking dog with the forepaws and disembowelling it with the hind legs.

=== Adaptations ===
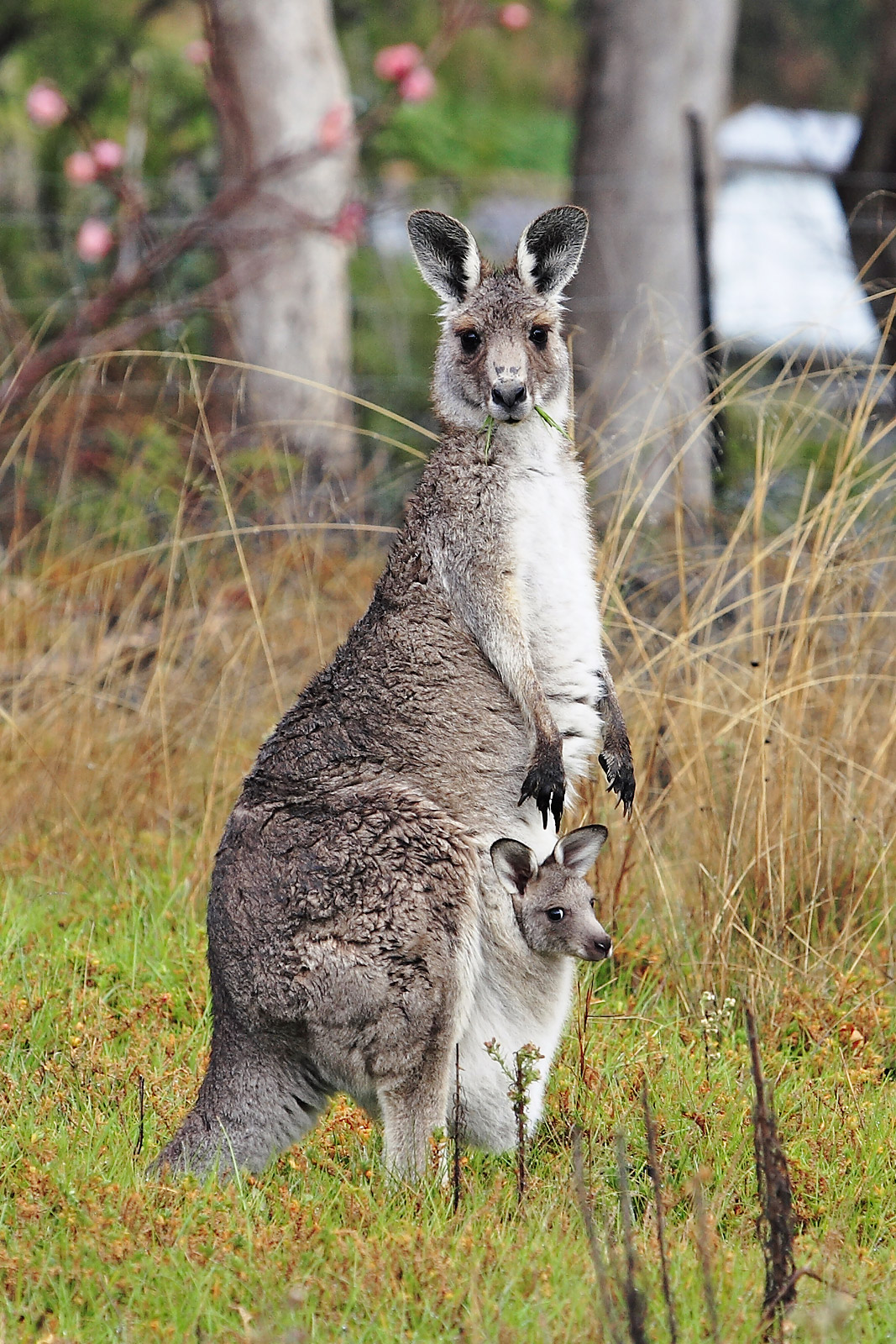
Kangaroo and joey in pouch

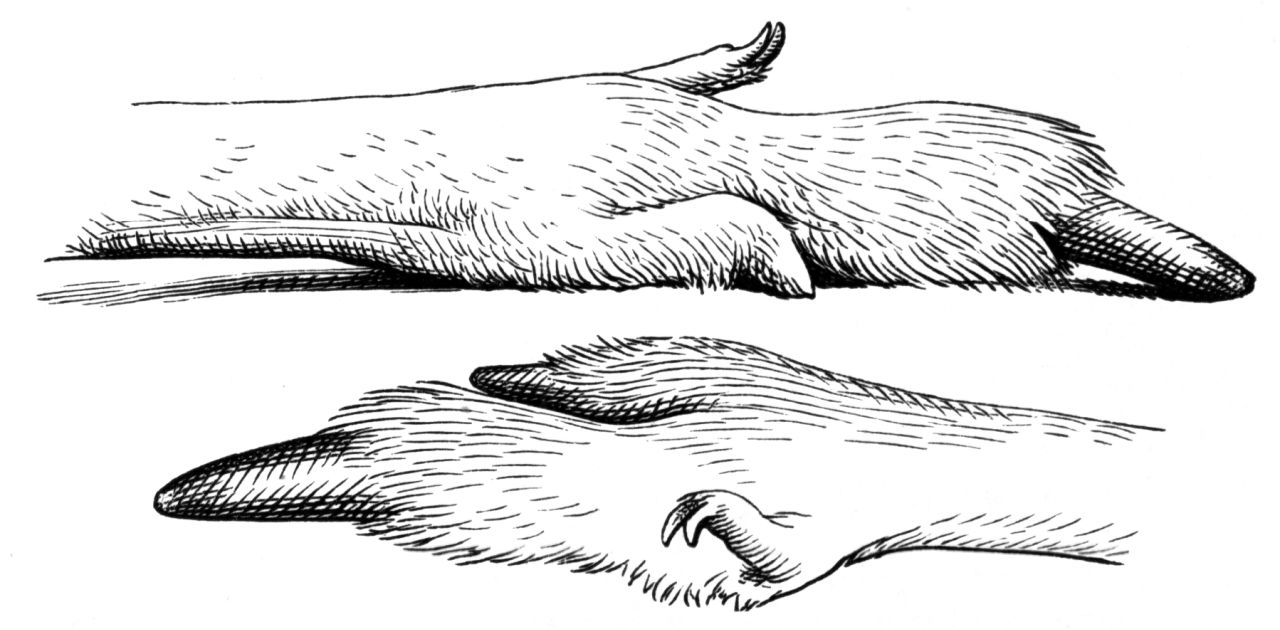
The hind leg of a kangaroo

Kangaroos have developed a number of adaptations to a dry, infertile country and highly variable climate. As with all marsupials, the young are born at a very early stage of development—after a gestation of 31–36 days. At this stage, only the forelimbs are somewhat developed, to allow the newborn to climb to the pouch and attach to a teat. In comparison, a human embryo at a similar stage of development would be at about 7 weeks gestation (even in a modern intensive care unit, premature babies born at less than 23 weeks gestation are usually not mature enough to survive). When the joey is born, it is about the size of a lima bean. The joey will usually stay in the pouch for about 9 months (180–320 days for the Western Grey) before starting to leave the pouch for small periods of time. It is usually fed by its mother until reaching 18 months.

The female kangaroo is usually pregnant in permanence, except on the day she gives birth; however, she has the ability to freeze the development of an embryo until the previous joey is able to leave the pouch. This is known as embryonic diapause and will occur in times of drought and in areas with poor food sources. The composition of the milk produced by the mother varies according to the needs of the joey. In addition, the mother is able to produce two different kinds of milk simultaneously for the new-born and the older joey still in the pouch.

Unusually, during a dry period, males will not produce sperm and females will conceive only if enough rain has fallen to produce a large quantity of green vegetation. The male has numerous sweat glands on the scrotum and a strong cremaster muscle that retracts the testes toward the body wall in order to regulate their temperature. The penis is retracted into a preputial sac which is everted through the cloaca.

Kangaroos and wallabies have large, elastic tendons in their hind legs. They store elastic strain energy in the tendons of their large hind legs, providing most of the energy required for each hop by the spring action of the tendons rather than by any muscular effort. This is true in all animal species which have muscles connected to their skeletons through elastic elements such as tendons, but the effect is more pronounced in kangaroos.

There is also a link between the hopping action and breathing: as the feet leave the ground, air is expelled from the lungs; bringing the feet forward ready for landing refills the lungs, providing further energy efficiency. Studies of kangaroos and wallabies have demonstrated, beyond the minimum energy expenditure required to hop at all, increased speed requires very little extra effort (much less than the same speed increase in, say, a horse, dog or human), and the extra energy is required to carry extra weight. For kangaroos, the key benefit of hopping is not speed to escape predators—the top speed of a kangaroo is no higher than that of a similarly sized quadruped, and the Australian native predators are in any case less fearsome than those of other countries—but economy: in an infertile country with highly variable weather patterns, the ability of a kangaroo to travel long distances at moderately high speed in search of food sources is crucial to survival.

New research has revealed that a kangaroo's tail acts as a third leg rather than just a balancing strut. Kangaroos have a unique three-stage walk where they plant their front legs and tail first, then push off their tail, followed lastly by the back legs. The propulsive force of the tail is equal to that of both the front and hind legs combined and performs as much work as what a human leg walking can at the same speed.

A DNA sequencing project of the genome of a member of the kangaroo family, the tammar wallaby, was started in 2004. It was a collaboration between Australia (mainly funded by the State of Victoria) and the National Institutes of Health in the US. The tammar's genome was fully sequenced in 2011. The genome of a marsupial such as the kangaroo is of great interest to scientists studying comparative genomics, because marsupials are at an ideal degree of evolutionary divergence from humans: mice are too close and have not developed many different functions, while birds are genetically too remote. The dairy industry could also benefit from this project.

=== Blindness ===
Eye disease is rare but not new among kangaroos. The first official report of kangaroo blindness took place in 1994, in central New South Wales. The following year, reports of blind kangaroos appeared in Victoria and South Australia. By 1996, the disease had spread "across the desert to Western Australia". Australian authorities were concerned the disease could spread to other livestock and possibly humans. Researchers at the Australian Animal Health Laboratories in Geelong detected a virus called the Wallal virus in two species of midges, believed to have been the carriers. Veterinarians also discovered fewer than 3% of kangaroos exposed to the virus developed blindness.

=== Reproduction and life cycle ===
A kangaroo in Australia

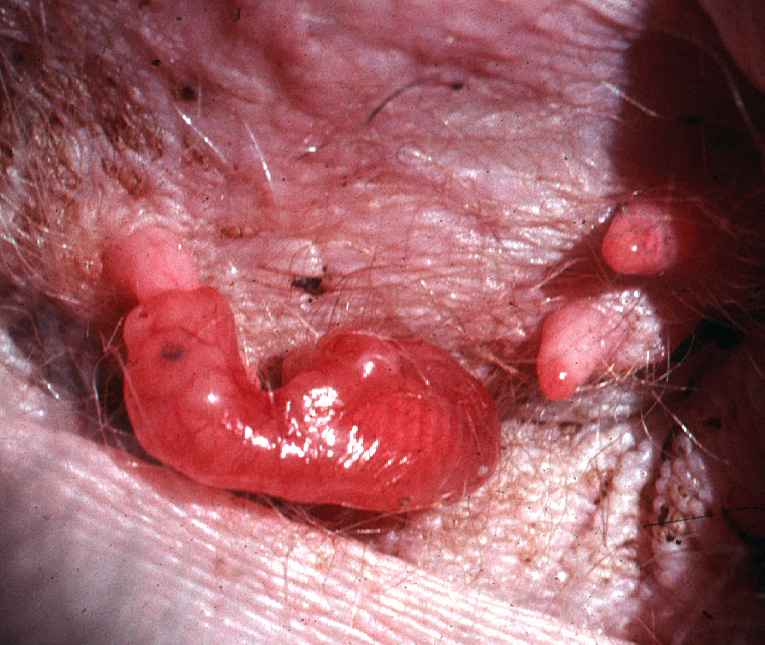
A newborn joey sucking on a teat in the pouch

Kangaroo reproduction is similar to that of opossums. The egg (still contained in the shell membrane, a few micrometres thick, and with only a small quantity of yolk within it) descends from the ovary into the uterus. There it is fertilised and quickly develops into a neonate. Even in the largest kangaroo species (the red kangaroo), the neonate emerges after only 33 days. Usually, only one young is born at a time. It is blind, hairless, and only a few centimetres long; its hindlegs are mere stumps; it instead uses its more developed forelegs to climb its way through the thick fur on its mother's abdomen into the pouch, which takes about three to five minutes. Once in the pouch, it fastens onto one of the four teats and starts to feed. Almost immediately, the mother's sexual cycle starts again. Another egg descends into the uterus and she becomes sexually receptive. Then, if she mates and a second egg is fertilised, its development is temporarily halted. This is known as embryonic diapause, and will occur in times of drought and in areas with poor food sources. Meanwhile, the neonate in the pouch grows rapidly. After about 190 days, the baby (joey) is sufficiently large and developed to make its full emergence out of the pouch, after sticking its head out for a few weeks until it eventually feels safe enough to fully emerge. From then on, it spends increasing time in the outside world and eventually, after about 235 days, it leaves the pouch for the last time. The lifespan of kangaroos averages at six years in the wild to in excess of 20 years in captivity, varying by the species. Most individuals, however, do not reach maturity in the wild.

== Interaction with humans ==
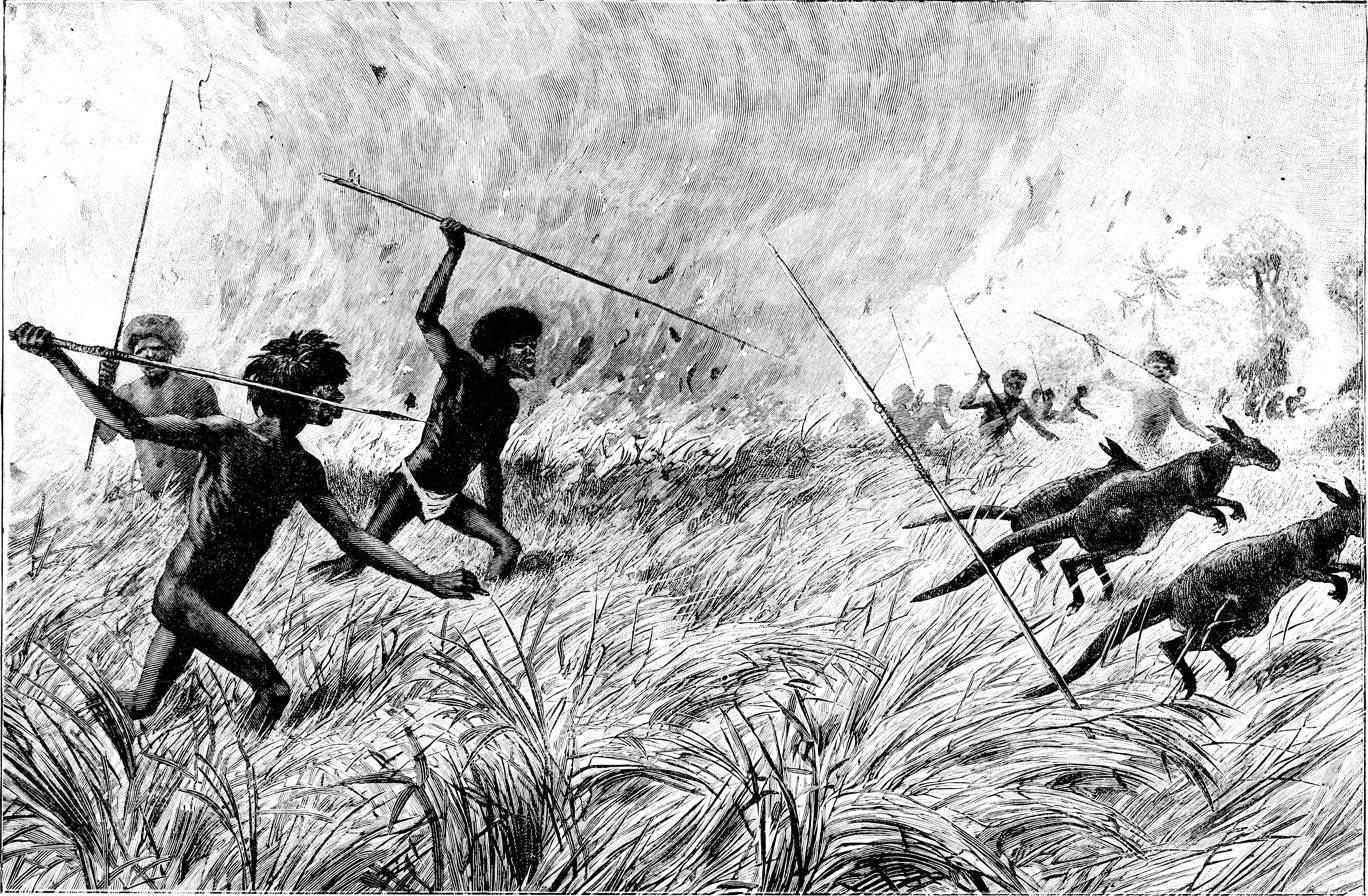
Aboriginal Australians hunting kangaroos

The kangaroo has always been a very important animal for Aboriginal Australians, for its meat, hide, bone, and tendon. Kangaroo hides were also sometimes used for recreation; in particular there are accounts of some tribes (Kurnai) using stuffed kangaroo scrotum as a ball for the traditional football game of marngrook. In addition, there were important Dreaming stories and ceremonies involving the kangaroo. Aherrenge is a current kangaroo dreaming site in the Northern Territory.

Unlike many of the smaller macropods, kangaroos have fared well since European settlement. European settlers cut down forests to create vast grasslands for sheep and cattle grazing, added stock watering points in arid areas, and have substantially reduced the number of dingoes. This overabundance has led to the view that the kangaroo is a pest animal as well as requiring regular culling and other forms of management. There is concern that the current management practices are leading to detrimental consequences for kangaroo welfare, landscape sustainability, biodiversity conservation, resilient agricultural production and Aboriginal health and culture.

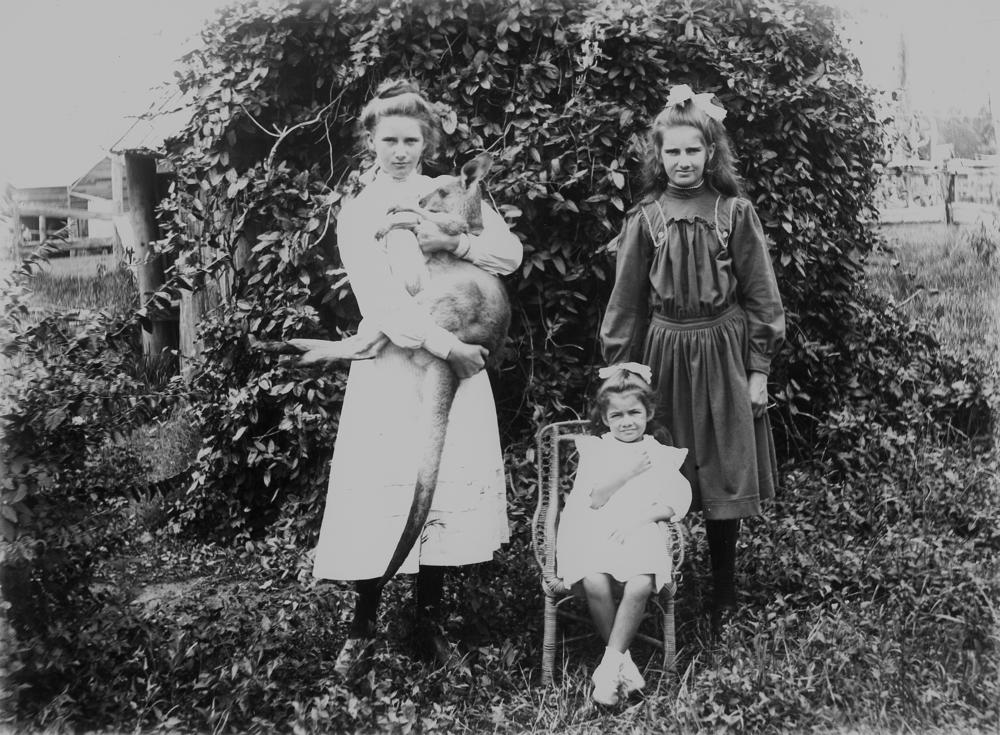
A kangaroo in a domestic setting, Queensland, Australia, circa 1900–1910

Kangaroos are shy and retiring by nature, and in normal circumstances present no threat to humans. In 2003, Lulu, an eastern grey which had been hand-reared, saved a farmer's life by alerting family members to his location when he was injured by a falling tree branch. She received the RSPCA Australia National Animal Valour Award on 19 May 2004.

There are very few records of kangaroos attacking humans without provocation; however, several such unprovoked attacks in 2004 spurred fears of a rabies-like disease possibly affecting the marsupials. Only two reliably documented cases of a fatality from a kangaroo attack have occurred in Australia. The first attack occurred in New South Wales in 1936 when a hunter was killed as he tried to rescue his two dogs from a heated fray. The second attack was inflicted on a 77-year-old man from a domesticated kangaroo in Redmond, Western Australia in September 2022. Other suggested causes for erratic and dangerous kangaroo behaviour include extreme thirst and hunger. In July 2011, a male red kangaroo attacked a 94-year-old woman in her own backyard as well as her son and two police officers responding to the situation. The kangaroo was capsicum sprayed (pepper sprayed) and later put down after the attack.

Kangaroos, even those that are not domesticated, were observed using their gaze to communicate with humans, alternately looking at researchers and at a box of food, similarly to domestic dogs.

=== Meat ===
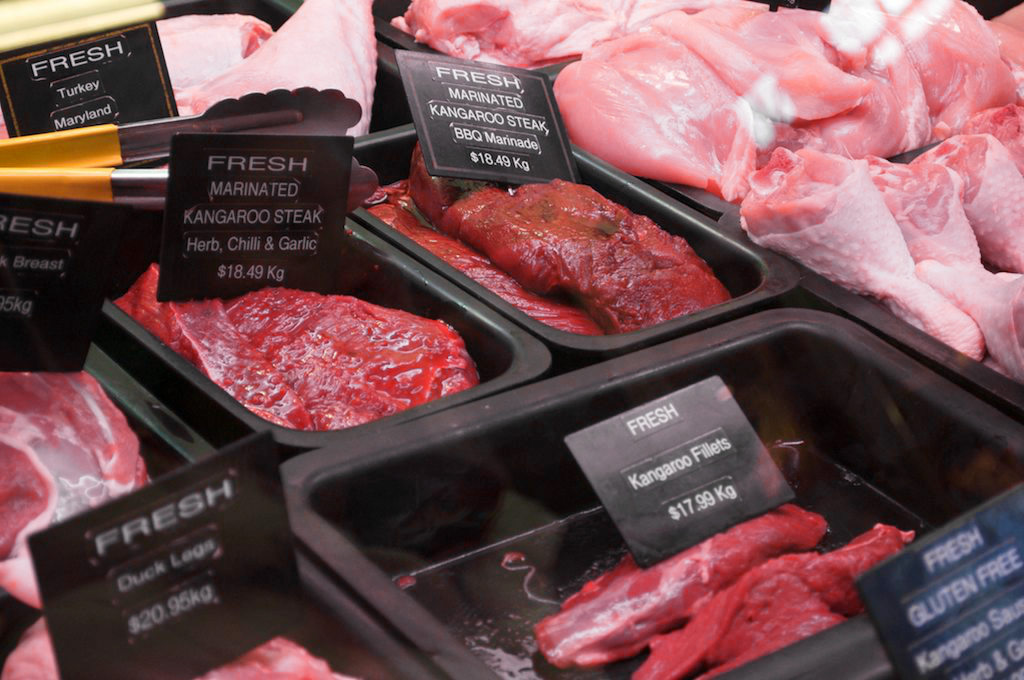
Kangaroo meat on sale in Melbourne

The kangaroo has been a source of food for indigenous Australians for tens of thousands of years. Kangaroo meat is high in protein and low in fat (about 2%). Kangaroo meat has a high concentration of conjugated linoleic acid (CLA) compared with other foods, and is a rich source of vitamins and minerals. Low fat diets rich in CLA have been studied for their potential in reducing obesity and atherosclerosis.

Kangaroo meat is sourced from wild animals and is seen by many as the best source of population control programs as opposed to culling them as pests where carcasses are left in paddocks. Kangaroos are harvested by licensed shooters in accordance with a code of practice and are protected by state and federal legislation.

Kangaroo meat is exported to many countries around the world. However, it is not considered biblically kosher by Jews or Adventists. It is considered halal according to Muslim dietary standards, because kangaroos are herbivorous.

=== Collisions with vehicles ===
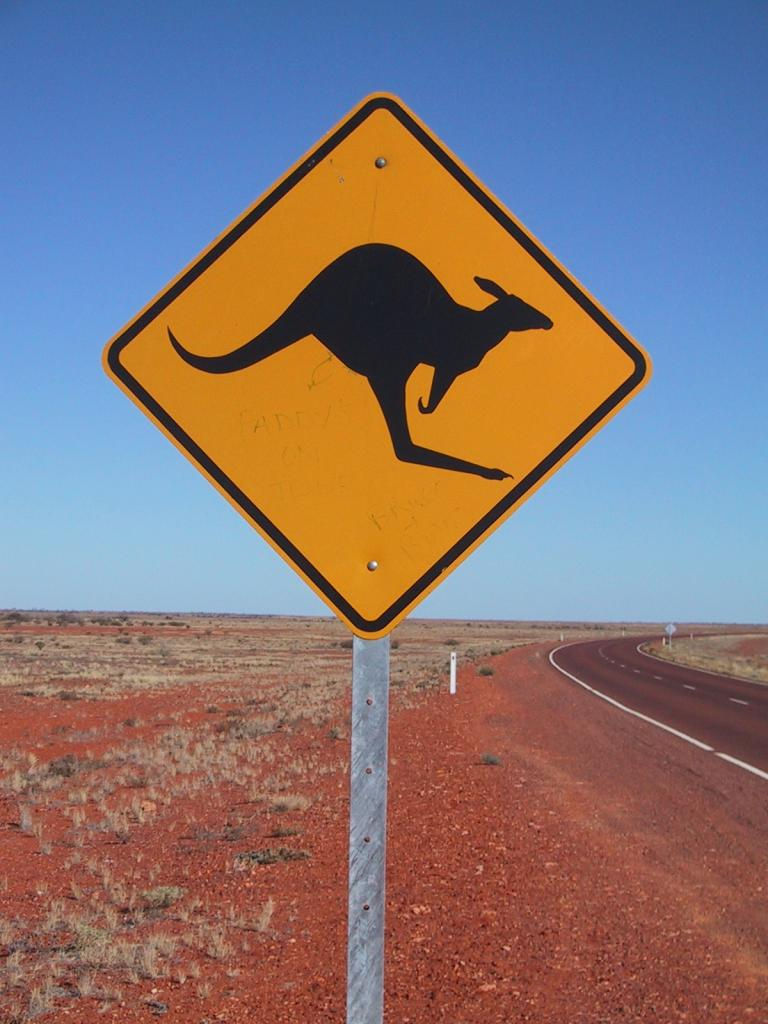
A "kangaroo crossing" sign on an Australian highway

Nine out of ten animal collisions in Australia involve kangaroos. A collision with a vehicle is capable of killing a kangaroo. Kangaroos dazzled by headlights or startled by engine noise often leap in front of cars. Since kangaroos in mid-bound can reach speeds of around 50 km/h (31 mph) and are relatively heavy, the force of impact can be severe. Small vehicles may be destroyed, while larger vehicles may suffer engine damage. The risk of harm or death to vehicle occupants is greatly increased if the windscreen is the point of impact. As a result, "kangaroo crossing" signs are commonplace in Australia.

Vehicles that frequent isolated roads, where roadside assistance may be scarce, are often fitted with "roo bars" to minimise damage caused by collision. Bonnet-mounted devices, designed to scare wildlife off the road with ultrasound and other methods, have been devised and marketed, but are ineffective.

If a female is the victim of a collision, animal welfare groups ask that her pouch be checked for any surviving joey, in which case it may be removed to a wildlife sanctuary or veterinary surgeon for rehabilitation. Likewise, when an adult kangaroo is injured in a collision, a vet, the RSPCA Australia or the National Parks and Wildlife Service can be consulted for instructions on proper care. In New South Wales, rehabilitation of kangaroos is carried out by volunteers from WIRES. Council road signs often list phone numbers for callers to report injured animals.

== Emblems and popular culture ==
A kangaroo and an emu feature on the Australian coat of arms

The kangaroo is a recognisable symbol of Australia. The kangaroo and emu feature on the Australian coat of arms. Kangaroos have also been featured on coins, most notably the five kangaroos on the Australian one dollar coin. The Australian Made logo consists of a golden kangaroo in a green triangle to show that a product is grown or made in Australia.

Registered trademarks of early Australian companies using the kangaroo included Yung, Schollenberger & Co. Walla Walla Brand leather and skins (1890); Arnold V. Henn (1892) whose emblem showed a family of kangaroos playing with a skipping rope; Robert Lascelles & Co. linked the speed of the animal with its velocipedes (1896); while some overseas manufacturers, like that of "The Kangaroo" safety matches (made in Japan) of the early 1900s, also adopted the symbol. Even today, Australia's national airline, Qantas, uses a bounding kangaroo for its logo.

The kangaroo appears in Rudyard Kipling's Just So Stories, "The Sing-Song of Old Man Kangaroo", while the kangaroo is chased by a dingo, he gives Nqong the Big God's advice, that his legs and tail grew longest before five o'clock.

The kangaroo and wallaby feature predominantly in Australian sports teams names and mascots. Examples include the Australian national rugby league team (the Kangaroos) and the Australian national rugby union team (the Wallabies). In a nation-wide competition held in 1978 for the XII Commonwealth Games by the Games Australia Foundation Limited in 1982, Hugh Edwards' design was chosen; a simplified form of six thick stripes arranged in pairs extending from along the edges of a triangular centre represent both the kangaroo in full flight, and a stylised "A" for Australia.

Kangaroos are well represented in films, television, books, toys and souvenirs around the world. Skippy the Bush Kangaroo was a popular 1960s Australian children's television series about a fictional pet kangaroo. Kangaroos are featured in the Rolf Harris song "Tie Me Kangaroo Down, Sport" and several Christmas carols.

== See also ==
- BionicKangaroo – biomimetic robot
- Boxing kangaroo – national symbol of Australia
- Kangaroo industry – industry sourced from kangaroos
