= Murad =

Name list

Murad or Mourad (Arabic: مراد) is an Arabic name. It is also common in Armenian, Azerbaijani, Bengali, Turkish, Persian, and Berber as a male given name or surname and is commonly used throughout the Muslim world and Middle East.

== Etymology ==
It is derived from the Arabic Semitic triliteral root رود (r-w-d). Its Arabic meaning can be translated roughly into wanted, desired, wished for, yearned for or goal.

== Given name ==
=== Ottoman sultans ===
- Murad I (1326–1389), often nicknamed Hüdavendigâr—from Persian: خداوندگار Khodāvandgār —"the devotee of God", the third sultan. Received the name Murad through a play on the Arabic word "murad", which means "wish" or "desire".
- Murad II (1404–1451), Ottoman sultan
- Murad III (1546–1595), Ottoman sultan
- Murad IV (1612–1640), Ottoman sultan
- Murad V (1840–1904), Ottoman sultan

=== Others ===
==== Murad ====
- Şehzade Murad (1495–1519), Ottoman prince
- Murad (1911–1997), Indian actor
- Murad Al Maamari, Omani businessman and former naval officer
- Murad Artin (born 1960), Armenian-Swedish politician
- Murad Mirza (1570–1599), second son of Mughal Emperor Akbar
- Murad Baksh (1624–1661), youngest son of Mughal Emperor Shah Jahan and Empress Mumtaz Mahal
- Murad Bey (1750–1801), Egyptian Mamluk chieftain
- Murad Hasratyan (1935–2026), Armenian architecture historian
- Murad Ismail (born 1961), Indonesian politician
- Murad Qureshi (born 1965), British Bangladeshi Labour Party politician
- Murad Umakhanov (born 1977), Russian wrestler and Olympian
- Murad Wilfried Hofmann (1931–2020) German diplomat and author
- Murad Khan (disambiguation), multiple people.
- Murad Yagizarov (1939–2025), Soviet and Azerbaijani actor
- Murad Abdulhadi (born 1971), Ethiopian politician

==== Mourad ====
- Mourad the Great, nickname of Hampartsoum Boyadjian (1860–1915), an Armenian fedayee and political activist
- Mourad Benachenou, Algerian politician
- Mourad Benchellali, French citizen captured and detained in the Guantanamo Bay detention camps
- Mourad Bouzidi (born 1984), Dutch–Tunisian kickboxer
- Mourad Daami (born 1962), Tunisian football referee
- Mourad Daoudi El Ghezouani (born 1998), Moroccan footballer
- Mourad Marofit (born 1982), Moroccan long-distance runner
- Mourad Medelci (1943–2019), Algerian politician
- Mourad Meghni (born 1984), Algerian footballer
- Mourad Salem (born 1956), Tunisian artist based in France
- Mourad Topalian (born 1943), Armenian-American political activist

==== Morad ====
- Morad Fareed (born 1979), New York–based entrepreneur and former athlete
- Morad Mohammadi (born 1980), Iranian wrestler and Olympian
- Morad Sari (born 1973), French-Algerian kickboxer
- Morad (Spanish rapper) (born 1999), Spanish rapper
- Morad (born 1977), French rapper in Scred Connexion

== Surname ==
Murad

- Abdul Hakim Murad (militant) (born 1968), alleged conspirator in the planned attacks called Operation Bojinka
- Abdal Hakim Murad (born: Timothy John Winter, 1960) English academic, theologian and Islamic scholar
- Adel Murad (1949–2018), Iraqi politician
- Ahmad Murad (1943–2004), Bruneian diplomat
- Ferid Murad (1936–2023), American physician and pharmacologist
- Hadji Murad (1818–1852), Avar military commander
- Hilmi Murad (1919–1998), Egyptian politician
- Jerry Murad (1918–1996), American recording artist, an Armenian born in Istanbul, Turkey in 1918
- Mohammad Murad (born 1976), Kuwaiti wildlife photographer
- Murad Ali Murad (born 1960), Afghan Army officer
- Nadia Murad (born 1993), Iraqi Yazidi human rights activist
- Raza Murad (born 1950), Indian character actor, son of Murad
- Sayed Noorullah Murad (born 1979), an Afghan politician, military commander and former deputy minister
- Waheed Murad (1938–1983), Pakistani film producer, writer, and actor
- Zuhair Murad (born 1971), a Beirut-based Lebanese fashion designer

Mourad

- Ahmed Mourad (born 1978), an Egyptian author and screenwriter of fiction and non-fiction
- George Mourad (born 1982), Syrian Swedish footballer of Assyrian descent
- Leila Mourad (1918–1995), Egyptian singer and actress
- Mounir Mourad (1922–1981), Egyptian artist, singer and actor
- Nidal Mourad (born 1988), Canadian musician and producer

Morad

- Daniel Morad (born 1990), Canadian race car driver
- Dashni Morad (born 1986), Kurdish singer, songwriter, television presenter, human rights & environmental activist.
- Luciana Morad (born 1969), also known as Luciana Gimenez, Brazilian fashion model and TV show hostess

== Other names ==
Murad Buildings, Construction company of Uzbekistan

== See also ==
- Moura (surname) Portuguese form of Mourad/Murad
- Murat (disambiguation), modern Turkish spelling of Murad
- Murat (name)
- Murod, an Uzbek given name
- Muradian, Armenian surname
- Muradyan, Armenian surname
- Mrad (disambiguation)
