= Murodov =

Murodov (masculine) or Murodova (feminine) is a patronymic surname derived from the given name Murod. Notable people with the surname include:

- Akmal Murodov, Tajikistani judoka
- Azizbek Murodov, Uzbek wrestler
- Jurabek Murodov, Tajik singer and songwriter
- Botir Murodov, Olympic rower
- Khovar Muradov, Tajik singer
- Otabek Murodov
- Usta Shirin Murodov

== See also ==
- Muradov (surname)
