= 2018 Maluku gubernatorial election =

Democratic Election

← 2013	11 Juni dan 14 Desember 2013	2023 →
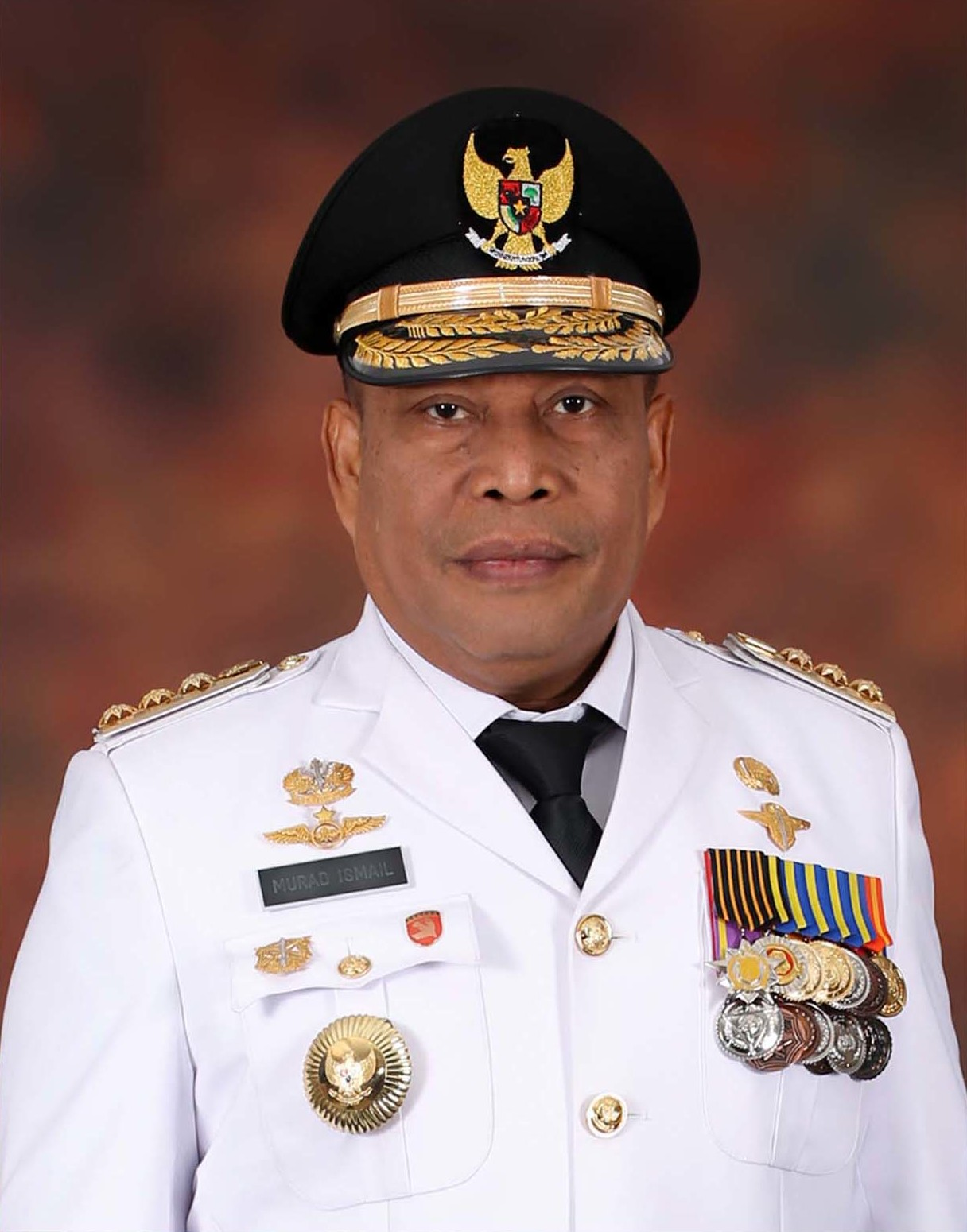

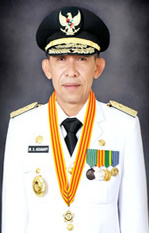
Party	PDI-P	Golkar	Independent
Popular vote	328.982	251.036	225.636
Percentage	40,83%	31,16%	28,01%
- Map of Maluku
Governor before election
Said Assagaff
Golkar
Elected Governor
Murad Ismail
PDI-P

The 2018 Maluku gubernatorial election was held on 27 June 2018 to determine the Governor and Deputy Governor of Maluku. The election took place simultaneously with other regional elections in 2018. Incumbent governor Said Assagaff ran for his second term in office against Commander of the Police Mobile Brigade Corps Murad Ismail. Murad managed to defeat Said, becoming governor on 24 April 2019.

== Candidates ==
Under Indonesia's election regulations, only political parties that have 20% or more of the seats in the Maluku People's Representative Council can nominate candidates. Political parties with less seats can nominate candidates only if they have obtained support from other political parties or through independent channels.

=== Declared ===
Ballot number	Candidate for governor	Candidate for deputy governor	Supporting political parties	Seats in the Regional People's Representative Council	Sumber
1			Golkar, PKS, Demokrat, PBB	18 seats	
1	Said Assagaff	Anderias Rentanubun	Golkar, PKS, Demokrat, PBB	18 seats	
1	Governor of Maluku(2014–2019)	Southeast Maluku Regent(2008–2018)	Golkar, PKS, Demokrat, PBB	18 seats	
2			PDI-P, Gerindra, PPP, Nasdem, Hanura, PAN, PKB, PPKI, Perindo	27 seats	
2	Murad Ismail	Barnabas Orno	PDI-P, Gerindra, PPP, Nasdem, Hanura, PAN, PKB, PPKI, Perindo	27 seats	
2	Commander of the Police Mobile Brigade Corps(2015–2018)	Southwest Maluku District regent(2011–2021)	PDI-P, Gerindra, PPP, Nasdem, Hanura, PAN, PKB, PPKI, Perindo	27 seats	
3			Independent	145.414 Votes	
3	Herman Koedoeboen	Abdullah Vanath	Independent	145.414 Votes	
3	Inspector IV JAM Superintendent of the AGO	Regent of East Seram (2005-2015)	Independent	145.414 Votes	

== Results ==
=== Quick count ===
==== LSI Denny JA ====
- Murad Ismail-Barnabas Orno: 40,22%
- Said Assagaff-Anderias Rentanubun: 31,48%
- Herman Koedoeboen-Abdullah Vanath: 28,30%.

==== KCI-LSI Network ====
- Murad Ismail-Barnabas Orno: 40,63%
- Said Assagaff-Anderias Rentanubun: 32,10%
- Herman Koedoeboen-Abdullah Vanath: 27,27%.

=== Official results ===
==== Total ====
Candidates Governor-Deputy	Results	
Candidates Governor-Deputy	Votes	%
Murad - Barnabas	328.982	40,83%
Said - Anderias	251.036	31,16%
Herman - Vanath	225.636	28,01%
Number of valid votes	805.654	98,97%
Number of invalid votes	8.384	1,03%
Number of valid and invalid votes	814.038	100,00%
Voter participation	814.038	69,12%
Registered voters	1.177.687	100,00%
Source		

==== By regency and city ====
Daerah	Murad-Barnabas	Said-Anderias	Herman-Vanath	Suara sah	Suara tidak sah	Total
Buru Regency	39.168 (65.70%)	15.340 (25.73%)	5.112 (8.57%)	59.620	634	60.254
South Buru Regency	27.513 (64.75%)	8.675 (20.41%)	6.306 (14.84%)	42.494	569	43.063
Aru Islands Regency	20.829 (52.79%)	7.421 (18.81%)	11.203 (28.40%)	39.453	746	40.199
Southwest Maluku Regency	33.521 (81.66%)	4.165 (10.15%)	3.361 (8.19%)	41.047	197	41.244
Central Maluku Regency	75.838 (42.20%)	57.504 (32.00%)	46.349 (25.79%)	179.691	1.478	181.169
Southeast Maluku Regency	6.035 (10.80%)	21.686 (38.81%)	28.158 (50.39%)	55.879	848	56.727
Southwest Maluku Regency	17.587 (36.88%)	21.520 (45.12%)	8.583 (18.00%)	47.690	445	48.135
West Seram Regency	48.719 (47.69%)	29.384 (28.76%)	24.060 (23.55%)	102.163	972	103.135
East Seram Regency	5.847 (8.98%)	32.546 (49.97%)	26.743 (41.06%)	65.136	778	65.914
Ambon	46.139 (32.89%)	41.249 (29.40%)	52.892 (37.70%)	140.280	1.100	141.380
Tual	7.786 (24.18%)	11.546 (35.86%)	12.869 (39.96%)	32.201	617	32.818
Total	328.982 (40.83%)	251.036 (31.16%)	225.636 (28.01%)	805.654	8.384	814.038
