= Muradov =

Muradov (masculine) or Muradova (feminine) is a patronymic surname slavicised from the given name Murad. Notable people with the surname include:

- Akbar Muradov (born 1968), Azerbaijani Paralympic sport shooter
- Bahar Muradova (born 1962), Azerbaijani politician
- Elchin Muradov (born 1989), Azerbaijani Paralympic sprinter
- Fuad Muradov (born 1979), Azerbaijani politician
- Georgiy Muradov (born 1954), Russian diplomat
- Hikmat Muradov (1969–1991), Azerbaijani soldier
- Ilkin Muradov (born 1996), Azerbaijani footballer
- Kamol Muradov (born 1974), Uzbek judoka
- Mahir Muradov (1956–2023), Azerbaijani judge
- Makhmud Muradov (born 1990), Uzbek mixed martial artist
- Musa Muradov (born c. 1958), Russian journalist
- Ogulsapar Muradova (1948–2006), Turkmen activist and journalist
- Raif Muradov (born 1993), Bulgarian footballer
- Rovlan Muradov (born 1998), Azerbaijani footballer
- Rubaba Muradova (1930–1983), Azerbaijani singer
- Ruslan Muradov (1973–1992), Azerbaijani soldier
- Rustam Muradov (born 1973), Russian military officer
- Shirvani Muradov (born 1985), Russian wrestler
- Vidadi Muradov (1956–2021), Azerbaijani carpet specialist and academic
- Xelîlê Çaçan Mûradov (1924–1981), Kurdish journalist

== See also ==
- Murodov
- Muratov (surname)
- Muradeli
