= Moura (surname) =

Moura is a common Portuguese Surname, Moura is a placename, from town of Moura, in Portugal. Moura is a female form of portuguese word "Mouro", a shortened form of Mourisco and means "Maghreb" or "Moroccan", referring to the Moors who, with Arab leadership, conquered the Iberian Peninsula, who came from the Maghreb, but mostly from Morocco. The word Mouro in portuguese (just like "Moro" in spanish) also comes from "Maurus" (pl. "Mauri"), a latinization of the Greek word Μαυρός which means "dark" or "dark-skinned". The Romans used the term "maurus" to name some Berber populations of North Africa.

Notable people with the surname include:

- Alan Casagrande de Moura, Italian-Brazilian footballer
- Ana Moura, Portuguese fado singer
- Ana Moura, Portuguese badminton player
- Ann Moura, American author
- Anthony Moura-Komenan, French-born Ivorian footballer
- Antônio de Moura Carvalho, Brazilian footballer
- Bruna Moura (born 1994), Brazilian cross-country skier
- Cibele Moura (born 1997), Brazilian politician
- Confúcio Moura, Brazilian politician
- Eduardo Moura (born 1980), Brazilian politician
- Eduardo Souto de Moura, Portuguese architect
- Elaine Estrela Moura, Brazilian footballer
- Eleílson Farias de Moura, Brazilian footballer
- Eli-Eri Moura, Brazilian composer
- Fernando Domingos de Moura, Brazilian footballer
- Francisco de Moura, 3rd Marquis of Castelo Rodrigo, Portuguese nobleman
- Francisco Serra e Moura, Portuguese footballer
- Gabi Moura, Brazilian influencer
- Geison Moura, Malaysian footballer
- Hugo Ventura Ferreira Moura Guedes, Portuguese footballer
- Infanta Ana de Jesus Maria of Portugal, Portuguese infanta
- José Barata-Moura, Portuguese philosopher
- José Moura Gonçalves, Brazilian physician, biomedical scientist, biochemist and educator
- José Vicente de Moura, Portuguese sports administrator
- Julio César de Andrade Moura, Brazilian footballer
- Júlio Soares de Moura Neto, Brazilian admiral
- Kerlon Moura Souza, Brazilian footballer
- Roberto Landell de Moura, Brazilian Roman Catholic priest and inventor
- Leonardo Moura (disambiguation), many people
- Leonardo da Silva Moura, Brazilian footballer
- Leonardo David de Moura, Brazilian footballer
- Leonardo José Aparecido Moura, Brazilian footballer
- Lucas Rodrigues Moura da Silva, a footballer who joined Spurs in 2018
- Lucimar de Moura, Brazilian track and field athlete
- Manuel de Moura, 2nd Marquis of Castelo Rodrigo, Portuguese nobleman
- Margarida Moura, Portuguese tennis player
- Maria Lacerda de Moura, Brazilian anarcha-feminist
- Mayana Moura, Brazilian actress
- Mike Moura, Portuguese footballer
- Moisés Moura Pinheiro, Brazilian footballer
- Nuno José Severo de Mendoça Rolim de Moura Barreto, 1st Duke of Loulé, Portuguese nobleman
- Paulo de Moura, Portuguese handball coach
- Paulo Moura, Brazilian clarinetist and saxophonist
- Paula Moura (1996-), Brazilian drummer
- Rafael Moura, Brazilian footballer
- Robson Moura, Brazilian jujitsu competitor
- Romário Leiria de Moura, Brazilian footballer
- Severino Lima de Moura, Brazilian footballer
- Timothy Moura, American professional wrestler
- Toninho Moura, Brazilian football manager
- Vasco Graça Moura, Portuguese politician
- Venâncio da Silva Moura, Angolan politician and diplomat
- Wagner Moura, Brazilian actor
- Wander Moura, Brazilian long-distance runner
- Weverson Leandro Oliveira Moura, Brazilian footballer
- Wilson Rodrigues de Moura Júnior, Brazilian footballer
- Saint Moura, Egyptian saint

== See also ==
- Moro (surname)
- Mourad
- Murad
- Murat (name)
- Mourão
- Mourinho
