= Said Assagaff =

Indonesian politician (1953–2025)

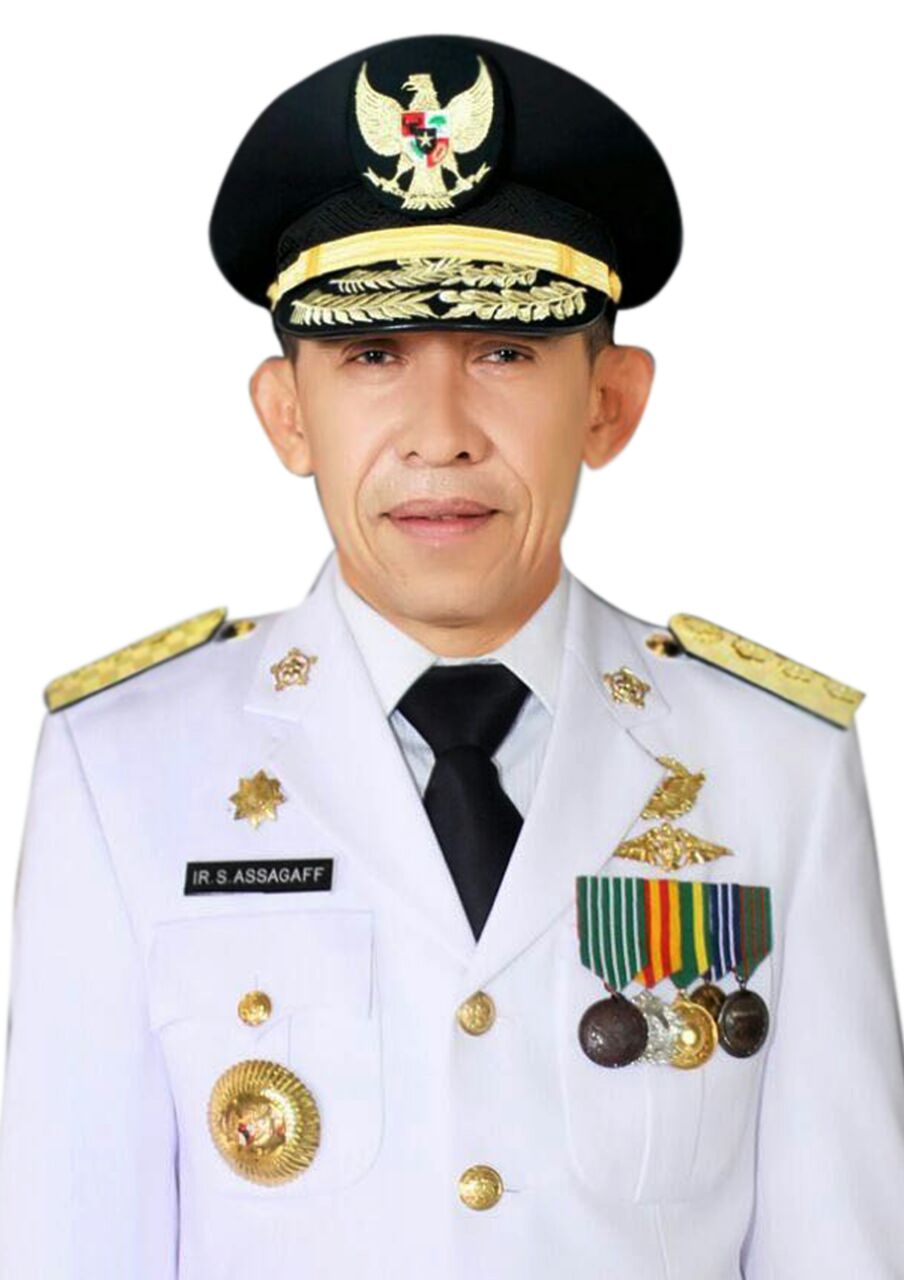

12th Governor of Maluku
- In office 10 March 2014 – 10 March 2019
- President: Susilo Bambang Yudhoyono; Joko Widodo
- Deputy: Zeth Sahuburua
- Preceded by: Saut Situmorang
- Succeeded by: Murad Ismail

Personal details
- Born: 29 November 1953 Ambon, Maluku, Indonesia
- Died: 30 November 2025 (aged 72) Jakarta, Indonesia
- Party: Golkar

Said Assagaff (29 November 1953 – 30 November 2025) was an Indonesian politician who served as the 12th governor of Maluku from 2014 to 2019, with Zeth Sahuburua as his deputy governor. Prior to his tenure as governor he was Regional Secretary of Maluku, Deputy Governor of Maluku, and worked at the provincial government of Maluku.

== Early life and education ==
Said Assagaff was born in Ambon, Maluku, Indonesia, on 29 November 1953. He graduated from college with a bachelor's degree in animal husbandry from Hasanuddin University, Makassar.

== Career ==
During Said's time in Maluku's provincial government, he was head of agriculture, acting deputy head of research, head of economics, deputy chair, and acting chair. He served as Regional Secretary and then as Deputy Governor of Maluku from 2008 to 2013.

In the 2013 election, Said was elected Governor of Maluku with Zeth Sahuburua as his deputy. Their campaign was supported by the Golkar, United Development, and Prosperous Justice parties. The unemployment rate in Maluku declined from 18.44% in 2014, to 17.85% in 2018. Murad Ismail defeated Said, with Anderias Rentanubun as his running mate in the 2018 Maluku gubernatorial election. Regional Secretary of Maluku Hamin bin Thahir became acting governor after Said's term ended on 10 March 2019.

In 2016, Said was elected for a five-year term as chair of the regional leadership council of Golkar in Maluku. Hendrik Lewerissa selected Said to be the head of his transition team after winning the 2024 Maluku gubernatorial election.

== Death ==
Said died in Jakarta on 30 November 2025, after receiving treatment at the Dr. Cipto Mangunkusumo Hospital. He was 72. Lewerissa led a ceremony at Said's house to release his remains on 1 December.

== Works cited ==
=== News ===
- "Assagaff: Tingkat Kemiskinan Di Maluku Turun Tipis". Maluku Post. 5 March 2019. Archived from the original on 6 July 2025.
- "Hendrik-Vanath Bentuk Tim Transisi, Diketuai Mantan Gubernur Maluku". Ameks. 17 January 2025. Archived from the original on 6 July 2025.
- "Mendagri Setujui Hamin Bin Thahir Plh Gubernur Maluku". Maluku Post. 13 March 2019. Archived from the original on 6 July 2025.
- "Said Assagaff Terpilih Aklamasi Pimpin Golkar Maluku". Maluku Post. 29 August 2016. Archived from the original on 6 July 2025.
- Afrisia, Rizky (28 December 2013). "Said-Zeth Resmi Jadi Pemimpin Maluku Terpilih". Viva. Archived from the original on 9 January 2014.
- Putra, Putu (1 December 2025). "Mantan Gubernur Maluku Said Assagaff Meninggal Dunia, Airlangga: Sosok yang Baik dan Pekerja Keras". Liputan 6.

=== Web ===
- "Gubernur Hendrik Lewerissa Pimpin Upacara Kedinasan, Kenang Almarhum Said Assagaff sebagai Pemimpin Berintegritas". Maluku. 1 December 2025. Archived from the original on 2 December 2025.
- "Profil Gubernur". Maluku. Archived from the original on 12 May 2018.
- "Sertifikat Rekapitulasi Hasil Penghitungan Suara Dari Setiap Kabupaten/Kota Di Tingkat Provinsi Dalam Pemilihan Gubernur Dan Wakil Gubernur Tahun 2018". General Elections Commission. Archived from the original on 2 September 2021.
