= Muratov =

Muratov (masculine) or Muratova (feminine) is a patronymic surname derived from the given name Murat.

The surname may refer to:

- Dmitry Muratov (born 1961), Russian editor-in-chief of the Novaya Gazeta newspaper, Nobel Peace Prize laureate
- Evgeny Muratov (born 1981), Russian ice hockey player
- Kira Muratova (1934–2018), Ukrainian film director, screenwriter and actress
- Zair Muratov (died 1942), Soviet soldier and prisoner-of-war
- Pavel Muratov (1881–1950), Russian writer and historian
- Radner Muratov (1928–2004), Russian Tatar actor
- Sergey Muratov (disambiguation) – several people
- Sofia Muratova (1929–2006), Soviet gymnast
- Tatiana Mouratova (Muratova) (born 1979), Russian pentathlete
- Valentin Muratov (1928–2006), Soviet Olympic gymnast
- Valery Muratov (born 1946), Soviet Olympic ice speed skater

== See also ==
- Muradov (surname)
