= Murod =

Murod is a masculine given name. Murodov (masculine) or Murodova (feminine) are patronymic surnames derived from it.

Murod may refer to:

== People ==
- Murod Khanturaev (1987–2021), Uzbek mixed martial artist
- Murod Kholmukhamedov (born 1990), Uzbek footballer
- Murod Rajabov (born 1995), Uzbek footballer
- Murod Zukhurov (born 1983), Uzbek retired football goalkeeper

== Fictional characters ==
- Emperor Murod of Orenia, villain of the video game Summoner

== See also ==
- Murad
