= Leonardo Moura =

Leonardo Moura may refer to:

- Leonardo da Silva Moura (born 1978), Brazilian footballer
- Leonardo David de Moura (born 1983), Brazilian footballer
- Leonardo José Aparecido Moura (born 1986), Brazilian footballer
- Leonardo de Moura, a researcher at Microsoft Research who wrote Z3 and Lean

== See also ==
- Moura (surname)
