= Governor of Maluku =

- Coat of arms of the Province

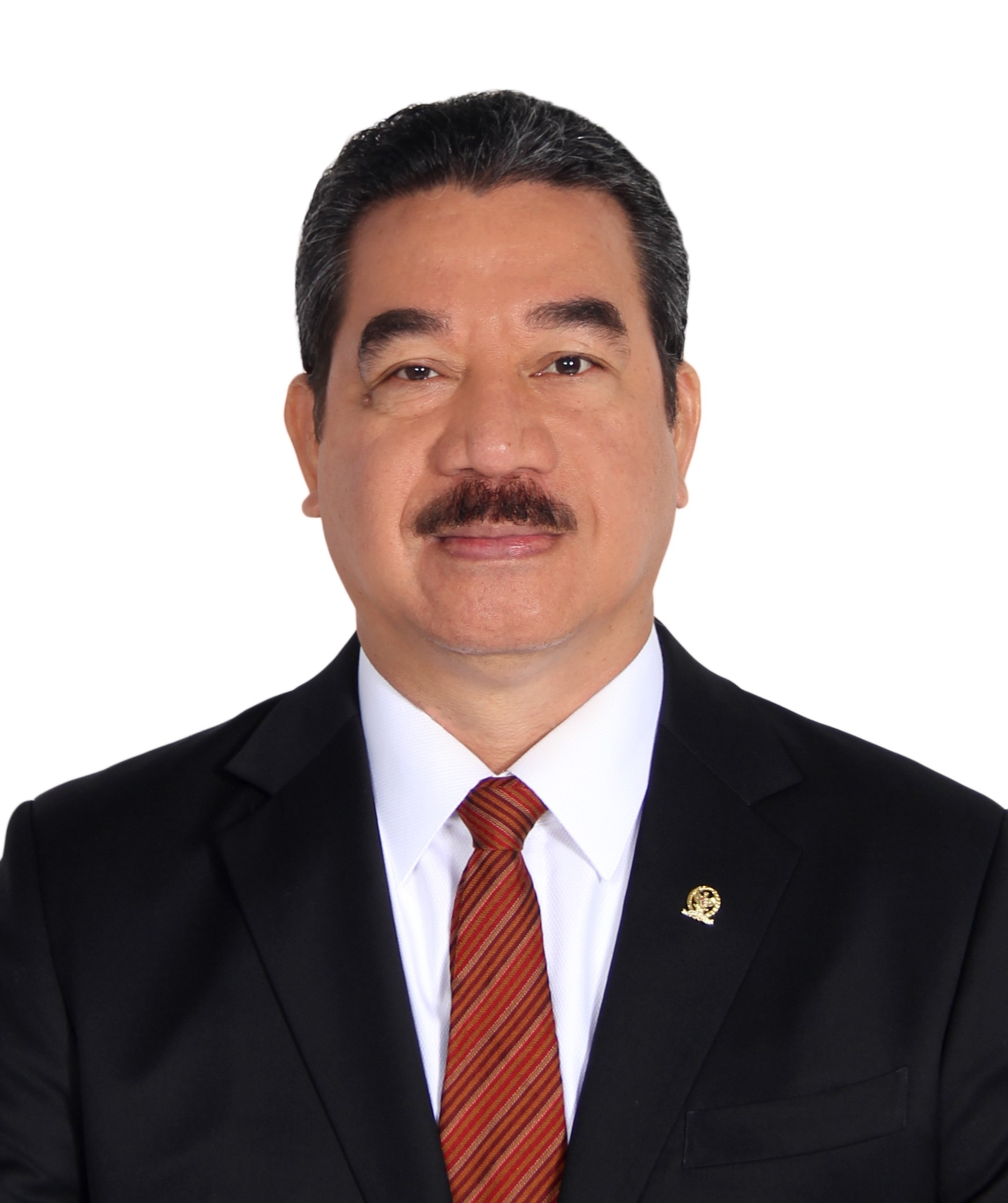
- Incumbent; Hendrik Lewerissa since 20 February 2025
- Term length: Five years
- Inaugural holder: Johannes Latuharhary
- Formation: 19 August 1945
- Website: malukuprov.go.id

The governor of Maluku (Indonesian: Gubernur Maluku) is the first-level regional head in Maluku (province) along with the deputy governor and 45 members of the Moluccas Regional House of Representatives. The governor and deputy governor of Maluku are elected through general elections which are held every five years. The current governor of Maluku is Hendrik Lewerissa and the deputy governor is Abdullah Vanath.

== List of governors ==
No.	Photo	Governor	Tenure	Party	Deputy Governor	Notes
1		Johannes Latuharhary	1950–1955			
2		Muhammad Djosan	1955–1960			
3		Muhammad Padang	1960–1965			
4		G.J. Latumahina	1965–1968			
5		Soemitro	1968–1973			
6		Soumeru	1973–1975			
7		Hasan Slamet	1975–1985			
8		Sebastian Soekoso	1985–1993			
9		M. Akib Latuconsina	1993–1998		R.S. Soeranto	
10		Dr. M. Saleh Latuconsina	1998–2003		Paula Bataona Renyaan	
11		Brigjen TNI (Purn) Karel Albert Ralahalu	2003–2013	PDIP	Said Assagaff	
12		Said Assagaff	2014–2019	Golkar	Zeth Sahuburua	
13		Murad Ismail	2019 – 2024	PDIP	Barnabas N. Orno	
14		Hendrik Lewerissa	2025	Gerindra	Abdullah Vanath	

== List of colonial governors ==
The Moluccas have been colonized by Portuguese, Spaniards, Dutch, English and finally independence as a part of Indonesia. Below is a list of governors.

No.	Name	Tenure
A	Ruled By Portugal	
1	Antonio de Brito	1522 – 1525
2	Garcia Henriques	1525–1527
3	Jorge de Meneses	1527–1530
4	Gonçalo Pereira	1530–1531
5	Vicente da Fonseca	1531–1534
6	Tristão de Ataide	1534–1536
7	Antonio Galvão	1536–1540
8	Jorge de Castro	1540–1544
9	Jordão de Freitas	1544–1546
10	Bernaldim de Sousa	1546–1549
11	Cristovão de Sa	Oct 1549 – Oct 1550
12	Francisco Lopes de Sousa	1552 – Feb 1554
13	Cristovão de Sa	Feb 1554 – Nov 1555
14	Duarte d'Eça	1555 – Dec 1558
15	António Pereira Brandão	Dec 1558 – Oct 1560
16	Manoel de Vasconcellos	Oct 1560 – 1561
17	Bastião Machado	Oct 1560 – 1561
18	Henrique de Sa	Mar 1562 – 1564
19	Alvaro de Mendonça	1564–1567
20	Diogo Lopes de Mesquita	1567–1571
21	Alvaro de Ataide	1571 – Dec 1574
22	Nuno Pereira de Lacerda	Dec 1574 – 28 Dec 1575
23	Sancho de Vasconcellos	1575–1578
24	Diogo de Azambuja	Dec 1582 – Jan 1586
25	Duarte Pereire de Sampaio	Jan 1586 – 1589
26	Rui Dias da Cunha	1589–1592
27	Tristão de Sousa	1592–1595
28	Julião de Noronha	1595 – 20 Nov 1598
29	Rui Gonçalves de Sequeira	20 Nov 1598 – Feb 1602
30	Pedro Alvares de Abreu	Feb 1602 – 19 May 1605
B	Ruled By Spain	1606–1663
1	Juan de Esquivel	1606–1609
2	Lucas de Vergara Gaviria	1606–1609
3	Cristobál de Azcueata Menchaca	1610–1612
4	Jerónimo de Silva	1612–1617
5	Lucas de Vergara Gaviria	1617–1620
6	Luis de Bracamonte	1620–1623
7	Pedro de Heredia	1623–1636
8	Pedro Muñoz de Carmona y Mendiola	1636–1640
9	Francesco Suárez de Figueroa	1640–1642
10	Pedro Fernández del Rio	1642–1643
11	Lorenzo de Olaso Achotegui	1643–1652
12	Pedro Fernández del Rio	1652
13	Francesco de Esteybar	1652–1656
14	Diego Sarria Lascano	1659–1660
15	Francesco de Esteybar	1658–1659
16	Francesco de Atienza Ibañez	1659–1660
17	Juan de Chaves	1660–1661
18	Agustín de Cepeda Carnacedo	1661–1663
19	Francesco de Atienza Ibañez	1663
C	Ruled By Netherlands	
1	Frank van der Does	1599 – c.1602
2	Jan Pieterszen Suyer	Jan 1601 – 1602
3	Christiaen Adriaensz den Dorst	Sep 1602 – 1604
4	Anthonie van Suylen van Nyevelt	Sep 1602 – 1604
5	Adriaan Antoniszen	Jul 1605 – Mar 1606
6	Gerrit Gerritszen van der Buis & Pieter Janszen Boenen	1607–1608
7	Adriaen Woutersz	1608–1610
8	Paulus van Caerden	1610–1612
9	Pieter Both	1612–1616
10	Laurens Reaal	1616–1621
11	Frederik Houtman	1621–1623
12	Jacques le Fèbre	1623–1627
13	Gilles van Zeijst	1627–1628
14	Pieter Wagensveld	1628–1629
15	Gijsbert van Lodestein	1629–1633
16	Johan Ottens	1633–1635
17	Jan van Broekom	1635–1640
18	Anthonij Caen	1640–1642
19	Wouter Seroijen	1642–1648
20	Gaspar van den Bogaerde	1648–1653
21	Jacob Hustaart	1653–1656
22	Simon Cos	1656–1662
23	Anthonij van Voorst	1662–1667
24	Maximilian de Jong	1667–1669
25	Abraham Verspreet	1669–1672
26	Cornelis Franks	1672–1674
27	Willem Corput	1675–1675
28	Willem Harthouwer	1676–1676
29	Jacob de Ghein	1676–1677
30	Robbert Padtbrugge	1677–1682
31	Jacob Lobs	1682–1686
32	Johan Henrik Thim	1686–1689
33	Johannes Cops	1689–1692
34	Cornelis van der Duin	1692–1696
35	Salomon le Sage	1696–1701
36	Pieter Rooselaar	1701–1706
37	Jacob Claaszoon	1706–1710
38	David van Petersom	1710–1715
39	Jacob Bottendorp	1715–1720
40	Antoni Heinsius	1720–1723
41	Jacob Cloeck	1723–1724
42	Joan Happon	1724–1728
43	Jacob Christiaan Pielat	1728–1731
44	Elias de Haeze	1728–1731
45	Johannes Bernard	1728–1731
46	Paulus Rouwenhoff	1735–1739
47	Marten Lelievelt	1739–1744
48	Gerrard van Brandwijk van Blokland	1744–1750
49	J.E. van Mijlendonk	1750–1754
50	Abraham Abeleven	1754–1758
51	Jacob van Schoonderwoert	1754–1758
52	Hendrik Breton	1766–1767
53	Paulus Jacob Valckenaer	1771–1778
54	Jacob Roeland Thomaszen	1778–1780
55	Alexander Cornabé	1780–1793
56	J. Ekenholm	1793–1796
57	Johan Godfried Burdach	1796–1799
58	Willem Jacob Cranssen	13 Sep 1799 – 21 Jun 1801
D	Ruled By England	
1	K.T. Farquhar	21 Jun 1801 – 1803
2	H. Webber	1803
3	Peter Adrianus Goldbach	1803–1804
4	Carel Lodewijk Wieling	1804–1809
5	R. Coop à Groen	1809–1810
6	E. Tucker	1810–1811
7	Forbes	1811
8	W. Ewer	1811–1813
9	W.G. Mackenzie	1813–1815
10	R. Stuart	1815–1816
11	W.G. Mackenzie	1816 – 20 Apr 1817

== See also ==
- List of rulers of Maluku
- People from Maluku Islands
