= Johannes Latuharhary =

Indonesian politician and nationalist (1900–1959)

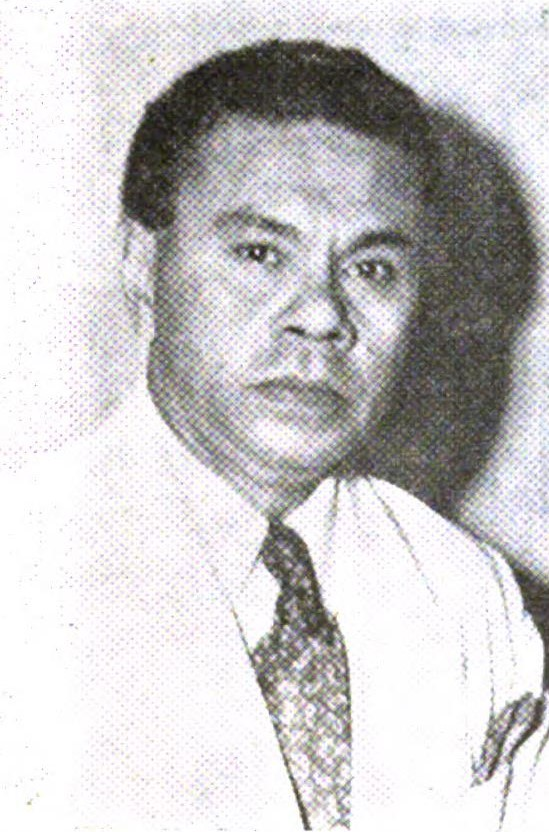
- Official portrait, 1954

1st Governor of Maluku
- In office 19 August 1945 (Note: De jure appointed on 19 August 1945, became a governor–in–exile, but did not assume office in Maluku until 1950.) – 9 February 1955
- Preceded by: Office established
- Succeeded by: Muhammad Djosan

Personal details
- Born: 6 July 1900 Ullath, Saparua, Amboina Afdeeling, Dutch East Indies
- Died: 8 November 1959 (aged 59) Jakarta, Indonesia
- Resting place: Kalibata Heroes' Cemetery
- Party: PIR (1948–1959)
- Other political affiliations: PNI (1946–1948)
- Spouse: Yet Pattyrajawane (m. 1931)
- Children: 7
- Education: Leiden University (Mr.)
- Occupation: Politician; advocate

Johannes Latuharhary (6 July 1900 – 8 November 1959) was an Indonesian politician and nationalist of Moluccan descent, who served as the first Indonesian governor of Maluku from 1945 until 1955, though he did not assume office in Maluku until 1950. A Protestant Christian, Latuharhary was an early proponent of Moluccan inclusion in the Indonesian state and he was an active participant in the struggle for Indonesia's independence.

Born in Ullath, Saparua, Latuharhary moved to Batavia to pursue higher education, before receiving a scholarship to study at Leiden University. Upon his return to the East Indies, he worked as a judge in East Java and began participating in the Indonesian nationalist movement through the Ambonese diaspora association Sarekat Ambon. He later resigned from his position as judge and became an advocate and politician, merging the Sarekat with the mainstream movement of Indonesian nationalism after initial rifts caused by the issue of religion in politics.

He moved to Jakarta and worked under the Department of Home Affairs during the Japanese occupation of the Dutch East Indies to manage Moluccans in Java, being arrested three times for different reasons. By 1945, had become a member of the BPUPK and PPKI organizations. Through his membership in the BPUPK and PPKI, Latuharhary took part in the initial drafting of the Constitution of Indonesia. He unsuccessfully championed federalism and opposed the inclusion of religion in government through the Jakarta Charter and later opposing the formation of the Ministry of Religious Affairs.

Following the proclamation of independence, he was appointed Governor of Maluku, but could not take power and instead organized Moluccans in Java to join the revolutionary cause. He was for some time part of the Central Indonesian National Committee leadership and he participated in the Indonesian delegations of the Renville and the Roem–Van Roijen Agreements. He eventually took office in 1950, where he attempted to establish the government and rebuild the ruined city of Ambon, before he was removed from his post. He died on 8 November 1959.

== Early life and career ==
=== Education ===
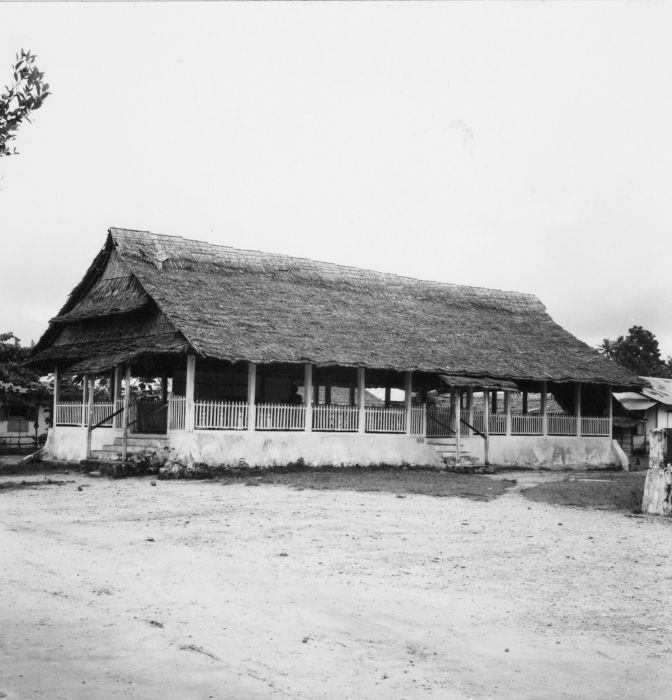
Latuharhary's home village of Ullath, Saparua

Latuharhary was born on 6 July 1900, in Ullath, Saparua, in what was then the Dutch East Indies (now Indonesia), to the couple of Jan Latuharhary, a school teacher in a neighboring village, and Josefin Hiarej. He initially studied at the local first grade school in Saparua which taught students the Dutch language, but he later moved to Ambon at the age of 9 to study at a Europeesche Lagere School (ELS) there. Though the ELS was primarily designated for Europeans, He was admitted as his father was a teacher. He studied there up until 1917, before he moved to Batavia for higher education. In Batavia, he graduated from the city's Hogere Burgerschool (HBS) in 1923.

After graduating from the HBS, Latuharhary later received a scholarship from the Ambonsch Studiefonds to study at the Leiden University. Throughout his time at Leiden, Latuharhary did not directly participate within the student organization Perhimpoenan Indonesia (PI), but he had significant interactions with its members and is often considered as a member due to his connections with PI leaders such as Ali Sastroamidjojo and Iwa Koesoemasoemantri. In June 1927, he graduated from Leiden, becoming the first Moluccan to receive a Meester in de Rechten (Master of Law) degree from the university. By the time Latuharhary returned home, his time in Leiden had made him a proponent of Indonesian nationalism and unity.

=== Early career ===
Following his return to the Indies, Latuharhary (who had secured a recommendation letter from his professor Cornelis van Vollenhoven) was hired as an assistant at Surabaya's High Court, and he was later promoted to a judge there before being appointed chief judge in the district court at Kraksaan (in what is today Probolinggo) in 1929. He also joined the Sarekat Ambon (SA; Ambon Association) and worked on its reorganization after its leader Alexander Jacob Patty was exiled to Bengkulu then Digul. He was also assigned as the chief editor of the SA's official newspaper Haloean, and applied for the SA to be granted legal status in 1930, though it did not receive it until 1933. Latuharhary also formed a trade cooperative for Moluccans in response to the economic hardships from the Great Depression.

Several members of the SA had proposed for the organization to join the Association of Political Organisations of the Indonesian People (PPPKI), which consisted of various nationalist and local organizations such as the Indonesian National Party, Sarekat Islam and Budi Utomo. Latuharhary was, however, opposed to the inclusion of religious organizations in political movements, and the SA did not join the PPPKI initially. Eventually, however, in the SA's third congress in early 1932, the leadership made the decision to join the PPPKI. Latuharhary had previously participated in the PPPKI's congress in January 1932, where he delivered his preamble Azab Sengsara Kepoelauan Maloekoe (Suffering of the Mollucas) which described economic devastation by the Dutch East India Company. He also wrote that the Dutch education system for the Moluccans was geared towards creating "scribes and clerks, soldiers and sailors".

== Political career ==
=== Dutch colonial period ===
Throughout this time, Latuharhary had leaned towards a more federalist structure for the future Indonesian state, in accordance to others such as Sam Ratulangi, Tan Malaka and Mohammad Hatta. In 1932, his preamble was published as a book, though it was censured by the colonial government. He later resigned from being chief judge following an ultimatum from the colonial government to pick between his job or being part of the nationalist movement, and he became a lawyer instead. As an advocate, one of his first cases was suing sugar factories for taking over local farmers' land. Latuharhary won the case and gained local renown in East Java, and he was elected a member of the Regentschapsraad (municipal council) of Kraksaan.

During his time at Kraksaan, Latuharhary married Yet Pattyrajawane on 26 September 1931. The couple had seven children together. Latuharhary moved with his family to Malang in 1934 and later was elected to East Java's Provinciale Raad (provincial council). He was a member of the council until 1942. Latuharhary was later named as chairman of the Jong Ambon (Ambon Youth) upon the organization's founding in 1936. Three years later, Latuharhary ran for a seat in the Volksraad, campaigning in Ambon. Throughout the campaigns, Latuharhary spread his nationalist views and set up or restored several SA branches. In the end, he lost to a candidate from the Regentenbond (nobles' association). He later joined the Great Indonesia Party (Parindra), a pro-independence political party.

=== Japanese occupation ===
Following the Japanese invasion and takeover of the colony, Latuharhary and other Parindra leaders were arrested and imprisoned. After around four months, his wife managed to convince a Japanese admiral to arrange for the party leader's release. In September 1942, Latuharhary moved to the recently renamed Jakarta, where he took care of the wives and children of Moluccan and Timorese soldiers who were arrested or had evacuated to Australia. After moving to Jakarta, Latuharhary also began working for the Japanese, under the Department of Home Affairs to manage the Moluccans in Java, holding responsibility for their actions.

In 1944, a group of Ambonese including Latuharhary were arrested by the Kenpeitai and brought to Bogor as they were suspected of espionage for the Allied forces, and due to the fact that Latuharhary had partly used his position within the Japanese administration for political purposes. However, his wife and two others again managed to convince a Japanese Navy commander to arrange for their release. In late 1944, he was again arrested after a Moluccan prisoner escaped from a prison. Japanese authorities at the time were particularly suspicious of the Ambonese after the Battle of Morotai and the strategic bombing of Ambon in 1944, further fueled by Allied espionage operations in the Moluccas led by Ambonese Julius Tahija.

=== Constitutional debates ===
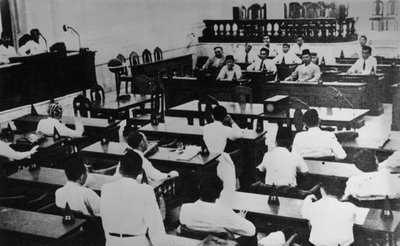
First Session of the Investigating Committee for Preparatory Work for Independence

By early 1945, the Japanese began promising Indonesian independence, and the Investigating Committee for Preparatory Work for Independence (BPUPK) was formed with Latuharhary as a member representing the Moluccas. Latuharhary had called a meeting of Ambonese leaders in Java in May 1945 and informed them that Japanese authorities wanted the Ambonese to stop resistance activities and instead participate in the independence movement. At the BPUPK, Latuharhary proposed the formation of a federal state over a unitary state, though proposal was shot down after only 2 out of 19 members of the BPUPK voted for it.

He was also opposed to the inclusion of the seven words in the Jakarta Charter – "dengan kewajiban menjalankan syariat Islam bagi pemeluknya" ("an obligation of sharia for Muslims") – due to its consequences for non-Muslims and to its impact on customary laws. Furthermore, Latuharhary also opposed a proposition by Wahid Hasyim that only Muslims would be allowed to become President and/or Vice President, noting that the majority Christian regions in Indonesia would not be willing to be part of an Islamic state. The proposal was also opposed by secular nationalists such as Wongsonegoro and Husein Jayadiningrat.

Eventually, Latuharhary – alongside the other Christian representative Alexander Andries Maramis – yielded following Sukarno's request. On 14 August, Latuharhary was appointed to the BPUPK's successor, the Preparatory Committee for Indonesian Independence (PPKI). The clauses preferring Islam were later removed from the Constitution of Indonesia and the Pancasila). This was preceded by a visit from a Japanese navy officer to Muhammad Hatta on the evening of 17 August (Note: Shortly after the proclamation of independence that morning, where Latuharhary was also present.) The officer warned Hatta that Christian nationalists from Eastern Indonesia (Note: Robert Elson wrote that the referred persons were among the five members of the BPUPK from outside Sumatra and Java: Latuharhary, Maramis, Sam Ratulangi, Andi Pangerang Pettarani and I Gusti Ketut Pudja, who had shown disagreement during the drafting of the clauses.) "prefer to stand outside the Republic of Indonesia" unless the seven words were removed. Hatta called an emergency meeting and managed to convince the Muslim nationalists to yield on the clauses, and the assembly further removed several terms and clauses (Note: As examples, the words "Allah" and "Mukadimah" (Arabic for "God" and "Preamble") were replaced with "Tuhan" and "Pembukaan" respectively – more generic terms, though "Allah" eventually remained in the Constitution.) which was seen as favoring Islam. Latuharhary was also opposed to the formation of a religious ministry and proposed it be included as a bureau under the Ministry of Education and Culture instead – the formation failed at first, though a religious ministry was eventually formed in January 1946.

=== National Revolution ===
==== Early National Revolution ====
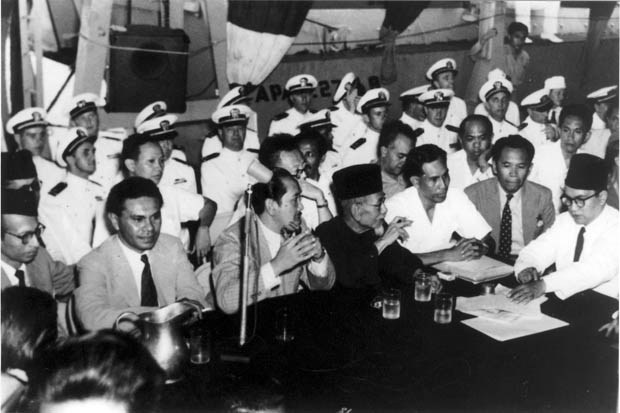
Latuharhary (second from left) aboard the USS Renville in January 1948, prior to the Renville Agreement

Latuharhary was appointed Governor of Maluku in the PPKI's 19 August 1945 meeting, alongside governors for seven other formed provinces. This appointment, however, did not come with any administrative duties as Latuharhary was unable to travel to the Moluccas at the time, due to Australian troops already establishing themselves in the region shortly after the surrender of Japan. Later on, Latuharhary joined the Central Indonesian National Committee (KNIP) and was elected as one of its deputy speakers in the body's first session.

On 17 October, Latuharhary handed over KNIP's leadership to Sutan Sjahrir, after he and Sartono failed to defend the older leadership against a motion led by Sukarni to replace KNIP's leadership. Latuharhary formed the Angkatan Pemuda Indonesia Ambon/API-Ambon (Ambonese Indonesian Youth Movement) on 5 September. He then called for the community leaders of the Moluccan communities in Java (Note: At the time, there were around 30,000 Moluccans living across Java and Madura.) for a meeting in Jakarta on 6 October 1945. The outcome of the meeting was to support the independence movement. Soon afterwards, however, the Dutch returned under the Netherlands Indies Civil Administration with KNIL soldiers, a number of whom were Ambonese.

This resulted in significant distrust of the Ambonese in Java, and there were a considerable number of Ambonese who sided with the Dutch instead of with the nationalists. In the Moluccas itself, recruitment of Ambonese soldiers to the KNIL resumed as soon as the Dutch regained control of the region, and in Jakarta clashes occurred between the nationalist armed forces and KNIL's Ambonese soldiers, with reprisal attacks against Ambonese civilians in Jakarta. Latuharhary issued an appeal to the Ambonese to join the nationalist cause on 9 October, but on 13 October a nationalist-affiliated group issued a declaration calling for guerrilla and economic warfare against the Dutch, the Eurasians and the Ambonese, complicating affairs.

==== Later National Revolution ====
Latuharhary spoke with Sukarno, requesting to be granted authority in Java and Sumatra to be able to manage Moluccans there, but he was initially denied. Later, Hatta intervened and Latuharhary's request was granted with the condition that the authority would be transferred to another appointed official upon Latuharhary's departure to Maluku. Shortly afterwards, Latuharhary issued another call for Moluccans to join the revolutionary cause and later in December 1945 established offices in urban centers across Java to arrange for the safety and return of Moluccans. Aside from those in the KNIL, there were Moluccan soldiers fighting on the side of the Indonesian government – notably, in Surabaya, where the Ambonese youth had formed the Pemoeda Repoeblik Indonesia Maloekoe/PRIM (Republic of Indonesia Moluccan Youth), which fought during the Battle of Surabaya. These youths would later form the Pattimura Division in October 1946, to which Latuharhary was Chief Adviser. (Note: Due to the Dutch offensive in 1947 and "rationalization and reorganization" following the Madiun affair, the division was reduced to a regiment in 1947 and to a battalion in 1948.)

Latuharhary also arranged for a small expedition to the Moluccas – which briefly seized power in Buru until Dutch authorities sent reinforcements from Ambon and captured or killed the pro-Indonesian soldiers. Due to the establishment of the United States of Indonesia in the Linggadjati Agreement, Sukarno abolished the Governor of Maluku's office in July 1947. Following a United Nations-brokered ceasefire, Latuharhary was part of the Indonesian delegation under Mohammad Roem which eventually led to the Roem–Van Roijen Agreement in May 1949. Latuharhary also pushed for the Indonesian government to recognize the State of East Indonesia as part of the United States of Indonesia, which it did in January 1948 with Latuharhary being sent as the envoy. Politically, Latuharhary was affiliated with the Indonesian National Party (PNI), where he was a member of its central leadership in the organizational section. Within the party, he was considered part of a "Kaigun Group" – largely comprising former law students in the Netherlands. (Note: Members of the "Kaigun Group" included Latuharhary, Maramis, Iwa Kusumasumantri, Gatot Taroenamihardja and Soeprapto. The group was considered close to Japanese Rear Admiral Tadashi Maeda.) In December 1948, following a split within the PNI over negotiations between Hatta and the Dutch, Latuharhary left the PNI and joined the Great Indonesia Unity Party (PIR) under Wongsonegoro.

=== Governor of Maluku ===
After the Dutch–Indonesian Round Table Conference and the recognition of Indonesian sovereignty, Latuharhary assumed his post as the Governor of Maluku following the invasion of Ambon and the suppression of the Republic of South Maluku (RMS). Latuharhary arrived in an Ambon devastated by fighting between TNI and the RMS on 12 December 1950. Latuharhary began reestablishing the government, recruiting former SA members and some former colonial civil servants to fill in government positions. He also eliminated the South Maluku area and split it into two halves: the Central Maluku and Southeast Maluku regencies. The reconstruction of Ambon also commenced at the start of his term. Throughout his term, Maluku was placed under a "State of War Emergency" until 30 July 1952, when it was converted to a "State of War" just in Ambon and Ceram. Latuharhary pushed for the status to be removed in entirety. Latuharhary's tenure as governor ended following the split between the PIR and the ruling Ali Sastroamidjojo Cabinet, which was followed by pressure from PNI and Masyumi to replace Latuharhary. Eventually, the cabinet opted to replace Latuharhary with Indonesian Socialist Party member Muhammad Djosan, and Latuharhary was reassigned to the Ministry of Home Affairs. Latuharhary maintained his post until 9 February 1955.

== Death and legacy ==
Latuharhary died on 8 November 1959, after having fallen in a coma on 6 November. He fell comatose in his house as he was preparing to depart for a church meeting, and he was brought to the Dr. Cipto Mangunkusumo Hospital. Previously, he had just returned from an official trip to Riau. I. O. Nanulaitta, Latuharhary's biographer, wrote that Latuharhary's assignment in the Ministry of Home Affairs did not carry any particular tasks and had pressured him psychologically – with both Nanulaitta and Latuharhary's brother-in-law noting that Latuharhary would become pensive often. He was buried in the Kalibata Heroes' Cemetery the following day, with fellow Ambonese nationalist leader Johannes Leimena delivering his eulogy.

After Latuharhary's death, the Government of Indonesia awarded him the Bintang Mahaputera Utama. A bridge and two roads in Jakarta and Ambon, Maluku, are named after him, in addition to a cargo ship. The ship was a ca. 14,000 dwt general B-454 class cargo motor ship, built in Szczecin, Poland, and given to her Indonesian owners early in October 1964. There is also a "Mr. J. Latuharhary Foundation" based in Ambon which published the Sinar Harapan newspaper there. In 1965, the cargo vessel Johannes Latuharhary was briefly detained in the United States during a period of tensions with Indonesia. Australian historian Richard Chauvel wrote that Latuharhary was "the first Ambonese leader to formulate an argument for Ambon's inclusion in an independent Indonesia and to consider Ambonese as Indonesians".

One of his successors as the Governor of Maluku, Muhammad Padang, wrote the following about Latuharhary:

One can be opposed politically with Latuharhary, but regarding his struggle, honesty and patriotism, that is rarely found (Note: Original: "Orang boleh bertentangan politik dengan Latuharhary, tetapi mengenai perjuangannya, kejujurannya dan pengabdiannya kepada tanah air, jarang kita temukan bandingannya".)

Padang also credited Latuharhary with establishing the foundations for governance in Maluku during the difficult times of the RMS rebellion.
