= Ullath =

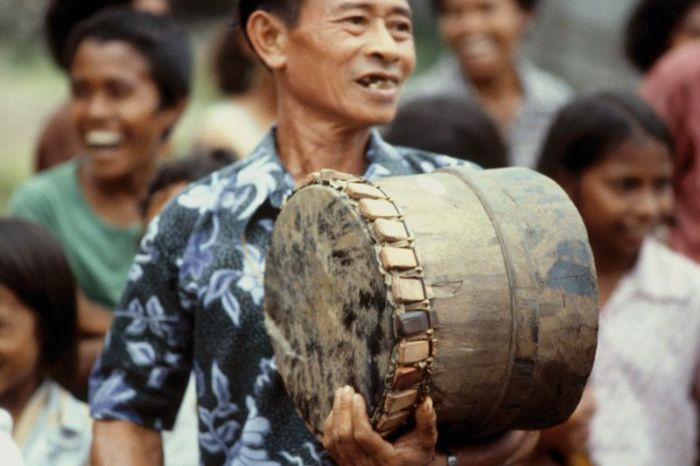
Musician playing drum during tug-of-war matches at Ullath,

Ullath is one of 18 villages on the island of Saparua in the province of Maluku, Indonesia. Ullath situated on the southeastern peninsula of Saparua along with Siri-sori Amalatu, Siri-sori Amapatti, and Ouw. It is most known for its cloves, fish, and sago. The current raja (or traditional village leader) is Abraham Nikijuluw.

Ullath consists of an area that is 6,8 km2, and has a total population of 1,478 people, which makes it the 10th largest village on the island.

== Religion ==
The majority of the people living in Ullath are Protestant Christian and they are part of the Syaloom congregation of the Protestant Church of Maluku.

Ullath is one of the original villages on the island and it is well known for its detailed records of the history of Maluku in general, including the fact that Ullath was the first village on the island of Saparua to be evangelized back in 1630, and was later followed by the village Booi.

== Family groups in Ullath ==
A unique feature in Ullath is the importance of the soa or "family group" which includes usually a community of several families. Traditionally there are 6 soa in Ullath.

- Soa Italili, which includes:
  - Supusepa
  - Manuputty
  - Pattipeilohy
- Soa Hatulessy, which includes:
  - Siwabessy
  - Lawalata
  - Manuputty
  - Maail
- Soa Putimahu, which includes:
  - Toumahuw
  - Manukiley
  - Litaay
- Soa Rumaila, which includes:
  - Telehala
  - Sapulette
  - Paais
  - Johannes
  - Manuhuttu
- Soa Soulisa, which includes:
  - Toisuta
  - Ahuluhelu
- Soa Raja, which includes:
  - Pical
  - Matheos
  - Parinussa
  - Manuputty
  - Latul

== Notable people from Ullath ==
- Johannes Latuharhary (July 6, 1900 – November 8, 1959) – the first governor of the province of Maluku
- Gerrit Augustinus Siwabessy (August 19, 1914 – November 11, 1982) – an Indonesian national hero
- Ellyas Pical – the first world boxing champion from Indonesia.
