= Mourão Municipal Chamber =

Legislative body of Mourão

Coordinates: 38.38336°N 7.34374°W

Mourão Municipal Chamber Câmara Municipal de Mourão
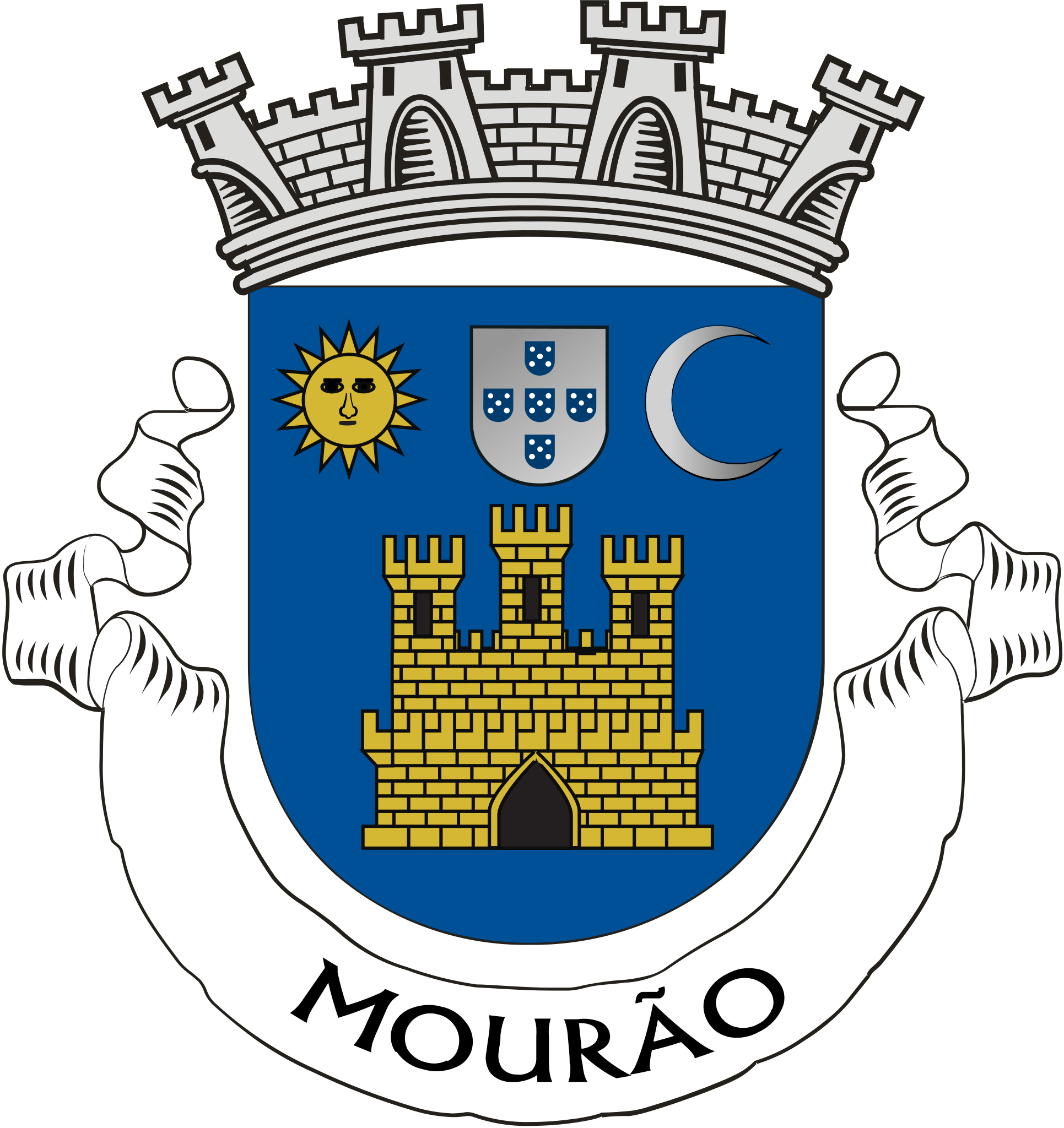
- Coat of arms of the town of Mourão

Type
- Type: Câmara municipal
- Term limits: 3

History
- Founded: 1296; 730 years ago

Leadership
- President: João Filipe Cardoso Fernandes Fortes, PSD since 20 October 2021
- Vice President: Maria Luísa Poupinha Ralo, PSD since 20 October 2021

Structure
- Seats: 5
- Political groups: Municipal Executive (3) PSD (3) Opposition (2) PS (2)
- Length of term: Four years

Elections
- Last election: 26 September 2021
- Next election: Sometime between 22 September and 14 October 2025

Meeting place
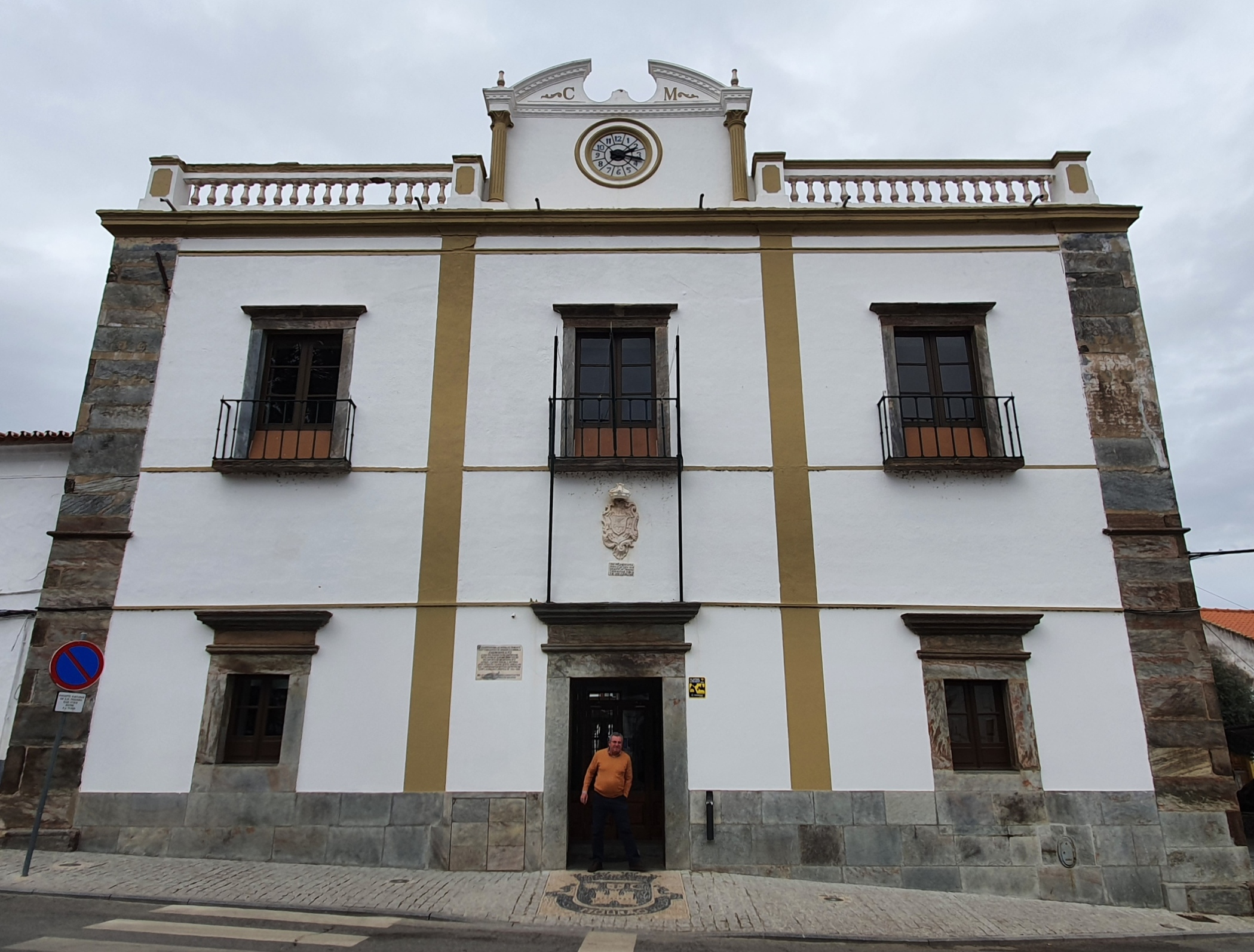
- Paços do Concelho de Mourão

Website
- www.cm-mourao.pt

The Mourão Municipal Chamber (Portuguese: Câmara Municipal de Mourão) is the administrative authority in the municipality of Mourão, in Portugal. It has 3 freguesias in its area of jurisdiction and is based in the town of Mourão, on the Évora District. These freguesias are: Granja; Luz and Mourão.

The Mourão City Council is made up of 5 councillors, representing, currently, two different political forces. The first candidate on the list with the most votes in a municipal election or, in the event of a vacancy, the next candidate on the list, takes office as President of the Municipal Chamber.

== List of the Presidents of the Municipal Chamber of Mourão ==
- Pedro Cominho Couto – (1976–1982)
- Alexandre Pinto Barros – (1982–1985)
- Jerónimo André Arranhado – (1985–1989)
- Alexandre Pinto Barros – (1989–1993)
- José Manuel Santinha Lopes – (1993–2013)
- Maria Clara Safara – (2013–2021)
- João Filipe Cardoso Fernandes Fortes – (2021–2025)

(The list is incomplete)
