= Castle of Mourão =

Coordinates: 38.3850°N 7.3467°W

- Castelo de Mourão
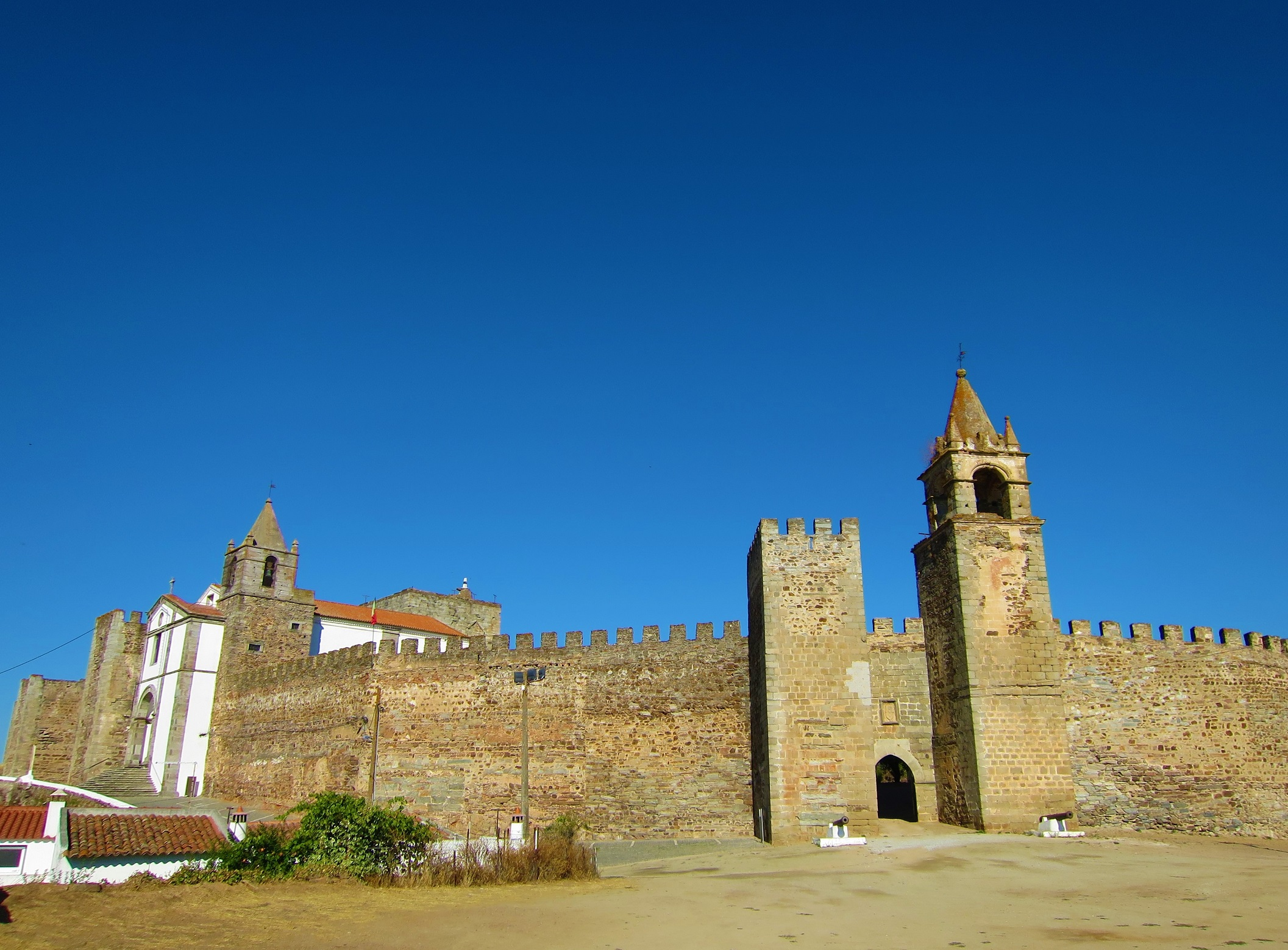

General information
- Type: Castle
- Architectural style: Gothic
- Location: Mourão, Portugal
- Construction started: reign of Sanchez II
- Owner: Government of Portugal

The Castle of Mourão (Portuguese: Castelo de Mourão) is a well-preserved castle in the town of Mourão, Portugal. It is classified by IGESPAR (the Portuguese government) as a Site of Public Interest.

== History ==
=== Early history ===
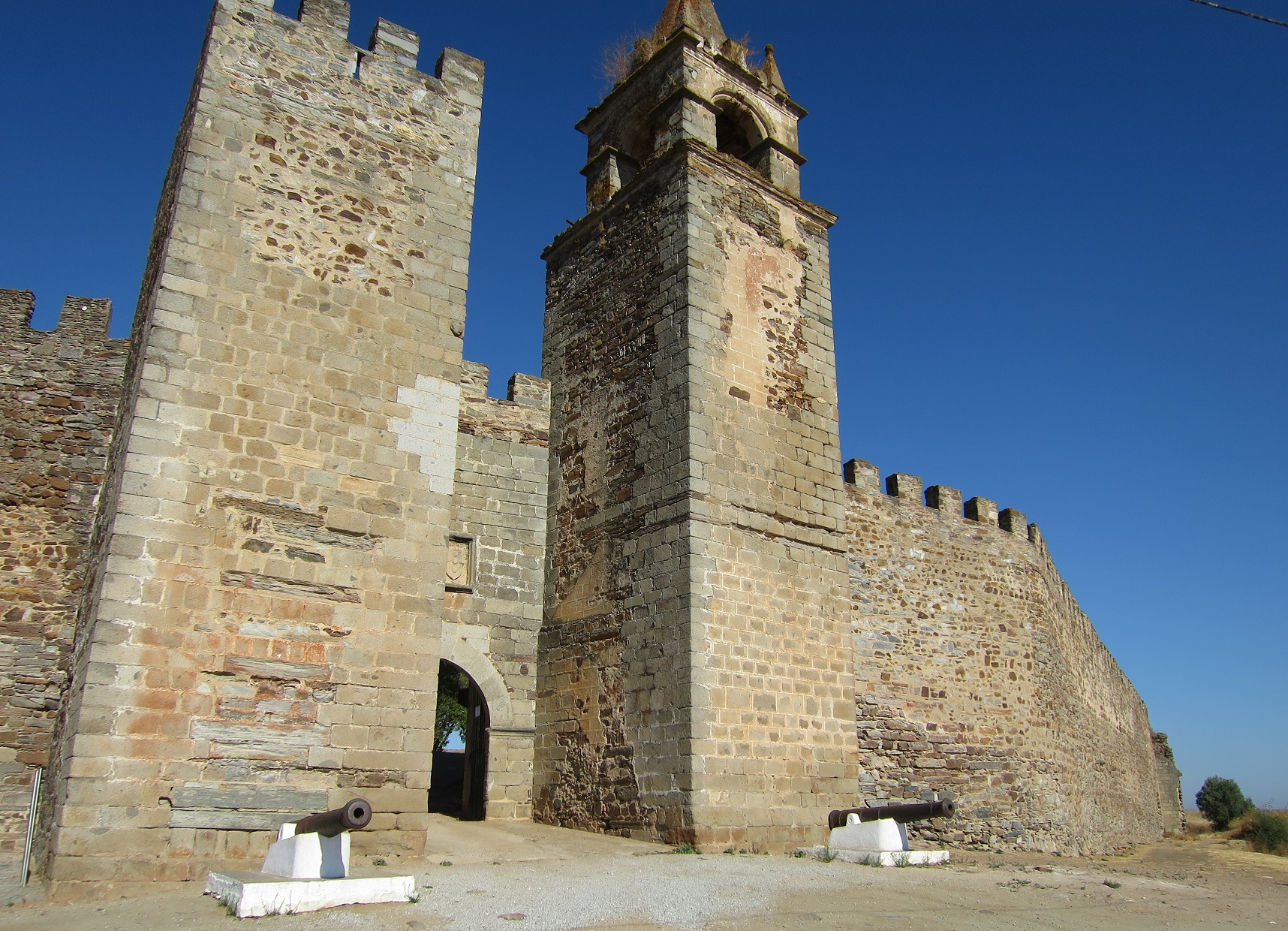
Entrance to the castle

Little is known about the early occupation of this site. During the Christian reconquest of the Iberian Peninsula, the area surrounding the castle was the scene of a few clashes between Muslims and Christians.

=== Medieval history ===
Before the Portuguese conquest of the region, the fields were donated to the Knights Hospitaller. They were first brought under the control of Gonçalo Egas, having been granted a Foral charter to the town aiming to encourage their settlement and defense in 1226. A will date from this period under the reign of Sancho II (1223–1248), directing the reconstruction of the fortification.

A Foral charter was granted to the town by King Afonso III (1248–1279) in 1254.

Under the reign of King Dinis (1279–1325), the village received a new charter. in 1296, confirmed in 1298. During this period, the original castle was renovated, increasing to three towers.

=== Habsburgs dynasty to modern day ===
During the 1383–85 Interregnum crisis, the village suffered one attack and took refuge in the castle. It was relieved by forces of the Order of Aviz.

In 1580, the castle was brought under Habsburg control when Portugal joined Spain in the Iberian Union.

The castle is considered a Public Interest Property by decree on July 18, 1957. Since it is in well conserved condition, the castle is a tourist attraction for the community.

== Characteristics ==
The castle was constructed during the Middle Ages, built with a combination of shale stone, marble and granite. It is reinforced by six quadrangular towers. The doors and towers are influenced by Gothic architecture.

The renovations of the seventeenth century involved fixing the bastions at the corner of the walls and ravelins in front of the curtains.

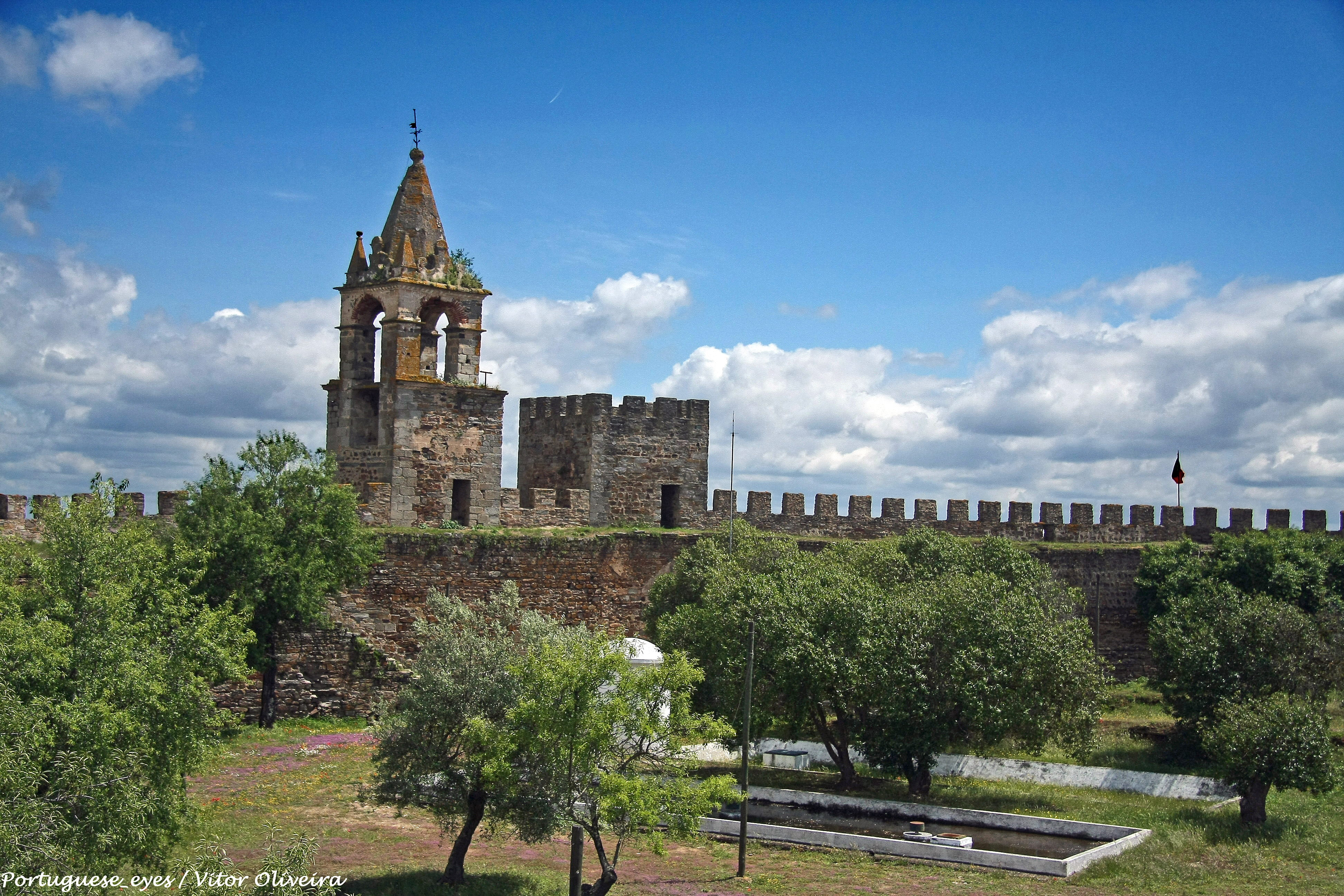
Interior of the castle and one of the towers

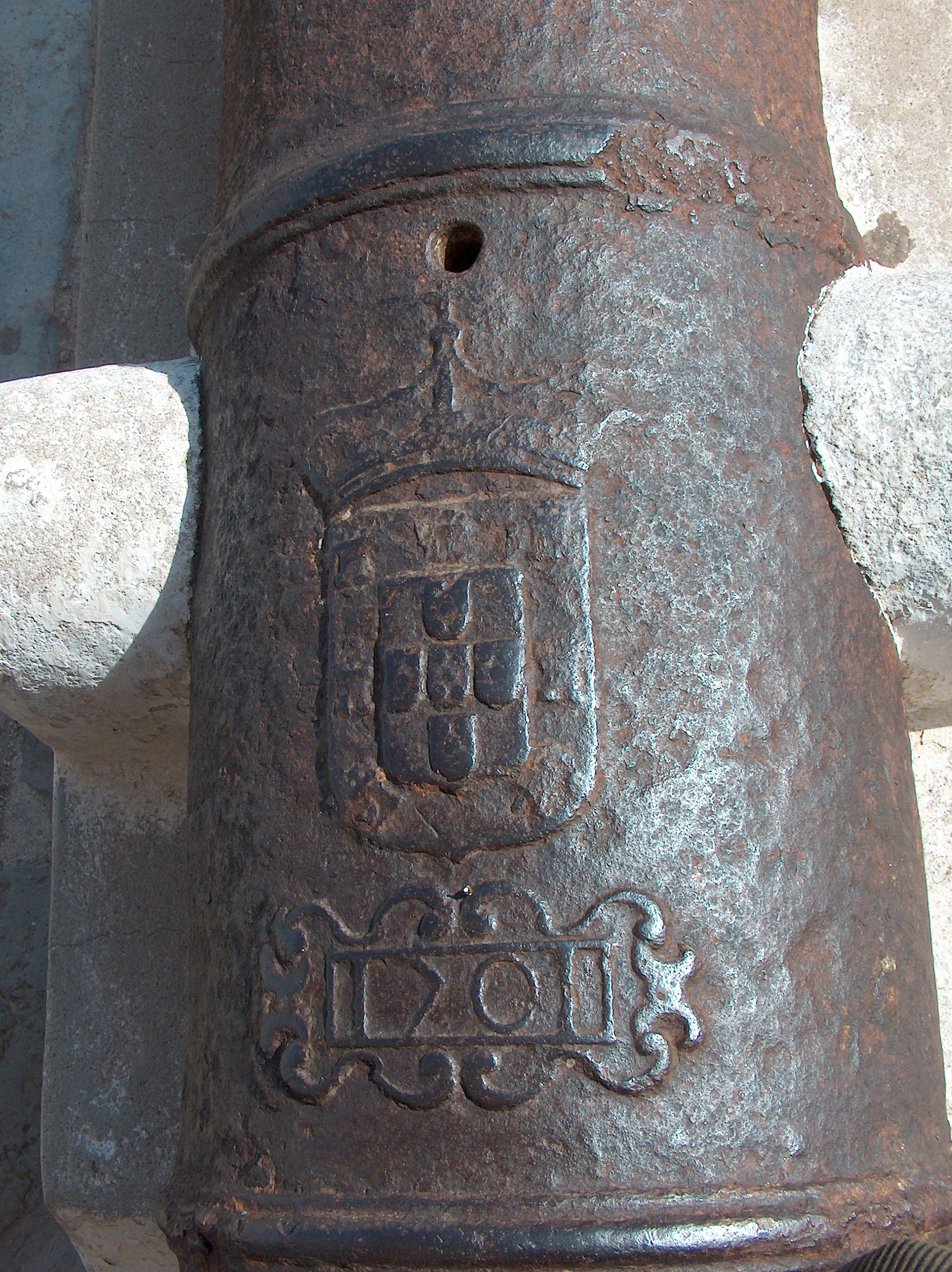
Cannon at the entrance
