= Muhammad Djosan =

Indonesian bureaucrat

Sutan Muhammad Djosan gelar Sutan Bidjo Radjo
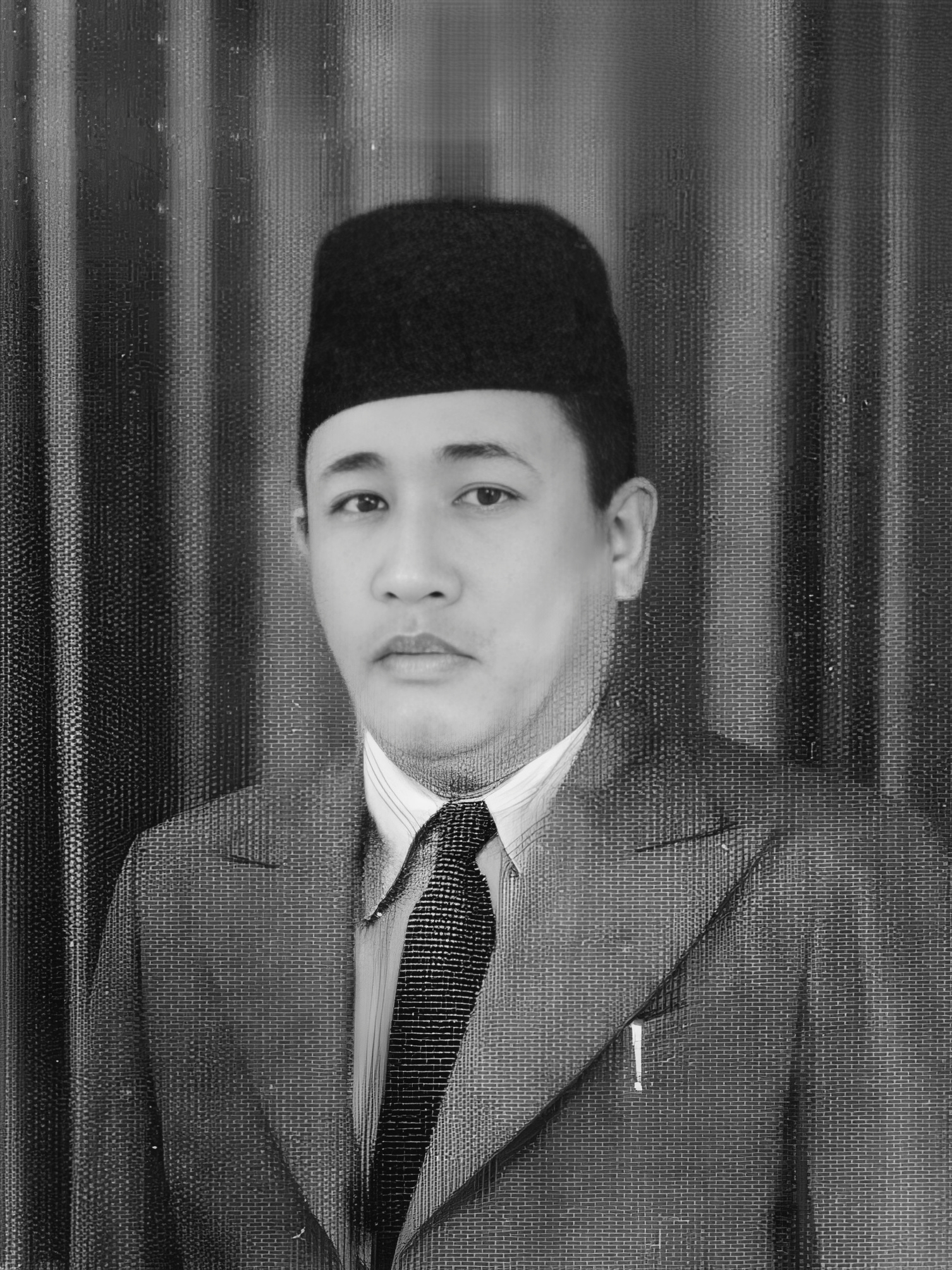

Governor of Maluku
- In office 9 February 1955 – 1960; Acting until 6 January 1956
- Preceded by: Johannes Latuharhary
- Succeeded by: Muhammad Padang

Personal details
- Born: November 8, 1906
- Died: February 20, 1988 (aged 81)
- Party: Socialist Party of Indonesia (before 1955); Nahdlatul Ulama (after 1955)

Sutan Muhammad Djosan gelar Sutan Bidjo Radjo (8 November 1906 – 20 February 1988) was an Indonesian bureaucrat. He was the Governor of Maluku from 1955 until 1960.

== Bureaucratic career ==
Muhammad Djosan was born on 8 November 1906. He started working as a bureaucrat during the Dutch East Indies era. From the 1920s to the 1930s, Djosan held several offices in the Sumatran West Coast government, such as deputy prosecutor in the Fort de Kock District Court and assistant district chief of Bajang.

Following the Indonesian independence, Djosan joined the newly formed Indonesian government and was involved in the bureaucracy. He was appointed as the acting head of the Agam Underdistrict on 8 October 1945, a week after the formation of the West Sumatra Government. A year later, on 17 May 1946, Djosan was appointed as the chief inspector of the civil servant salary council. Aside from his position in the bureaucracy, Djosan was also involved with negotiations between the Indonesian and the Dutch forces in early January 1947.

Djosan was appointed as the Resident of Ambon following the recognition of Indonesian in 1950. During this period, Djosan oversaw interfaith discussion between Muslims and Christians in the region as well as the replacement of the regent of Central Maluku.

== Governor of Maluku ==
=== Appointment ===
Djosan was appointed as the acting governor of Maluku on 1 February 1955 after the previous governor, Johannes Latuharhary, was removed from his post due to pressures from the Indonesian National Party (PNI) and Masyumi Party. Latuharhary handed over his post to Djosan a few weeks later on 9 February. As a member of the Socialist Party of Indonesia (PSI) during this period, Djosan was nominated as the topmost candidate for the party in Maluku for the Constitutional Assembly, but was not elected.

The selection of a definitive governor were going underway while Djosan served his acting governor. Several names, such as Pieter Andreas de Queljoe, Mohammad Padang, and dr. Rehatta were nominated to become the definitive governor. Masyumi and the Indonesian Christian Party (Parkindo), who emerged victorious in the 1955 elections, made an agreement that the governor should be of Moluccan ethnicity and that if the governor is a Christian, his secretary should be a Muslim and vice versa. Masyumi named Abdullah Soulisa, former regent of Central Maluku, as their candidate, while Parkindo named Martinus Putuhena, Johannes Leimena, and M. A. Pellaupessy.

Djosan, who moved to the Nahdlatul Ulama (NU) party after his nomination as governor, stated that the next governor should be unaffiliated to any political party and requested himself to be put in the bottom of the nomination list. The interior minister, a NU member, eventually chose Djosan over other candidates at a cabinet session on 25 November 1955 and installed Djosan as definitive governor on 6 January 1956. Four years after that, Djosan ended his term as governor in 1960.

=== Reactions ===
The appointment of Djosan was criticized by PNI, Parkindo, and Masyumi. PNI refused to recognize Djosan's governorship, while Parkindo and Masyumi considered Djosan as breaking their consensus regarding the ethnicity of the governor. Masyumi's newspaper in Maluku, Tifa, printed statements from various parties in Maluku who disagreed with the appointment of Djosan as governor on the front page and doubted the interior minister's impartiality in the selection process for the governor of Maluku. Parkindo, on the other hand, requested the central government to appoint more native civil servants for the Moluccan government. PSI was the only party alongside NU who supported Djosan's governorship and attempted to convene a meeting in order to rally support for Djosan, but the meeting ended with no meaningful result. Djosan also initiated the establishment of NU branch in Ambon, the capital of Maluku, which provoked further resentment from Masyumi and Parkindo.

In response to the criticism, the interior minister stated that Djosan was "upright, competent and experienced in administrative matters" and "dare to act and take the initiative". The minister also explained his reason as to not appointing the other candidates offered. He said that Queljoe had no experience in government matters, while Putuhena and Rehatta refused to held office.
