= 2024 Maluku gubernatorial election =

- 27 November 2024
- Turnout: 70.55% (▲1.43pp)
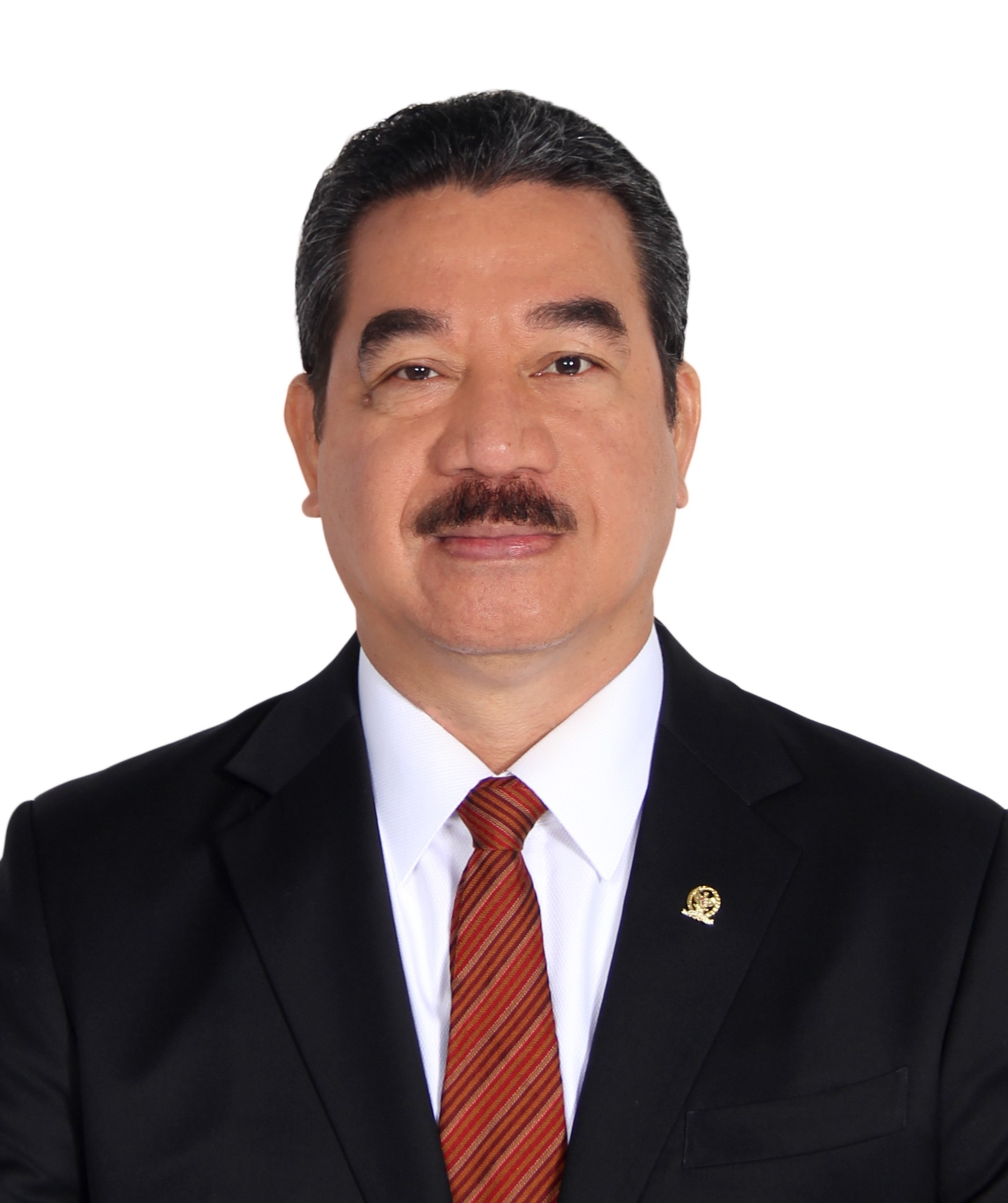

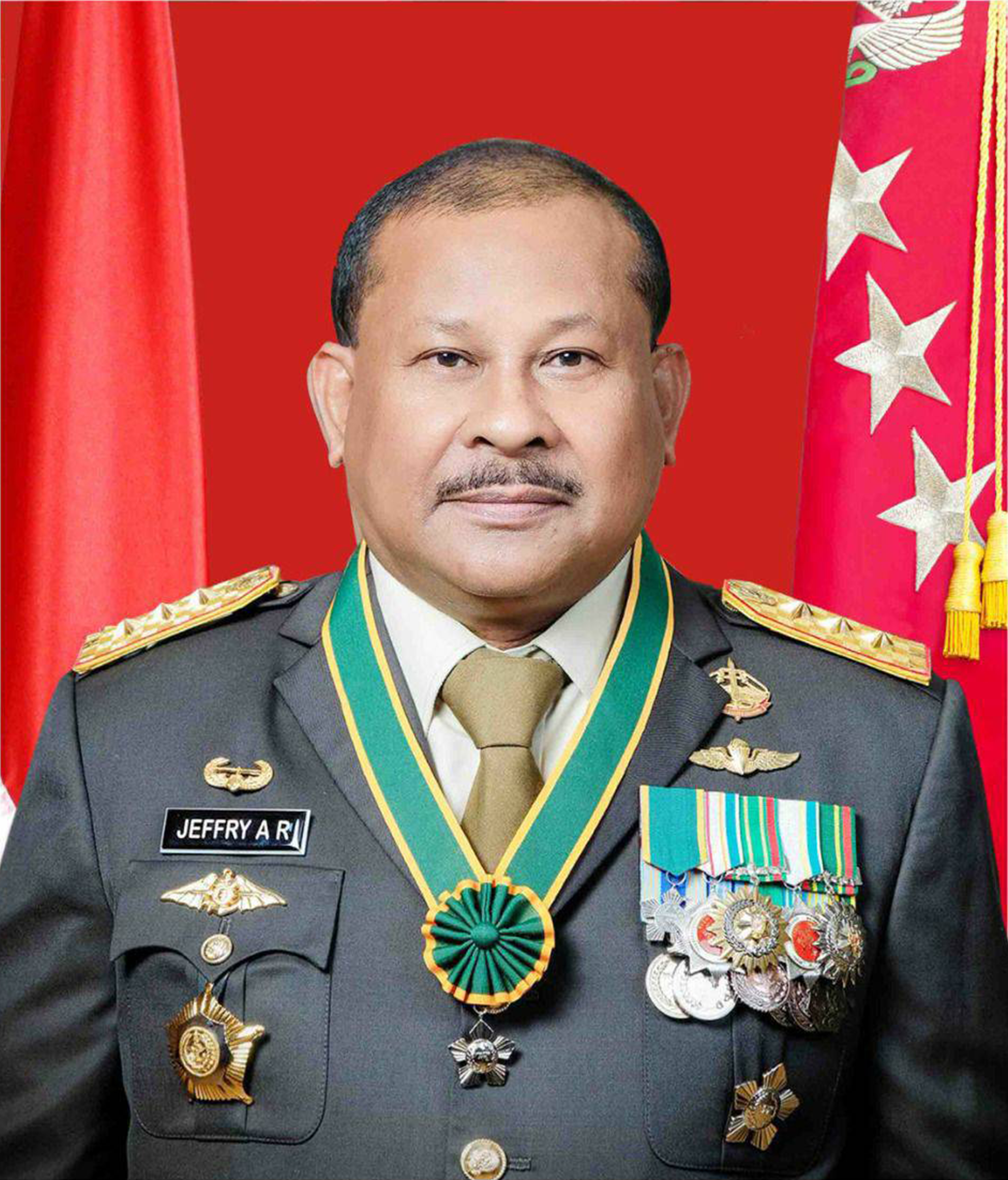

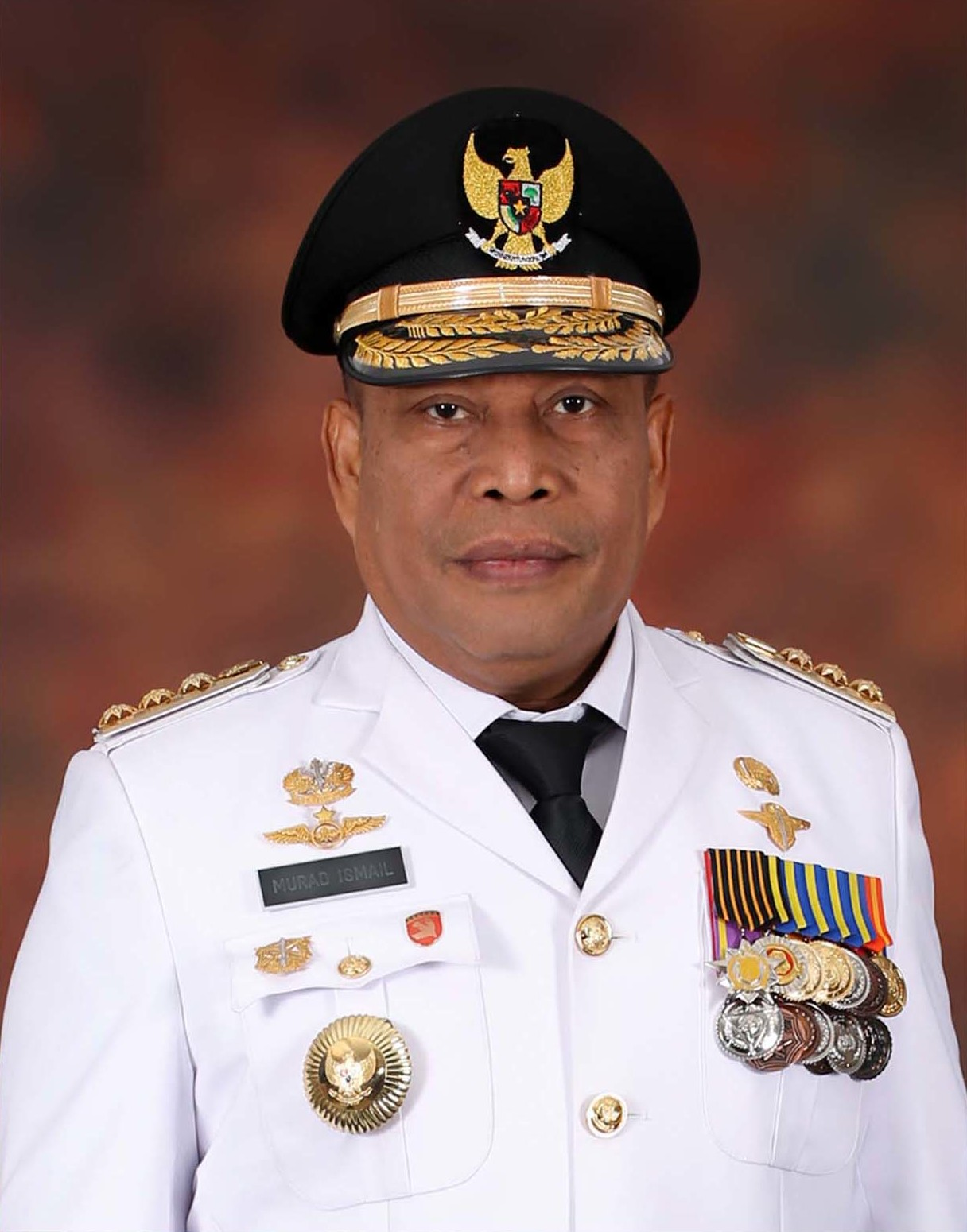
Candidate	Hendrik Lewerissa	Jeffry Apoly Rahawarin	Murad Ismail
Party	Gerindra	PDI-P	PAN
Alliance	KIM Plus	–	–
Running mate	Abdullah Vanath	Abdul Mukti Keliobas	Michael Wattimena
Popular vote	437,379	249,013	236,377
Percentage	47.40%	26.99%	25.62%
- Results by district
Governor before election
Sadali Ie (acting)
Independent
Elected Governor
Hendrik Lewerissa
Gerindra

The 2024 Maluku gubernatorial election was held on 27 November 2024 as part of nationwide local elections to elect the governor of Maluku for a five-year term. The previous election was held in 2018. The election was won by Hendrik Lewerissa of the Gerindra Party with 47% of the vote. Jeffry Apoly Rahawarin of the Indonesian Democratic Party of Struggle (PDI-P) placed second, receiving 26%. Former Governor Murad Ismail of the National Mandate Party (PAN) placed third with 25%.

== Electoral system ==
The election, like other local elections in 2024, follow the first-past-the-post system where the candidate with the most votes wins the election, even if they do not win a majority. It is possible for a candidate to run uncontested, in which case the candidate is still required to win a majority of votes "against" an "empty box" option. Should the candidate fail to do so, the election will be repeated on a later date.

== Candidates ==
According to electoral regulations, in order to qualify for the election, candidates were required to secure support from a political party or a coalition of parties controlling 9 seats in the Maluku Regional House of Representatives (DPRD). As no parties won 9 or more seats in the 2024 legislative election, all parties must form coalitions to nominate candidates. Candidates may alternatively demonstrate support in form of photocopies of identity cards, which in Maluku's case corresponds to 134,102 copies. No such candidates registered prior to the deadline set by the General Elections Commission (KPU).

=== Potential ===
The following are individuals who have either been publicly mentioned as a potential candidate by a political party in the DPRD, publicly declared their candidacy with press coverage, or considered as a potential candidate by media outlets:

- Murad Ismail, previous governor.
- Barnabas Orno, previous vice governor.
- Jeffry Apoly Rahawarin, former commander of the Maluku-based Kodam XV/Pattimura.
- Hendrik Lewerissa (Gerindra), member of the House of Representatives).

== Political map ==
Following the 2024 Indonesian legislative election, eleven political parties are represented in the Maluku DPRD:

Political parties	Seat count
Indonesian Democratic Party of Struggle (PDI-P)	8 / 45
NasDem Party	6 / 45
Great Indonesia Movement Party (Gerindra)	5 / 45
Party of Functional Groups (Golkar)	4 / 45
National Awakening Party (PKB)	4 / 45
Prosperous Justice Party (PKS)	4 / 45
Democratic Party (Demokrat)	4 / 45
National Mandate Party (PAN)	3 / 45
People's Conscience Party (Hanura)	3 / 45
United Development Party (PPP)	2 / 45
Perindo Party	2 / 45

== Results ==
Candidate	Running mate	Party	Votes	%
Hendrik Lewerissa	Abdullah Vanath	Gerindra Party	437,379	47.40
Jeffry Apoly Rahawarin	Abdul Mukti Keliobas	Indonesian Democratic Party of Struggle	249,013	26.99
Murad Ismail	Michael Wattimena	National Mandate Party	236,377	25.62
Total			922,769	100.00
Valid votes			922,769	98.19
Invalid/blank votes			17,021	1.81
Total votes			939,790	100.00
Registered voters/turnout			1,332,149	70.55
Source: KPU

Candidate vote share by district
Jeffry–Mukti

Murad–Michael

Hendrik–Vanath
