= Muradian =

Muradian is a surname. Notable people with the surname include:

- David Muradian (born 1982), American politician
- Gregory Muradian (1939–1989), American actor
- Vago Muradian, American journalist, son of Vazgen
- Vazgen Muradian (1921–2018), Armenian-American composer

== See also ==
- Muradyan
