= Murad Khan =

Murad Khan may refer to:

- Murād Khan (1361–1363), Khan of at least part of the Golden Horde
- Nasreddin Murat-Khan (1904–1970), Russian-born Pakistani architect
