= Sergey Muratov =

Sergey Muratov may refer to:

- Sergey Muratov (footballer) (1948–2008), Russian association football player and coach
- Sergey Muratov (politician) (born 1964), Russian politician
