= Muradyan =

Muradyan (Armenian: Մուրադյան) is a surname originating in Armenia. It may also refer to:

- Badal Muradyan (1915–1991), Chairman of the Council of Ministers of Soviet Armenia (1966–1972)
- Eliza Muradyan (born 1993), Armenian-Russian model and beauty pageant titleholder
- Gohar Muradyan (born 1957), Armenian philologist and translator
- Hrach Muradyan (born 1983), Armenian television host, producer and public figure
- Igor Muradyan (1957–2018), Armenian political activist
- Karen Muradyan (born 1992), Armenian footballer
- Nina Muradyan (born 1954), Soviet volleyball player
- Romeo Muradyan (born 1979), Armenian actor
- Ruben Muradyan (born 1989), Armenian ballet dancer, presenter and actor
- Rudolf Muradyan (born 1936), Soviet and Armenian theoretical physicist
- Sergey Muradyan (born 2004), Armenian football player
