= Mrad =

Mrad or MRAD may refer to:

== People ==
- Abdul Rahim Mrad (born 1942), Lebanese politician and former government minister
- Antón Arrufat Mrad (born 1935), Cuban dramatist, novelist, short story writer, poet and essayist
- Imen Mrad (born 1992), Tunisian footballer
- Matthias Mrad (born 1969), Lebanese Syriac Catholic bishop
- Shlomi Mrad (born 1989), Israeli footballer
- Mrad Mahjoub (born 1945), Tunisian football manager

== Other uses ==
- abbreviation of milliradian (mrad), a unit of angle
- abbreviation of megaradian (Mrad), a unit of angle
- abbreviation of millirad (mrad), a unit of radiation dose
- abbreviation of megarad (Mrad), a unit of radiation dose
- Barrett MRAD, a bolt-action sniper rifle

== See also ==
- Béchara Abou Mrad (1853–1930), Lebanese Melkite priest and monk
- Joseph Abou Mrad (1933–2003), Lebanese football player and manager
- Bchira Ben Mrad (1913–1993), Tunisian women's rights activist
- Mehdi Ben Mrad (born 1998), Tunisian football goalkeeper
- Mohamed Salah Ben Mrad (1881–1979), Tunisian theologian, journalist and intellectual
