= Otabek Murodov =

Uzbek politician

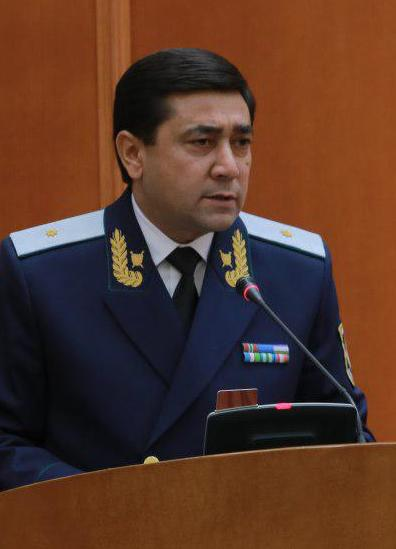

Prosecutor General of Uzbekistan
- In office 2018–2019
- Preceded by: Ikhtiyor Abdullayev
- Succeeded by: Nigmatilla Yuldashev

Personal details
- Born: April 6, 1975 (age 50); Yakkabog District, Uzbek SSR, Soviet Union

Otabek Bahriddinovich Murodov (Uzbek: Отабек Бахритдинович Муродов; born, April 6, 1975) is an Uzbek statesman and politician who was the Prosecutor General of Uzbekistan from 2018 to 2019 and State Adviser.

== Early life and career ==
Otabek Murodov was born on April 6, 1975, in the Yakkabog, Yakkabog District, Uzbek SSR. In 1992 he graduated from A.S.Pushkin Secondary School No. 3 in Shakhrisabz. In 1989-1991 he headed the youth organization of the school. In 1992, he entered the Faculty of International Legal Relations of the Tashkent Law Institute (now the university), from which he graduated and a PhD in Law in 1997. He started his career in 1997 as an intern of the prosecutor's office of Shahrisabz District.

From 1997 through the mid‑2000s, he served in various roles within district and regional prosecutor offices, gradually rising in rank. In 2005, he transitioned to the presidential administration, focusing on issues including counter‑terrorism, citizenship, and judicial oversight.

He remained in this position until 2015, when he became the State Adviser to the President of the Republic of Uzbekistan on interaction with the Oliy Majlis, public and political organizations until 2017. From 2017 to 2018 he acted as the State Adviser of the President of the Republic of Uzbekistan on political and legal issues until becoming the Prosecutor General of the Republic of Uzbekistan in 2018, where he was in office until 2019. During his tenure, he addressed institutional issues in specialized educational institutions, advocating for reforms and increased oversight to protect minors from abuse.

== Awards ==
By the Decree of the President of the Republic of Uzbekistan dated August 28, 2002, he was awarded the "Jasorat Medal".

== Arrest ==
On June 20, 2019, he was dismissed from the position of the prosecutor general and was involved in the investigation in the framework of the case of the former prosecutor general, Ikhtiyor Abdullayev. He was imprisoned on September 18.

On February 25, 2020, by the decree of the military court of the Republic of Uzbekistan, the sentence of imprisonment for a period of 5 years was appointed.
