= Romeo Muradyan =

Armenian actor (born 1979)

- Born: January 9, 1979 (age 47); Tbilisi, Georgia
- Occupation: Actor
- Years active: 1995–present

Romeo Muradyan (Armenian: Ռոմեո Մուրադյան; born 1979) is an Armenian actor best known for playing Edgar on the Armenian TV Series Don't Be Afraid and as Ludovic on the theater play God Bless You. In 2020, he played the role of Rustam in the Armenian TV series Anatolian Story.

== Biography ==
Muradyan was born in Tbilisi, Georgia to Armenian parents. He has a sister. He began his career in 1995, aged 16, when he appeared in the theater play Scandal in Avlabar. In 1998 he graduated from drama school at the Tbilisi State Armenian Drama Theater. From 1998 to 2012, he worked as an actor Tbilisi State Armenian Drama Theatre. He worked in the theater of Fame Stepanian. In 2012, he moved to Paris, France where his sister lived since 2009. He is fluent in Armenian, Georgian, Russian and a little French.

== Personal life ==
On September 23, 2000, Romeo married Alina Muradyan (née Tumasyan). They have two boys: Hamlet (b. October 31, 2003), Giorgi (b. September 18, 2009) and a girl Rosalie (b. January 15, 2016). His eldest son was in the Armenian film The Open Door (Դուռը Բաց) in 2011.

== Filmography ==
=== Movie and television ===
- 2006 : Don't Be Afraid (Մի Վախեցիր) : Edgar
- 2006 : The Bullet Paper (ქაღალდის ტყვია) : Seroj
- 2009 : Independence (დამუკიდებლობის) : Communist of Armenia
- 2020 : Anatolian Story (Անատոլիական պատմություն) : Rustam (recurring role, 5 episodes)

=== Theater ===
- 1995 : Scandal in Avlabar : Sako
- 1996 : Grooms my daughter: Aram / Armen
- 1997 : The Passion of Artashes : Warrior
- 1998 : The Love Mount: Vagan
- 1999-2000 : Initially, died, then got married: Sergo
- Unknown year : Carnival : Goat
- Unknown year : Picnic : Sapo
- Unknown year : Uncle Baghdasar : Oksen
- Unknown year : Eastern Dentist : Markar
- Unknown year : The Indictment : Gigla Meburashvili
- Unknown year : Christmas in The House Kupello : Ninilo
- 2005 : God Bless You !: Ludovic (in Tbilissi)
- 2014 : God Bless You !: Ludovic (in Paris)
