= Mourão =

- Municipality
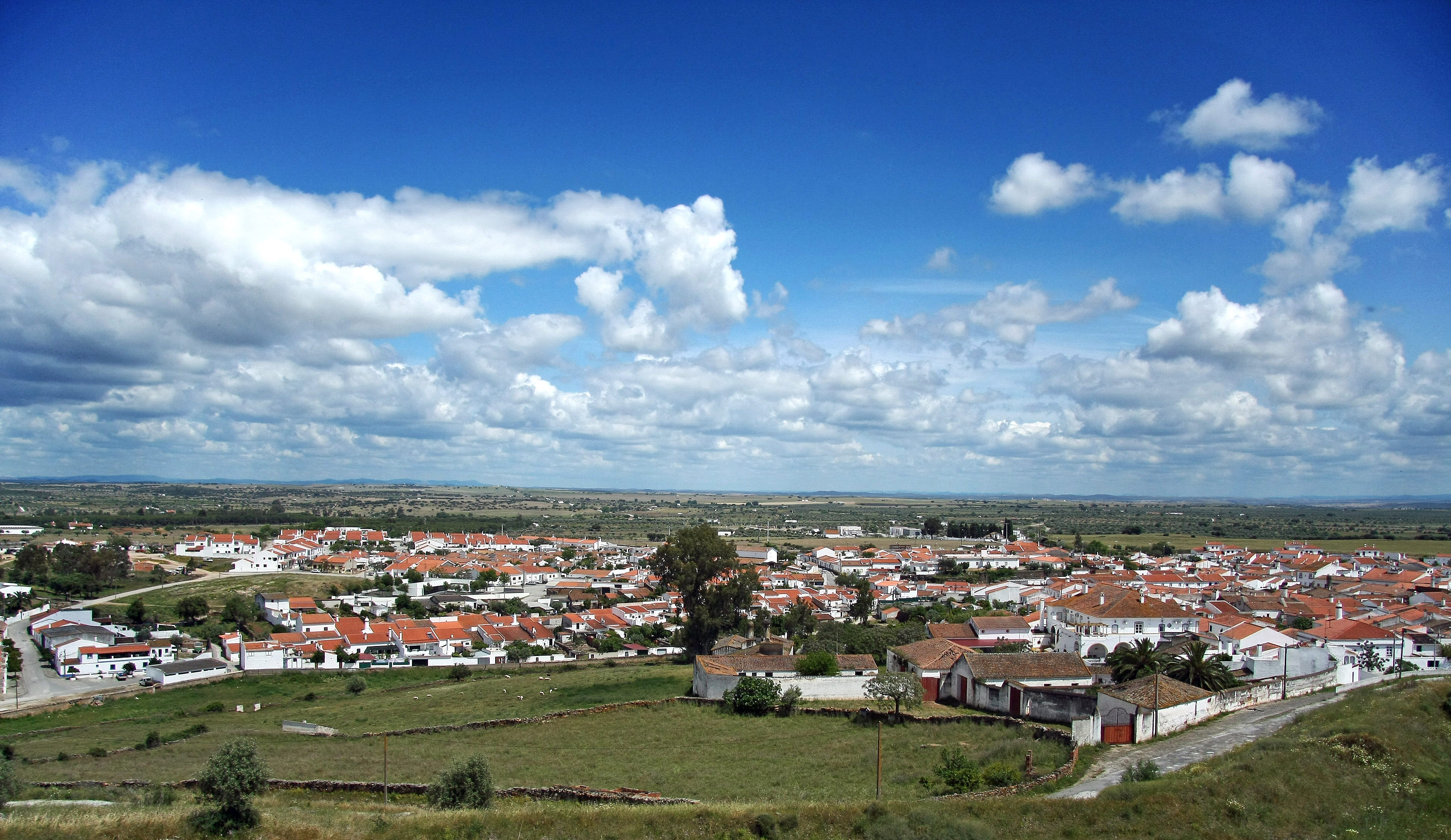

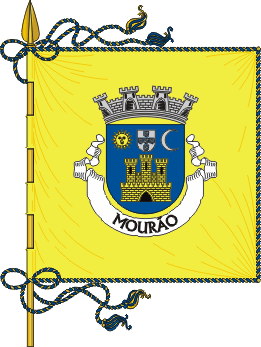
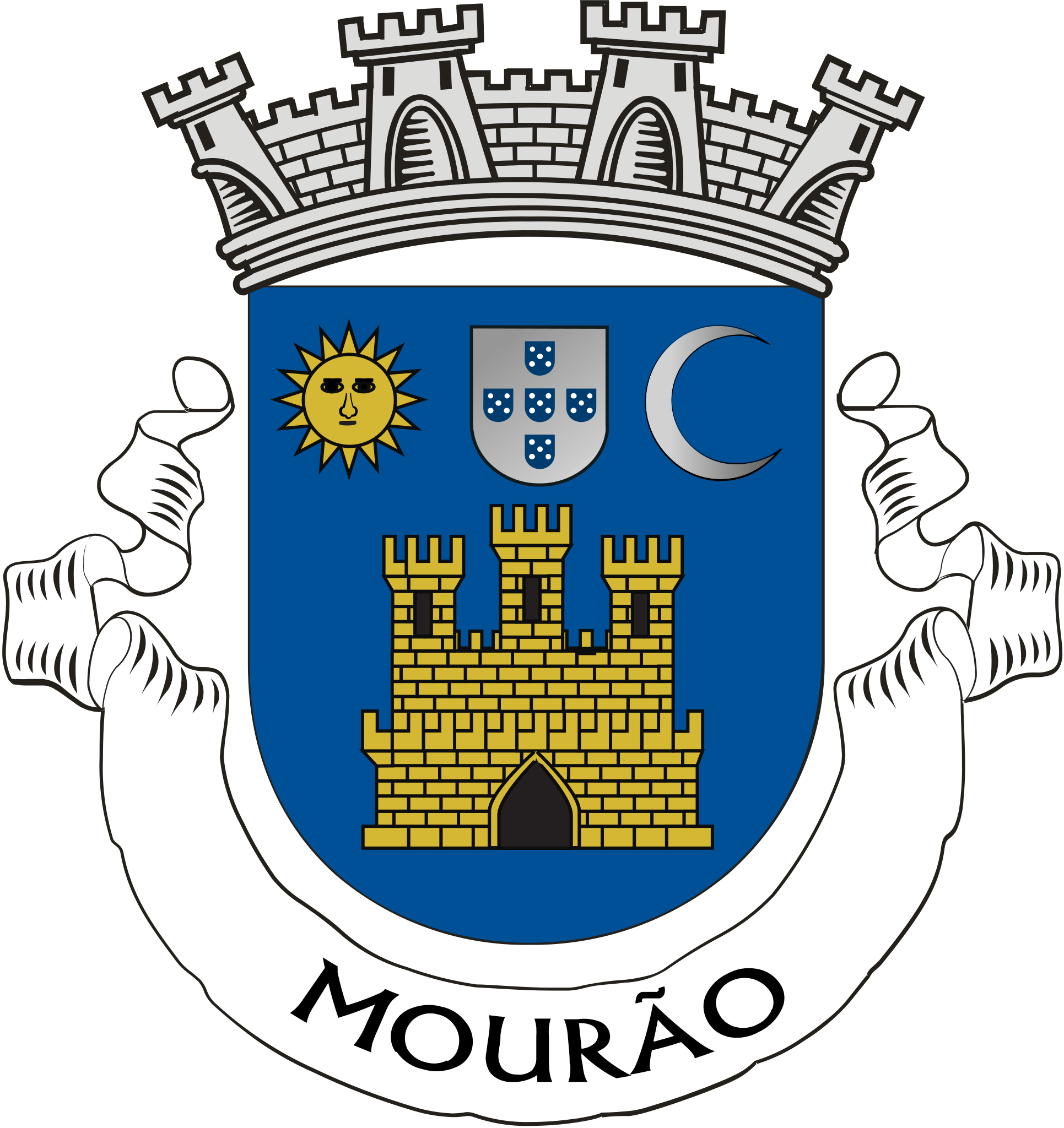
- Flag Coat of arms
- Interactive map of Mourão
- Coordinates: 38°20′N 7°22′W
- Country: Portugal
- Region: Alentejo
- Intermunic. comm.: Alentejo Central
- District: Évora
- Seat: Mourão Municipal Chamber
- Parishes: 3

Government
  - President: João Fortes (PSD)

Area
  - Total: 278.63 km^{2} (107.58 sq mi)

Population (2011)
  - Total: 2,663
  - Density: 9.557/km^{2} (24.75/sq mi)
- Time zone: UTC+00:00 (WET)
  - Summer (DST): UTC+01:00 (WEST)
- Local holiday: February 2
- Website: www.cm-mourao.pt

Mourão (pronounced [moˈɾɐ̃w]) is a municipality in the District of Évora in Portugal. The population in 2011 was 2,663, in an area of 278.63 km^{2}.

== Geography ==
The municipality borders the municipality of Alandroal to the north, Spain to the east, Barrancos to the south-east, Moura to the south and Reguengos de Monsaraz to the east.

The town has the well-preserved Castle of Mourão.

== Gallery ==
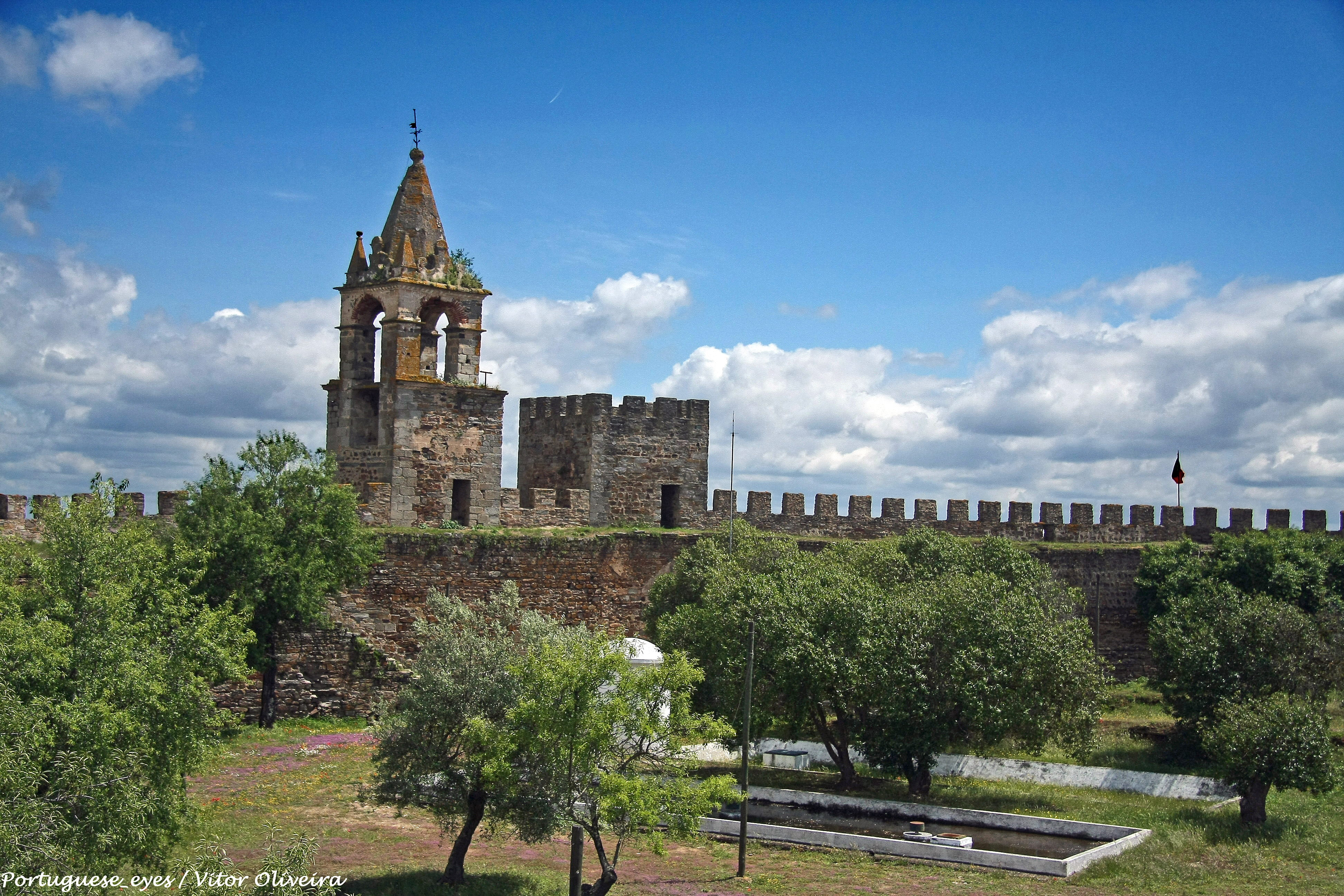
Mourão Castle

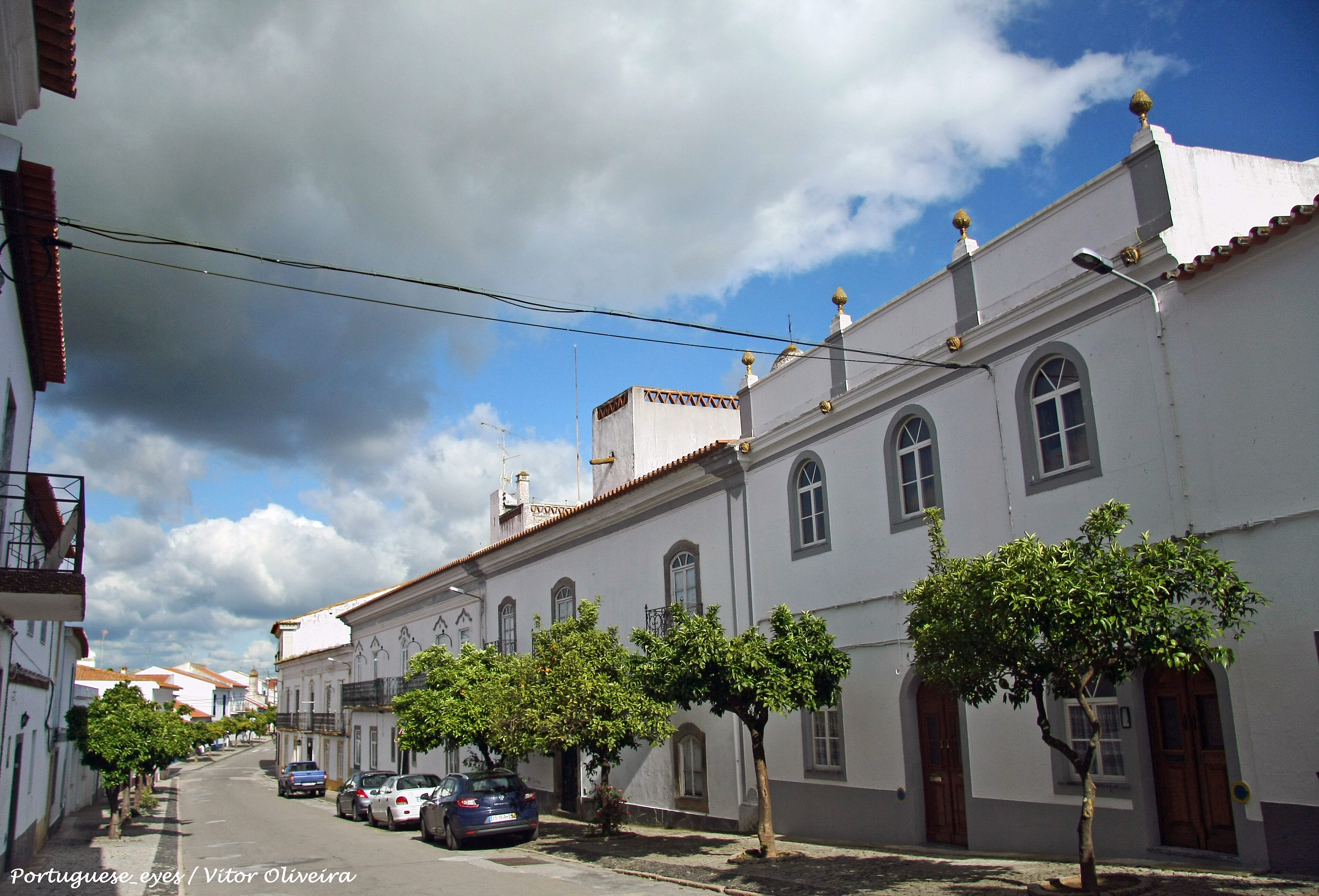
Street in Mourão

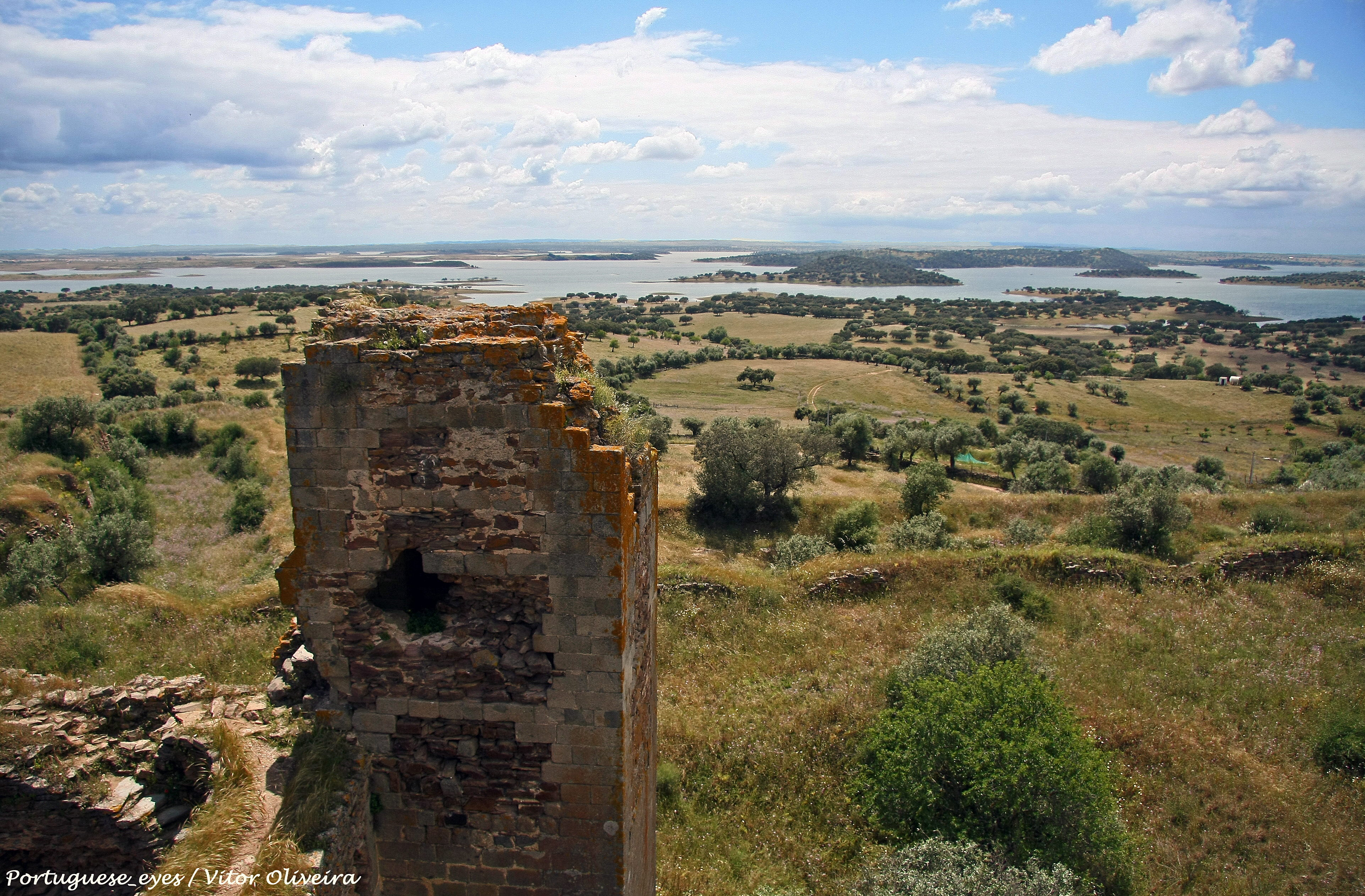
View of the Alqueva Dam from the castle

== Politics ==
The present Mayor is João Fortes, elected in 2021 by a coalition between PSD and CDS-PP. The municipal holiday is February 2.

== Parishes ==
Administratively, the municipality is divided into 3 civil parishes (freguesias):

- Granja
- Luz
- Mourão

== Notable people ==
- Hernâni Neves (born 1963) a retired Portuguese footballer and beach soccer player, known as Hernâni.

== See also ==
- Granja Amareleja IPR
