= Murad Ismail (politician) =

Governor of Maluku, Indonesia

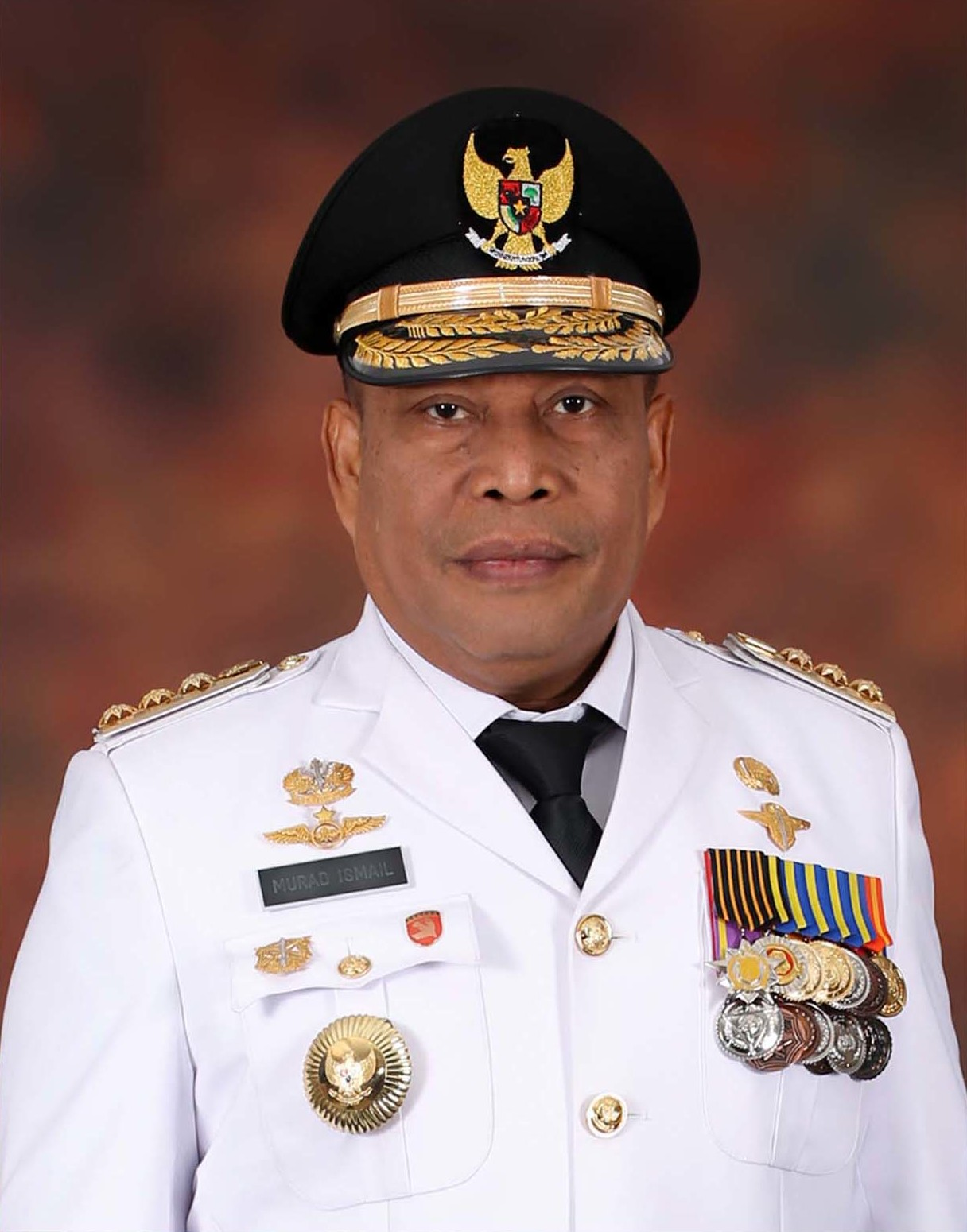

13th Governor of Maluku
- In office 24 April 2019 – 24 April 2024
- President: Joko Widodo
- Deputy: Barnabas Orno
- Preceded by: Said Assagaff; Hamim bin Tahir
- Succeeded by: Sadali Ie (act.); Hendrik Lewerissa

Commander of the Police Mobile Brigade Corps
- In office 31 December 2015 – 5 Januari 2018
- Preceded by: Robby Kaligis
- Succeeded by: Rudy Sufahriadi

Maluku Regional Police Chief
- In office 15 December 2013 – 31 December 2015
- Preceded by: Muktiono
- Succeeded by: Ilham Salahudin

Deputy Chief of the Maluku Regional Police
- In office April 2013 – 15 December 2013
- Preceded by: Herry Prastowo
- Succeeded by: Musa Ginting

Personal details
- Born: September 11, 1961 (age 65) Waihaong, Nusaniwe, Ambon, Maluku, Indonesia
- Party: Independent (from 2023)
- Other political affiliations: PDIP (until May 2023)
- Spouse: Widya Pratiwi
- Children: 4
- Education: Police Academy (1985)

Military service
- Allegiance: Indonesia
- Branch/service: Indonesian National Police
- Years of service: 1985—2018
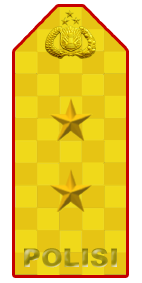
- Rank: Inspector General of Police
- Unit: Mobile Brigade

Murad Ismail (born 11 September 1961) is an Indonesian politician and former policeman who served as the Governor of Maluku between April 2019 and April 2024. Prior to becoming governor, Murad was a retired high-ranking National Police officer who became the Police Inspector General.

== Early life and education ==
He was born to a simple family in Waihaong, Ambon City on September 11, 1961. He studied elementary school in 1974, junior high school in 1977 and high school in 1981 in Ambon. After graduating from high school, he immediately entered the Indonesian National Police Academy and graduated in 1985.

== Policing career ==
After graduating from the Police Academy, Murad who held the rank of Police Inspector 2nd Class, and was assigned to the Central Sulawesi police as Platoon Commander of the KIE 5153 Central Sulawesi Police (Note: At the time, Central Sulawesi did not have a Regional Police, and was still under the North Sulawesi Regional Police under the name Polda Sulutteng, Kie 5153 is now the North Sulawesi Police Mobile Brigade Unit) on 3 November 1985.

On 7 April 1988, he became Head of Sub-Department of Hartib, (Note: Hartib is an acronym for pemeliharaan ketertiban, which roughly translate to maintenance of order) then Head of Sub-Department of Investigation Development and Head of Sub-Section for Operations Bureau Investigation at the Central Sulawesi Police.

On 28 February 1994, Murad was assigned to the Moluccan Police Mobile Brigade Headquarters with the position of company commander of Police Mobile Brigade 5154 Maluku Regional Police and on 5 August 1996, Murad became the Deputy Chief of the Police Mobile Brigade Task Force for East Timor.

After the operation in Timor, on 2 April 1997, Murad was appointed battalion commander B Regiment I Pioneer. And on 28 December 1998 became detachment commander B Regiment II Gegana of the Indonesian National Police. On 2 January 2006, Murad was promoted to Head of Mobile Brigade for North Sumatra Police. And on 23 October 2008, Murad was promoted again to Head of Mobile Brigade Head of Regional Police of Metro Jaya.

After being the Head of Police Mobile Brigade at Metro Jaya, on 30 December 2010 Murad became an Intermediate Policy Analyst for the Mobile Brigade of the Police. On March 25, 2013, Murad became regional police chief of Maluku and continued as regional police chief of Maluku until 14 December 2013 with the rank of Brigadier General. Successfully becoming the Police Chief of Maluku, Murad was inaugurated as the Head of Police Mobile Brigade headquarters on December 31, 2015.

== Governor of Maluku ==
=== Election ===
After retiring from the police in 2018, Murad ran for governor of Maluku in the 2018 governor election. Murad was supported by his own Indonesian Democratic Party of Struggle in the election, as well as a number of other parties. Including the Great Indonesia Movement Party, United Development Party, People's Conscience Party, and a number of other smaller parties.

Murad was paired with Barnabas Orno as his running mate, and faced incumbent governor Said Assagaff, who had the support of Golkar, the Prosperous Justice Party, the Democratic Party, and the Crescent Star party. Independent candidate Herman Koedoeboen, also ran in the election.

The Murad-Orno ticket won the election with 40,83%, defeating Said, who received 31,16%, and Herman, who received 28,01%.

=== Tenure ===
==== Swearing in ====
Murad was sworn in as governor on 24 April 2019, by president Joko Widodo, at the Merdeka Palace, Jakarta. Together with his deputy governor, Barnabas.

==== Kempupera project controversy ====
On 18 December 2019, Deputy Governor Barnabas Orno was summoned by the Corruption Eradication Commission as a witness related to the alleged bribery of a road project at the Ministry of Public Works and Public Housing in 2016, when Orno was still the Regent of Southwest Maluku. Reportedly, Murad was only notified the day before, and was not consulted by Orno beforehand.

==== Covid-19 ====
When the COVID-19 pandemic spread to Maluku, governor Murad established a series of "large-scale social restrictions," instead of lockdowns to prevent the spread of the virus. Recently, governor Murad supported limited face-to-face learning in Ambon City to be implemented immediately. Stating "Now that Ambon is level 3, face-to-face learning must be carried out."

==== Dismissed as a party cadre by PDIP ====
Murad was officially dismissed as an Indonesia Democratic Party of Struggle (PDI-P) cadre after Murad's wife, Widya Pratiwi joined the National Mandate Party (PAN) and also showed an emotional attitude to the Chairperson of the PDIP Central Leadership Council Djarot Saiful Hidayat when Djarot asked Murad for clarification regarding his wife, Widya Pratiwi joining a party other than PDI-P.

His term as governor ended on 24 April 2024, and provincial secretary Sadali Ie replaced him in an acting capacity.

== Personal life ==
Murad has a wife named Widya Pratiwi, and together they have for children. Including Mega Natasya, Reza Ananta P, Nabila Athaya Ismail, and Murad JR Ismail.
