= County of Way =

Way
- Cadastral division
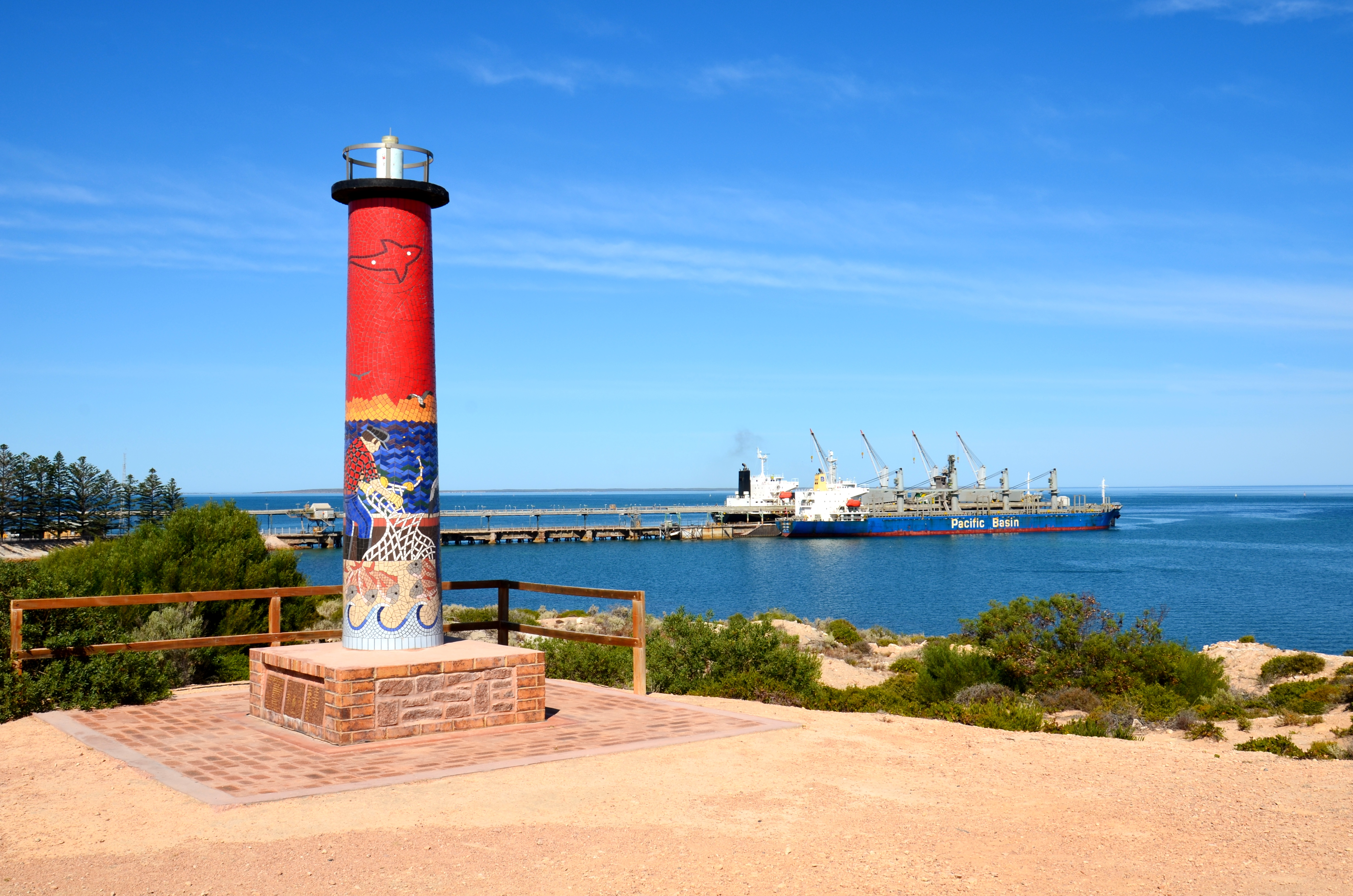
- Jetty and port at Cape Thevenard near Ceduna in the Hundred of Bonython

- Coordinates: 31°53′05″S 133°40′07″E
- Country: Australia
- State: South Australia
- LGA(s): District Council of Ceduna; Pastoral Unincorporated Area
- Established: 16 January 1889

Area
  - Total: 6,800 km^{2} (2,610 sq mi)
Lands administrative divisions around Way
-	-	-
Kintore	Way	Dufferin
Great Australian Bight	Great Australian Bight	Dufferin

The County of Way is one of the 49 counties of South Australia on the state's west coast. It was proclaimed circa 1889 by Governor William Robinson and named for Samuel Way, the Chief Justice of the state's Supreme Court at the time.

It covers a portion of the state's west coast from Acraman Creek Conservation Park, just west of Streaky Bay, to Watraba, about 53 kilometres (33 mi) west of Ceduna The northern half of the county spans most of the Yumbarra Conservation Park.

== Hundreds ==
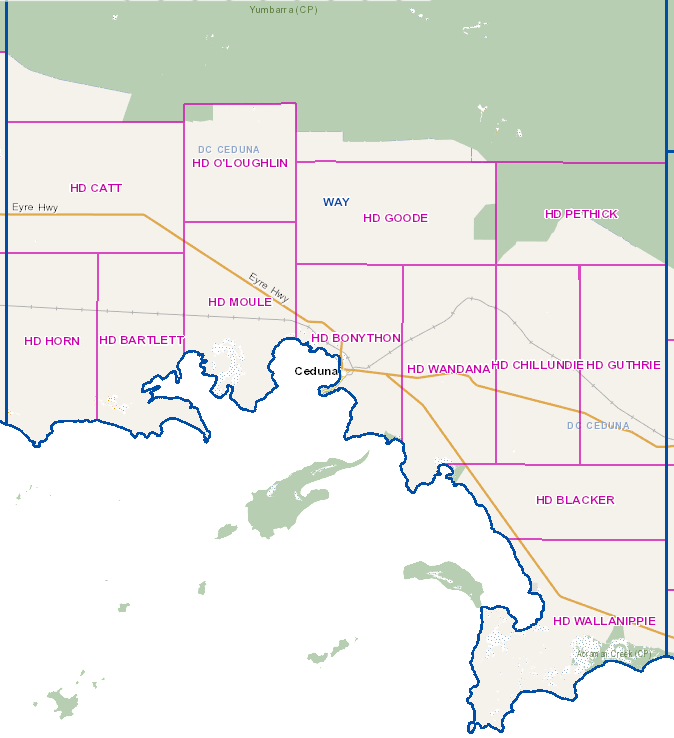
Map of the southern part of the County of Way showing hundred divisions

The County of Way contains the following 13 hundreds, covering approximately the southern half of its total area:

- Hundred of Horn, established 1889 (Charra)
- Hundred of Catt, established 1889 (Watraba, White Well Corner, Koonibba, Uworra)
- Hundred of Bartlett (Charra)
- Hundred of Moule, established 1889 (Nadia, Denial Bay)
- Hundred of O'Loughlin, established 1896 (Koonibba, Kalanbi)
- Hundred of Bonython, established 1893 (Ceduna)
- Hundred of Goode, established 1893 (Kalanbi, Wandana)
- Hundred of Wandana, established 1893 (Wandana, Merghiny, Laura Bay)
- Hundred of Blacker, established 1893 (Laura Bay, Mudamuckla, Puntabie)
- Hundred of Chillundie, established 1893 (Maltee, Merghiny, Mudamuckla)
- Hundred of Guthrie, established 1893 (Mudamuckla, Puntabie)
- Hundred of Pethick, established 1929 (Pureba
- Hundred of Wallanippie, established 1893 (Smoky Bay)
