= Hundred of Catt =

Catt
- Cadastral division
- Coordinates: 31.906°S 133.322°E
- Country: Australia
- State: South Australia
- Established: 17 January 1889

Area
  - Total: 388.7 km^{2} (150.1 sq mi)
- County: Way
Lands administrative divisions around Catt
pastoral unincorporated	pastoral unincorporated	pastoral unincorporated
Bagster	Catt	O'Loughlin
Keith	Horn; Bartlett	Moule

The Hundred of Catt is a cadastral hundred in the County of Way, South Australia established in 1889. It was named for Alfred Catt, member of the state parliament from 1881 to 1902.

The Hundred of Catt (together with the Hundreds of Bartlett, Horn and Moule) were surveyed for closer settlement by William Richard Murray, E B Jones and H J Cant between Nov. 1888 and June 1889.

The centre of the hundred is 10 kilometres (6.2 mi) due west of Koonibba Mission and about 44 kilometres (27 mi) west north west of Ceduna by road, on the far west coast of South Australia. Part of the northern boundary of the hundred shared with Yumbarra Conservation Park.

Localities within the hundred are Watraba (most part), White Well Corner, Koonibba (part), and Uworra.

The traditional owners of the land within the hundred are the Wirangu people.
