= Hundred of Moule =

Moule
- Cadastral division
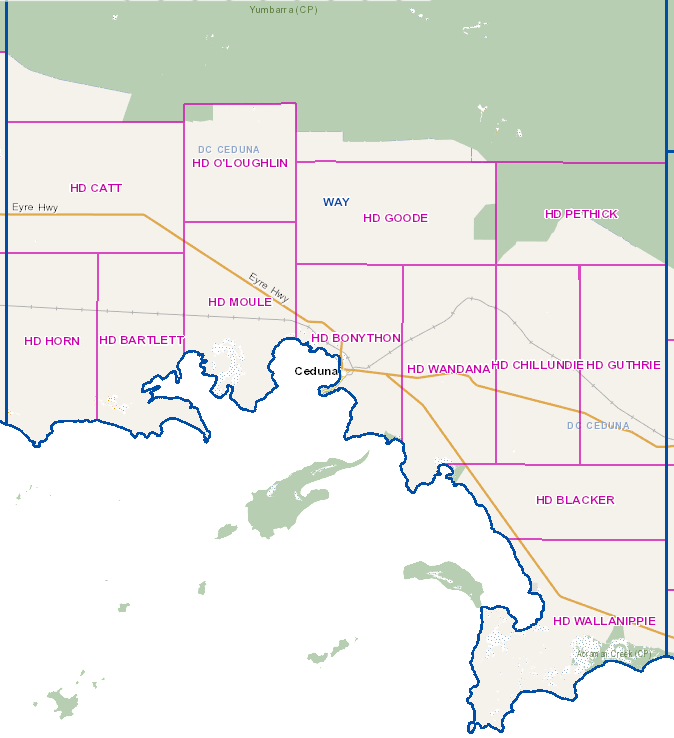
- The Hundred of Moule is located on the southern coast of the County of Way, South Australia

- Coordinates: 32°01′58″S 133°32′03″E
- Country: Australia
- State: South Australia
- Region: Eyre and Western
- LGA(s): Ceduna
- Established: 17 January 1889

Area
  - Total: 300 km^{2} (117 sq mi)
- County: Way
Lands administrative divisions around Moule
Catt	O’Loughlin	Goode
Bartlett; Catt	Moule	Goode; Bonython; Ocean
Ocean	Ocean	Ocean

The Hundred of Moule is a cadastral hundred of South Australia established in 1889 in the remote County of Way. Now bisected by the Eyre Highway, the traditional owners of the area are the Waringu people.
