= Ceduna =

Ceduna may refer to:

- Ceduna, South Australia, a town and locality
- Ceduna Airport
- District Council of Ceduna, a local government area

== See also ==
- Ceduna Waters, South Australia
