= Murat Pasha Mosque =

Murat Pasha Mosque or Murad Pasha Mosque may refer to:

- Murat Pasha Mosque, Aksaray, Istanbul, Turkey
- Murat Pasha Mosque, Antalya, Antalya, Turkey
- Murad Pasha Mosque, Damascus, Syria
- Murat Pasha Mosque, Skopje, North Macedonia
