= Charra, South Australia =

Charra
- Suburb
- Coordinates: 32°04′30″S 133°19′26″E
- Country: Australia
- State: South Australia
- LGA: District Council of Ceduna
- Location: 584 km (363 mi) NW of Adelaide; 33 km (21 mi) SE of Ceduna
- Established: 19 September 1889 (town): 1999 (locality)
- Abolished: 16 May 1929 (town)

Government
  - State electorate: Flinders
  - Federal division: Grey

Population
  - Total: 26 (SAL 2021)
- Time zone: UTC+9:30 (ACST)
  - Summer (DST): UTC+10:30 (ACST)
- Postcode: 5690
- Mean max temp: 23.5 °C (74.3 °F)
- Mean min temp: 10.4 °C (50.7 °F)
- Annual rainfall: 294.6 mm (11.60 in)
- Suburbs around Charra
Watraba	Watraba; Uworra	Ceduna
Penong	Charra	Ceduna; Nadia
Great Australian Bight	Great Australian Bight	Tourville Bay

Charra is a locality in the Australian state of South Australia located on the state's west coast overlooking the Great Australian Bight about 584 kilometres (363 miles) north-west of the state capital of Adelaide and about 33 kilometres (21 miles) west of the municipal seat of Ceduna.

Charra consists of land in the cadastral units of the hundreds of Horn in the west and Bartlett in the east.

The name Charra was first used in 1864 in the name of a pastoral lease known as the "Charra Run" which was held by Messrs. R.B. Smith and W.R. Swan. A government town of the same name was proclaimed on 19 September 1889 and on 16 May 1929 was proclaimed as "ceased to exist". The name was later given to a railway station on the Penong branch of the Eyre Peninsula Railway which is located within the present locality. The name was given to the locality were created in January 1999 and whose boundaries include the ceased government town. Three schools are connected historically to the name with the first operating from 1897 to 1902, the second, the Charra Plains School, operating from 1933 to 1940 and the third, the Charra Woolshed School, which operated from 1904 to 1931 when it was renamed as "Uworra" until its closure in 1944.

As of 2012, the majority land use within the locality was agriculture while the land adjoining the coastline in the south being zoned for conservation.

Charra is located within the federal division of Grey, the state electoral district of Flinders and the local government area of the District Council of Ceduna.

== People ==
- Kade Chandler (born 2000) – Australian rules footballer for Melbourne
- Jay Polkinghorne (born 2006) – Australian rules footballer for Geelong
