= Denial Bay =

- Town
- Coordinates: 32°06′06″S 133°34′32″E
- Country: Australia
- State: South Australia
- Region: Eyre and Western
- LGA: District Council of Ceduna
- Location: 562 km (349 mi) NW of Adelaide; 10 km (6.2 mi) W of Ceduna
- Established: 1889 (settlement); 1910 (town); 1999 (locality)

Government
  - State electorate: Flinders
  - Federal division: Grey
- Elevation: 1 m (3.3 ft)

Population
  - Total: 153 (SAL 2021)
- Time zone: UTC+9:30 (ACST)
  - Summer (DST): UTC+10:30 (ACST)
- Postcode: 5690
- County: Way
- Mean max temp: 23.5 °C (74.3 °F)
- Mean min temp: 10.4 °C (50.7 °F)
- Annual rainfall: 294.8 mm (11.61 in)
Localities around Denial Bay
Ceduna	Ceduna	Ceduna
Nadia	Denial Bay	Murat Bay (water body)
Tourville Bay (water body)	Denial Bay (water body)	Denial Bay (water body)

Denial Bay (formerly McKenzie) is a town and an associated locality in the Australian state of South Australia located on the state's west coast about 562 kilometres (349 mi) north-west of the state capital of Adelaide and about 10 kilometres (6.2 mi) west of the municipal seat of Ceduna. The town which is located on the western side of Murat Bay has extensive European history, first built on in 1889, and now hosts a large expanse of oyster farms, one of the largest on the Eyre Peninsula.

== History ==
The bay which the town is named after initially mapped by Matthew Flinders in 1802, as part of a wider attempt to map South Australia's coastline. Flinders named the inlet "Denial Bay" because of "the deceptive hope we had formed of penetrating by it some distance into the interior of the country".

The first European exploration of the hinterland was in August 1839 by John Hill and Samuel Stephens, using the chartered brig Rapid as a base.

The town was established by William McKenzie in 1889 as the first settlement in what was to become the Ceduna area. McKenzie nearly single-handedly set up the town, clearing mallee scrub by axe, building a general store and becoming the local harbour master, postman, blacksmith, butcher, saddler and Justice of the Peace, employing up to 30 people at any one time.

The town established primarily as a loading and offloading point for the various inland farming activities, and this was done using a unique system based on the rocky floor of the bay's seabed.

A large wooden platform known as 'McKenzie's Landing' was constructed and at high tide, boats would unload goods onto the platform and at low tides horse and cart would be used to collect the items. The same would be done to load boats.

The town was surveyed during December 1909 and proclaimed under the name McKenzie on 16 June 1910 presumably after William McKenzie. The town was officially renamed as Denial Bay on 19 September 1940.

During this peak of activity, a school opened in 1897 and continued operation until 1945. In 1909, a jetty was constructed south of McKenzie's Landing after a 1905 proposal, and still stands today.

The boundaries of the locality were proclaimed in January 1999.

Another piece of history at Denial Bay is the famous dog fence which runs down to the water near McKenzie's Landing.

The town has long since ceased functioning as a port, and today relies on the aquaculture industry, as well as tourism.

== Economy ==
The economy of Denial Bay now depends heavily on the production of Oysters by aquaculture, as well as minor inputs from tourism.

Oyster farming was established in the area in 1985, with 105 hectares (260 acres) of intertidal farms allocated to farmers within the bay. The maximum size per individual farm was 10 hectares (25 acres). This has since increased to over 200 hectares (490 acres) in Denial and Murat Bays.

The oysters grown in both the Denial Bay and Smoky Bay regions account for approximately 20% of all oysters grown in the state. The oyster growing industry is celebrated each year during 'Oysterfest' in Ceduna.

Tourism in the town is centred around recreational fishing and other marine based activities such as snorkelling, scuba diving, swimming and even surfing along some parts of the coast.

The bay has an unusually high density of the Blue Swimmer Crab, making it a popular destination for crabbers, with crabs caught off the jetty or by boat. Other notable species caught in the bay include Snapper, King George and Yellowfin Whiting, Salmon, Mulloway, Shark and Squid, as well as a host of other species.

== Media ==
A newspaper, the Denial Bay Starter, a weekly paper issued every Saturday, was printed in Denial Bay from 14 November 1908 to 29 January 1910.

== Facilities ==
Denial Bay is a very small town, and as such has very limited facilities. The town does have a small general store that sells petrol and groceries, with a public payphone located nearby. A full range of shopping and business services is located in Ceduna only 12 kilometres away by sealed road.

The town has very little in the way of accommodation, sporting grounds, eateries or other services.

== Governance ==
Denial Bay is located within the federal Division of Grey, the state electoral district of Flinders and the local government area of the District Council of Ceduna.
