= Murat (name) =

Murat is a French surname and Turkish male given name, derived from the Arabic Murad. Its Arabic meaning can be translated roughly into "wanted", "desired", "wished for", "yearned", or "goal".

It may refer to:

== Given name ==
- Murat Aitkhozhin (1939–1987), Kazakh-Soviet biologist, Deputy of the Supreme Soviet of the USSR
- Murat Akça (born 1990), Turkish footballer
- Murat Akhedzhak (1962–2010), Russian politician
- Murat Akyüz (born 1981), Turkish footballer
- Murat Auezov (born 1943), Kazakh writer
- Murat Bardakçı (born 1955), Turkish journalist
- Murat Başesgioğlu (born 1955), Turkish politician and MP for Kastamonu
- Murat Belge (born 1943), Turkish liberal intellectual, academic, literary critic, columnist, and civil rights activist
- Murat Bisembin (1972–2026), Kazakh actor
- Murat Boz (born 1980), Turkish pop singer
- Murat Çetinkaya (born 1976), Governor of the Central Bank of Turkey
- Murat Ceylan (born 1988), Turkish footballer
- Murat Didin (born 1955), Turkish basketball coach
- Murat Direkçi (born 1979), Turkish kickboxer
- Murat Duruer (born 1988), Turkish footballer
- Murat Evliyaoğlu (born 1969), Turkish basketball player
- Murat Gassiev (born 1993), Ossetian boxer
- Murat Gülsoy (born 1967), Turkish writer
- Murat Günak (born 1957), Turkish automobile designer
- Murat Karayalçın (born 1943), Turkish politician
- Murat Karayılan (born 1954), Acting leader of the Kurdistan Workers Party
- Murat Kaya (born 1984), Turkish basketball player
- Murat Kurnaz (born 1982), Turkish former prisoner at Guantanamo Bay
- Murat Nasyrov (1969-2007), Uyghur pop singer
- Murat Nurtileu (born 1976), Kazakh politician and diplomat
- Murat Önal (born 1987), Turkish-Dutch footballer
- Murat Ongun (born 1975), Turkish journalist
- Murat Önür (born 1981), Turkish footballer
- Murat Öztürk (aviator) (1953–2013), Turkish aerobatic pilot
- Murat Öztürk (footballer) (born 1969), Turkish football coach
- Murat Sözgelmez (born 1985), Turkish footballer
- Murat Telibekov (born 1958), Kazakh religious leader
- Murat Torun (born 1994), Turkish footballer
- Murat Turan (born 1975), Turkish para archer
- Murat Ülker (born 1959), Turkish billionaire businessman
- Murat Yenipazar (born 1993), Turkish volleyball player
- Murat Yıldırım (disambiguation)
- Murat Zyazikov (born 1957), 2nd President of the Russian republic of Ingushetia
- Murat Pasha (disambiguation)
- Murat Reis (disambiguation)

=== Ottoman nobility ===
- Murad I (1326–1389), Sultan of the Ottoman Empire from 1359 to 1389
- Murad II (1404–1451), Sultan of the Ottoman Empire from 1421 to 1451
- Murad III (1546–1595), Sultan of the Ottoman Empire from 1574 to 1595
- Murad IV (1612–1640), Sultan of the Ottoman Empire from 1623 to 1640
- Murad V (1840–1904), Sultan of the Ottoman Empire from 30 May to 31 August 1876

== Surname ==
- Prince Achille Murat (1801–1847), son of Joachim Murat, planter in Florida
- Alejandro Murat Hinojosa (born 1975), Mexican politician
- Henriette-Julie de Murat (1670–1716), French writer
- Jean-Louis Murat (1952–2023), pseudonym of French singer Jean-Louis Bergheaud
- Joachim Murat (1767–1815), King of Naples, Marshal of France and Admiral of France under the reign of Napoleon
- Joachim Joseph André Murat (1828–1904), French politician
- José Murat Casab (born 1947), Mexican politician
- Júlia Murat (born 1979), Brazilian film director, writer and producer
- Kapllan Murat (born 1962), Albania-born Belgian criminal
- Karo Murat (born 1983), German boxer of Armenian descent
- Marko Murat (1864–1944), Croatian painter
- Özkan Murat (born 1957), Turkish politician
- Tuğçe Murat (born 1991), Turkish basketball player
- Zeynep Murat (born 1983), Turkish female taekwondo practitioner

== See also ==
- Murat (disambiguation)
- Marat (disambiguation)
