= Murat Bay =

- Location within South Australia Location within Australia
- Location: Ceduna, South Australia
- Coordinates: 32.12°S 133.62°E
- Type: Bay
- Etymology: Joachim Murat
- Part of: Denial Bay, Great Australian Bight
- Basin countries: Australia
- Settlements: Ceduna, Denial Bay

Murat Bay is a bay at the western end of the Eyre Peninsula in South Australia. It is an inlet of the Great Australian Bight. The main town on the bay is Ceduna.

The Tourville and Murat Bays Important Bird Area includes Murat Bay.

Murat Bay was initially named Baie des Saints by Nicolas Baudin, and renamed to Baie Murat by François Péron and Louis de Freycinet on the same expedition, named after Joachim Murat, a Marshal of France. As that name was in French, the current name is the English translation.

Matthew Flinders named the bay Denial Bay, which is now the name of a small community on the western side of the bay. Murat Bay is the enclosed bay bounded by Cape Thevenard and Matts Point. Denial Bay is the larger body of water bounded by Nuyts Archipelago on the seaward side.
