= Sean Campbell =

Sean Campbell may refer to:

- Seán Campbell (trade unionist) (1889–1950), Irish trade unionist and politician
- Sean Campbell (actor) in Quest for Zhu
- Sean Campbell, drummer in The Ocean Fracture
- Sean Campbell (field hockey) (born 1973), Canadian field hockey player
- Sean Campbell (footballer) (born 1974), English former footballer

== See also ==
- Shaun Campbell (disambiguation)
- Shawn Campbell (disambiguation)
