= Murat =

Murat may refer to:

== Places ==
=== Australia ===
- Murat Bay, a bay in South Australia
- Murat Marine Park, a marine protected area

=== France ===
- Murat, Allier, a commune in the department of Allier
- Murat, Cantal, a commune in the department of Cantal

=== Elsewhere ===
- Murat, Bari, a once independent village, now a historic neighbourhood in Bari, Apulia.
- Murat, Iran, a village in Lorestan Province
- Murat Rural LLG, a local government area in New Ireland Province, Papua New Guinea
- Murat River, Turkey
- Murat, Wisconsin, United States, an unincorporated community

== Other uses ==
- Murat (name), people with the given name or surname
- Murat Centre, an entertainment venue in Indianapolis, Indiana currently known as the Old National Centre
- Murat Shrine, a masonic building in Indianapolis, Indiana

== See also ==
- Murat-le-Quaire, a commune in the department of Puy-de-Dôme, France
- Murat-sur-Vèbre, a commune in the department of Tarn, France
- Gourdon-Murat, a commune in the Corrèze department in central France
- Marat (disambiguation)
- Murad (disambiguation)
