= Shaun Campbell =

Shaun Campbell may refer to:

- Shaun Campbell (James Bond), a character from On Her Majesty's Secret Service
- Shaun Campbell (editor) of FlightPathTV

== See also ==
- Shawn Campbell (disambiguation)
- Sean Campbell (disambiguation)
