= Gülsoy =

Gülsoy is a surname, likely of Turkish origin. Notable people with the surname include:

- Buğra Gülsoy (born 1982), Turkish actor, author, screenwriter, director, producer, architect, graphic designer, and photographer
- Murat Gülsoy (born 1967), Turkish writer
