= Murat Pasha =

Murat Pasha may refer to the following Ottoman statesmen:

- Seytan Murat Pasha (d. 1570), variously governor of Damascus, Shahrazor, Basra and Lahsa, also known as Kara Murat Pasha
- Kuyucu Murat Pasha, grand vizier in 1605–1611
- Kara Murat Pasha, grand vizier in 1649–1650, and shortly in 1655
- Józef Bem, Polish revolutionary general and national hero of Poland, converted to Islam during his career in the Ottoman Empire and changed his name to Murat Pasha.

== See also ==
- Muratpaşa, a district of Antalya Province, Turkey
  - Muratpaşa Belediyesi Spor Kulübü, a sports club based there
- Murat Paşa Mosque, a mosque in Antalya
- Murat (name)
