= Marat =

Marat may refer to:

== People ==
- Marat (given name)
- Marat (surname)
  - Jean-Paul Marat (1743–1793), French political theorist, physician, and scientist

== Arts, entertainment, and media ==
- Marat/Sade, a 1963 play by Peter Weiss
- Marat/Sade (film), a 1967 adaptation by Adrian Mitchell
- The Death of Marat, a 1793 painting
- Il piccolo Marat, an opera

== Places ==
- Marat (Phoenicia), a former Phoenician town now known as Amrit, Syria
- Marat, Puy-de-Dôme, a commune in France
- Marat Fjord, Severnaya Zemlya
- Marat Shahr, a village in Mazandaran Province, Iran

== Ships ==
- Marat (ex-Petropavlovsk), a Soviet battleship
- Marat, the French name of HMS Belleisle

== See also ==
- Murat (disambiguation)
