= The Sunmachine and the Ocean =

Studio album by The Ocean Fracture
- Released: 2006
- Recorded: 2006
- Genres: Post-hardcore, experimental rock
- Length: 47 Mins
- Label: EyesOfSound
- Producer: Ben Phillips

The Ocean Fracture chronology
In Azure Silence, In Azure Decay (2005)	The Sunmachine and the Ocean (2006)	Cesarium/Black Lung Optimism (2008)

"The Sunmachine and the Ocean" is the first official release from Scottish post-hardcore band The Ocean Fracture, and was produced by Ben Phillips at City Of Dis studios in Gillingham, Kent. It was released in September 2006 by Eyesofsound records, which has also released records by Devil Sold His Soul And Bossk.

The second song on the album, "Polaroid Intimacy" was featured in covermount CDs free with the corresponding issues of Rock Sound and Big Cheese magazines in which the album was reviewed.

== Track listing ==
1 - Thalassa (5.25)
2 - Polaroid Intimacy (5.05)
3 - Shallows (7.09)
4 - Kaladitas (7.26)
5 - Kai Ilios Machina (22.15)

== Press Reception ==
"Not too many bands have the balls to write music with the kind of jaw dropping ambition and eye on progression that The Ocean Fracture manage on this exceptional debut mini-album... as much as we all need the quick melodic fix of an over-produced rock band, it is equally important that we challenge our minds and, quite frankly, it doesn't get more worthy than this."

- Rock Sound Magazine, Issue 87 - August 2006

"Strange time changes and tunings are prominent throughout and the mix of Thursday-esque singing and insane screeches, roars and screams are something special. Rarely is such emotion and passion heard in today's rock music as on the brave and experimental epics of 'Polaroid Intimacy' and 'Thalassa'."

- Big Cheese Magazine, October 2006

"Though there's been no shortage of bands from the US taking their cues from the designs of Boston post-hardcore pioneers Isis, a small stronghold of guitar experimentation is developing this side of the pond, thanks to the efforts of this glaswegian collective. Full of spiralling guitars, sprawling expanses, melodic highs and gutural lows, 'Sunmachine...' makes for a complex and ambitious statement."

- Kerrang! Magazine, Issue 1124, September 2006

== Lineup ==
Lineup on this release:

Steven Gillies (vocals, guitar)
Paul McArthur (guitar, vocals)
Sean Campbell (drums)
Martin Ritchie (bass, 2005-2008)
