= Shawn Campbell =

Shawn Campbell may refer to:

- Shawn William Campbell, basketball player
- Shawn W. Campbell, general
- Shawn Campbell, character in Christmas with the Campbells

== See also ==
- Shaun Campbell (disambiguation)
- Sean Campbell (disambiguation)
