= FlightPathTV =

New Zealand documentary television show

- Genre: Aviation
- Created by: Malcolm Clement and Fletcher McKenzie
- Written by: Trevor Conn
- Directed by: Malcolm Clement and Andy McGrath
- Narrated by: Mike Binis and Ritchie McCaw (NZ edition)
- Theme music composer: Bruce Lynch
- Country of origin: New Zealand
- Original language: English
- No. of seasons: 1

Production
- Editors: David Arshadi, Rajneel Singh, Shaun Campbell, Annastassia Smirnova, Chris Anderton
- Camera setup: Malcolm Clement, Matthew Perry, Raymond Hawes, Marty Dean, Fletcher McKenzie
- Production company: Leading Edge Media

Original release
- Network: Discovery Turbo (Asia); Discovery Turbo MAX

FlightPathTV is a New Zealand documentary television show about aviation. It was created by Malcolm Clement and Fletcher McKenzie and produced by Leading Edge Media. Filmed at locations around the world, FlightPathTV was produced in New Zealand.

Each episode of the thirteen-week series was filmed at air shows and other aviation events, and profiled pilots, aviation destinations and the histories of famous aircraft.

== History ==
Production of FlightPathTV commenced in March 2007 at the Australian International Airshow in Geelong, Australia. The film crew then traveled to the Wide Bay International Airshow in Queensland, Australia, the Classic Fighters show in Blenheim, New Zealand, the Warbirds Over Wanaka in Wanaka, New Zealand, the Reno Air Races in Reno, Nevada, Pearl Harbor, the Imperial War Museum Duxford in Duxford, England, and the Shuttleworth Collection in Bedfordshire, England.

New Zealand's state broadcaster, Television New Zealand (TVNZ), declined to purchase FlightPathTV. The show was later purchased by Discovery UK, Finland's MTV3 Channel, Denmark's DR HD Channel, Discovery Turbo Asia, Malaysia's Astro Channel and Discovery Turbo (Australia).

The pilot episode of FlightPathTVscreened on Sky TV's Documentary Channel in New Zealand on 2 July 2009, and in Australia. After the screening of the pilot episode, work commenced on the post production of all thirteen episodes.

Ex All Black captain Ritchie McCaw narrated New Zealand edition of FlightPathTV

FlightPathTV first aired in Australia on 1 January 2011, and also aired in Denmark, Finland, Malaysia and throughout Asia and the UK.

In December 2009 FlightPathTV assisted WWII veteran Ray Richards to reunite with the World War II Corsair FG-D1 he flew in the British Fleet Air Arm.

== Aircraft filmed for FlightPathTV ==
- A-10 Thunderbolt II
- AD-4 Skyraider
- ATG - Javelin
- Auster
- Avenger
- B-17 Bomber
- B-25 Bomber
- B-52 Bomber
- Boeing 747-400
- Boeing Stearman
- Bombardier Global 5000
- C-130H Hercules
- C-17 Globemaster
- C-27J Spartan
- Cessna Bird Dog
- Cessna Dragonfly
- Cessna Mustang
- CT-4 Airtrainer
- DC-3
- DHC-4 Caribou
- Dragon (Flying Doctor)
- E-3 Sentry (AWACs)
- Edge 540
- EXTRA 300 S (Vero)
- EXTRA 300 SHP (Castrol Aviator)
- F/A-18 Hornet
- F/A-18F Super Hornet
- F-111 Aardvark
- F-14 Tomcat
- F-15C Eagle
- F-16 Fighting Falcon
- F-35 Joint Force Fighter
- Giles 202
- Gulfstream G550
- Hang Glider (Dan Buchanan)
- Harvard
- Hawk Jet
- Interstate Cadet
- Jet Glider
- Kiowa Helicopter
- Kittyhawk
- MIG-15
- Nanchang
- P-3 Orion
- P-51 Mustang
- PB-Y Catalina
- PC-9 (Roulettes)
- Pitts Special (Bulldog)
- Pitts Special (Sperou)
- R44
- Reno Biplane Class
- Reno Formula One Class
- Reno Jet Class
- Reno Sport Class
- Reno Unlimited Class
- Sabre
- Sea Fury
- Sea Hawk S-70B-2
- Sea King
- Seasprite
- Seeker
- Snowbirds Display Team
- Squirrel Helicopter
- Strikemaster
- Super Constellation
- Super Corsair
- T-28 Trojan
- T-33
- T-6 Texan
- Tiger Helicopter
- Tiger Moth
- UH-60 Black Hawk
- Wirraway
- Wright Flyer (replica)
- X-1 (replica)
- Yak 52
- Yuka
- Zero

== Pilots interviewed on FlightPathTV ==
- Al Goss, Reno Air Race Champion
- Chris Sperou, Pitts S-1-11B 'Super Stinker'
- Colonel Charles Cook (Ret), B-17 Flying Fortress
- Colonel Raynor Roberts (Ret), P-38 (and Air Force One Pilot 26000)
- Dan Buchanan, Paraplegic Pilot "Flying Colours" North Wing Hang Glider
- Fleet Air Arm Pilot Ray Richards (Ret), Corsair
- Jurgis Kairys, Yuka, Air Bandits, ex Red Bull Pilot
- Keith Skilling, ex Breitling Fighters
- Kent Pietsch, Jelly Belly Pietsch Air Shows 1942 Interstate Cadet
- Matt Hall, Red Bull Air Race Pilot
- Michael Goulian, Castrol Aviator EXTRA 300SHP, Red Bull Air Race Pilot
- Nigel Lamb, Red Bull Air Race Pilot
- Paul Andronicau, Vero EXTRA 300 S
- Pip Borman, Castrol Aviator Edge 540
- Ricardo Traven, Boeing Test Pilot, F/A-18 Super Hornet
- Squadron Leader Doug Bruno Brown (Ret), Spitfire
- Squadron Leader Les Munro (Ret), Lancaster (and Dambusters Pilot)
- Steve Hinton, Reno Air Race Legend
