= Murad (disambiguation) =

Murad is an Arabic male given name.

Murad may also refer to:

- Murad (cigarette), a brand of Turkish cigarettes
- Murad (actor) (1911–1997), Indian film actor
- Murad (film), a 2003 British film
- Murad, Iran
- Murad, Yemen or Hisn Murad
- Murad (tribe), a Yemeni tribe

== See also ==
- Murat (disambiguation)
