= Allan Suter =

Allan Suter was the mayor of the District Council of Ceduna in South Australia from 2006 to 2018, a commercial shark fisherman and former spokesperson for the West Coast Professional Fishermen's Association. He holds several national and South Australian game fishing records, which he set between 1985 and 1992.

== Politics ==
In 2014, Suter was re-elected to his position as mayor unopposed. Suter has taken strong positions on a number of sensitive political issues for the west coast of South Australia. These include his support for trials of a cashless debit card income management system for welfare recipients and the dispersing of "loitering" groups of aboriginal people from Ceduna's main street. Suter has also challenged what he considers to be misrepresentations of Ceduna's social problems, including drunken disorder, as reported by mainstream journalists and columnists for The Advertiser, including Tory Shepherd. He claims that progress has been made following media reports on the subject in previous years.

Suter has supported the interests of the fishing industry, challenged the merits and planning of South Australian marine parks and criticised South Australian marine scientists and fisheries management authorities. He has stated that he believed that the introduction of state-managed marine parks represented "dangerous harm" for regional South Australian communities, and rejected claims about the projected economic potential for marine park eco-tourism in his region in a study commissioned by the Conservation Council of South Australia. He referred to the process of developing regional impact statements related to marine parks as a "farce" and described the statements as "ludicrous rubbish". He has expressed concern about marine parks reducing areas accessible to commercial fishing, including marine scale fish and southern rock lobster fisheries. Suter has been critical of SARDI's fisheries stock assessment processes, and in 2015 accused SARDI's whale researchers of "chasing whales to exhaustion" when tagging seven animals in the Great Australian Bight.

Suter has filled the role of Chair of the Kimba Consultative Committee for the National Radioactive Waste Management Facility process.

== Personal life ==
Suter is a boat owner and record-holding recreational fisherman. He holds a Game Fishing Association of Australia national record for a 31 kilogram mulloway caught from land on 8 kilogram line near Ceduna in 1992. He also holds a South Australian record for a 31.2 kilogram mulloway caught on 6 kilogram line in 1986. He also holds further state records for catches of a 270 kilogram bronze whaler shark (15 kg line, 1987), a 26.4 kilogram western blue groper (15 kg line, 1987) and a 35 kilogram smooth stingray (6 kg line, 1985). All of Suter's records were set near Ceduna.
