= Hundred of Bonython =

The Hundred of Bonython is a hundred and in the County of Way, South Australia proclaimed in 1893.

The main population centre within the hundred is the town of Ceduna.
