= Murat Yıldırım =

Murat Yıldırım may refer to the following people:

- Murat Yıldırım (actor) (born 1979), Turkish actor
- Murat Yıldırım (footballer) (born 1987), Turkish professional footballer

== See also ==
- Murat (name)
