= Marat (given name) =

Marat is a male and given name. It is a common given name for males from the former Soviet republics (Марат).

In Russia it is a common variant of the Arabic name Morat (Морат), which is derived from the classic Arabic Murad (مراد). Another influence could be the French revolutioner Jean-Paul Marat.

== People named Marat ==
- Marat Akbarov (born 1961), former Soviet pairs figure skater
- Marat Amankulov (1970–2026), Kyrgyz politician
- Marat Balagula (1943–2019), Russian mob boss
- Marat Basharov (born 1974), Soviet and Russian actor
- Marat Bikmoev (born 1986), Uzbek football striker (soccer forward)
- Marat Bisengaliev (born 1962), Kazakh violinist
- Marat Ganeyev (born 1964), Russian track cyclist
- Marat Gelman (born 1960), Russian collector
- Marat Grigorian (born 1991), Armenian professional kickboxer
- Marat Izmailov (born 1982), Russian football player
- Marat Khusnullin (born 1966), Russian Tatar politician
- Marat Khusnutdinov (born 2002), Russian ice hockey player
- Marat Ksanayev (born 1981), Russian footballer
- Marat Magkeyev (born 1983), Russian football (soccer) player
- Marat Safin (born 1980), Russian professional tennis player
- Marat Sharafutdinov, Russian amateur micro stakes poker player the winner of the 2012 WCOOP
- Marat Shogenov (born 1984), Russian footballer
- Marat Tazhin (born 1960), Kazakh politician
- Marat Zakirov (born 1973), Russian water polo player
- Paolo "Marat" Lega (1868–1896), Italian anarchist

== Other forms ==
- Russian: Marat (Марат)
- Ukrainian: Marat (Марат)

== See also ==
- Marat (disambiguation), for people with the surname Marat and other meanings
