= Nadia, South Australia =

Nadia South Australia
- Coordinates: 32.08°S 133.48°E
- Population: 3 (SAL 2016)
- Established: 1999
- Postcode(s): 5690
- Time zone: ACST (UTC+9:30)
  - Summer (DST): ACST (UTC+10:30)
- Location: 567 km (352 mi) NW of Adelaide city centre; 17 km (11 mi) SE of Ceduna
- LGA(s): District Council of Ceduna
- State electorate(s): Flinders
- Federal division(s): Grey
Mean max temp	Mean min temp	Annual rainfall
23.5 °C; 74 °F	10.4 °C; 51 °F	294.6 mm 11.6 in
Suburbs around Nadia:
Charra	Ceduna	Ceduna
Charra	Nadia	Denial Bay
ocean	ocean	Denial Bay
- Footnotes: Adjoining localities

Nadia is a locality in the Australian state of South Australia located on the state's west coast overlooking a bay associated with Great Australian Bight about 567 kilometres (352 miles) north-west of the Adelaide city centre and about 17 kilometres (11 miles) west of the town centre of Ceduna.

The boundaries of the locality were created in January 1999 with the name reported as being derived from the following local features - Nadia Well and Nadia Landing.

Nadia is bounded in the south by the coastline with Tourville Bay and in the north by the Penong branch of the Eyre Peninsula Railway and by the localities of Charra and Denial Bay respectively in the west and the east. As of 2012, the majority land use within the locality was conservation which concerned land at the locality's south including the coastline with land at the northern end of locality being zoned for agricultural purposes.

The 2016 Australian census which was conducted in August 2016 reports that three people were living within Nadia's boundaries.

Nadia is located within the federal Division of Grey, the state electoral district of Flinders and the local government area of the District Council of Ceduna.
