= Kade Chandler =

Australian rules footballer (born 2000)

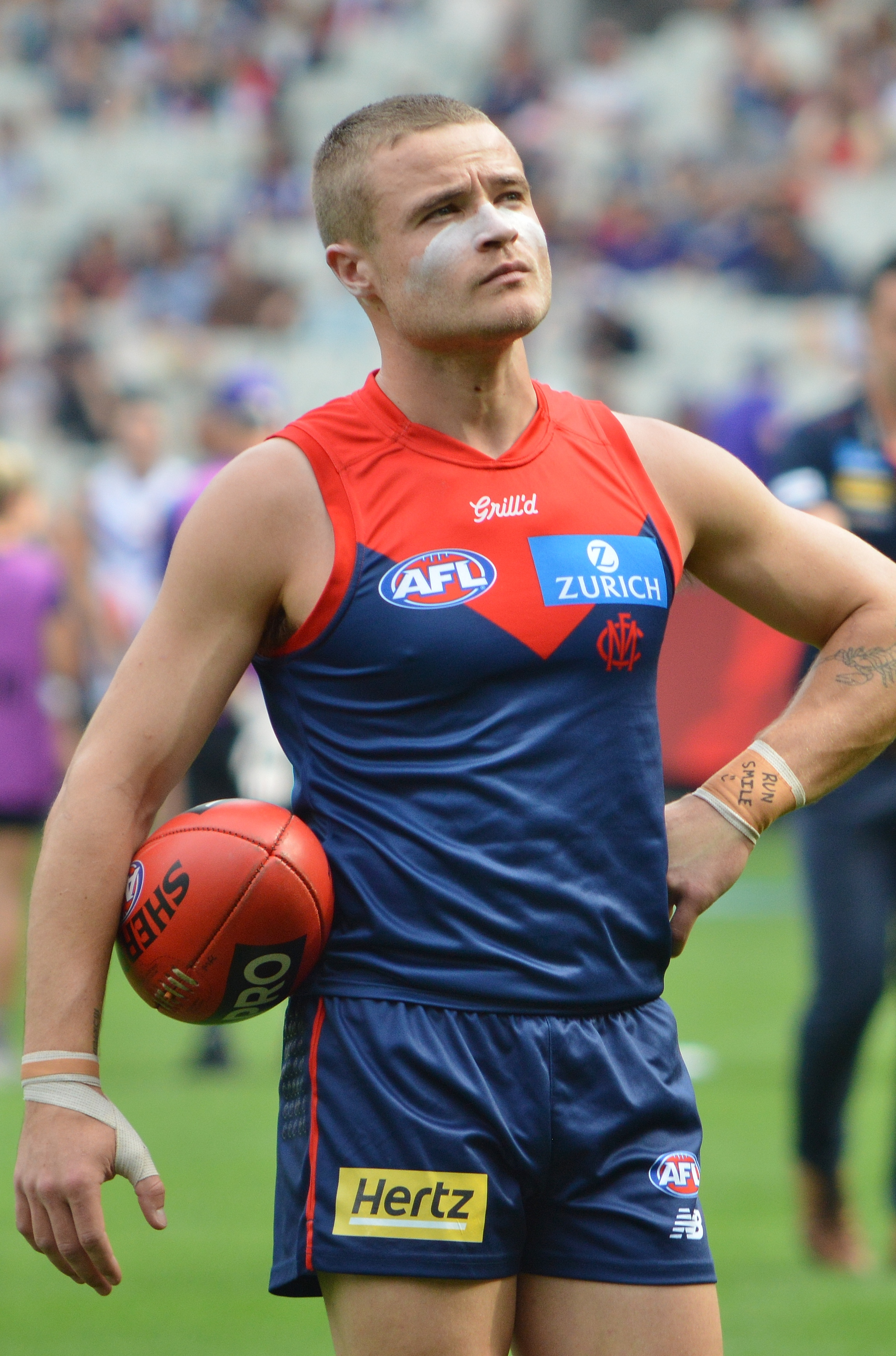
- Chandler in April 2025

Personal information
- Full name: Kade Thomas Chandler
- Nickname: Chin
- Born: 13 January 2000 (age 26); Charra, South Australia
- Original teams: Western United Tigers (Western Eyre Football League); Norwood (South Australian National Football League)
- Draft: No. 15, 2019 rookie draft
- Debut: 16 August 2019, round 22, 2019, Melbourne vs. Sydney, at MCG
- Height: 174 cm (5 ft 9 in)
- Weight: 75 kg (165 lb)
- Position: Small forward / midfielder
- Other occupation: Window cleaner

Club information
- Current club: Melbourne
- Number: 37

Playing career^{1}
Years	Club	Games (Goals)
2019–	Melbourne	100 (81)
- ^{1} Playing statistics correct to the end of round 23, 2026.

Career highlights
- VFL premiership player: 2022

Kade Thomas Chandler (born 13 January 2000) is an Australian rules footballer who plays for the Melbourne Football Club in the Australian Football League (AFL).

Born and raised in Charra, South Australia, Chandler grew up playing for Western United Tigers in the Western Eyre Football League, before later joining Norwood in the SANFL prior to being selected at pick number 15 in the 2019 rookie draft. He made his senior debut against Sydney in the penultimate round of the 2019 season. At the conclusion of the 2022 VFL season, Chandler became a VFL premiership player.

== Early life ==
Kade Thomas Chandler was born on 13 January 2000, as one of four sons to Tracey and Milton Chandler. He grew up in Charra, South Australia, a rural locality within the District Council of Ceduna.

== Career ==
Chandler was selected at pick number 15 in the 2019 rookie draft, held ahead of the 2019 season. Prior to his drafting, he had worked as a window cleaner. In Round 22 of the 2019 season, he was selected to make his debut against the Sydney Swans at the Melbourne Cricket Ground (MCG) on 16 August.

His 2022 season culminated in a premiership at VFL level at the conclusion of the 2022 VFL season. During the 2023 season, McDonald's had a customised TV ad that said "Chandler Bang" when Chandler scored a goal, a play on the Friends character Chandler Bing.

== Personal life ==
Chandler's partner, Amy Steele, gave birth to their first child, Albie, in March 2026.

== Statistics ==
Updated to the end of round 22, 2026.

Legend
G	Goals	K	Kicks	D	Disposals	T	Tackles
B	Behinds	H	Handballs	M	Marks

Season	Team	No.	Games	Totals							Averages (per game)							Votes
Season	Team	No.	Games	G	B	K	H	D	M	T	G	B	K	H	D	M	T	Votes
2019	Melbourne	37	1	0	0	4	3	7	2	9	0.0	0.0	4.0	3.0	7.0	2.0	9.0	0
2020 (Note: The 2020 season was played with 17 home-and-away matches per team (down from 22) and 16-minute quarters with time on (down from 20-minute quarters with time on) due to the impact of the COVID-19 pandemic.)		37	0	—	—	—	—	—	—	—	—	—	—	—	—	—	—	0
2021 (Note: 2021 statistics include three games in which Chandler was an unused medical substitute (rounds round 1, 6, and 8).)	Melbourne	37	5	0	0	1	3	4	0	2	0.0	0.0	0.2	0.6	0.8	0.0	0.4	0
2022 (Note: 2022 statistics include three games in which Chandler was the medical substitute (rounds round 7, 9, and 13) and one game in which he was an unused medical substitute (round 20).)	Melbourne	37	4	0	1	4	3	7	3	0	0.0	0.3	1.0	0.8	1.8	0.8	0.0	0
2023 (Note: 2023 statistics include one game in which Chandler was substituted out of the game (round 11) and was replaced by James Jordon.)	Melbourne	37	23	24	13	152	122	274	83	60	1.0	0.6	6.6	5.3	11.9	3.6	2.6	2
2024	Melbourne	37	23	18	9	166	120	286	72	94	0.8	0.4	7.2	5.2	12.4	3.1	4.1	0
2025	Melbourne	37	23	18	8	187	149	336	87	88	0.8	0.3	8.1	6.5	14.6	3.8	3.8	0
2026	Melbourne	37	20	17	13	158	147	305	52	88	0.9	0.7	7.9	7.4	15.3	2.6	4.4	0
Career			99	77	44	672	547	1219	299	341	0.8	0.4	6.8	5.5	12.3	3.0	3.4	2

== Honours and achievements ==
=== Team ===
- VFL premiership player: 2022
