= Ceduna Waters, South Australia =

Ceduna Waters South Australia
- Coordinates: 32.18°S 133.696°E
- Population: 186 (SAL 2021)
- Established: 8 December 2011
- Postcode(s): 5690
- Time zone: ACST (UTC+9:30)
  - Summer (DST): ACST (UTC+10:30)
- Location: 548 km (341 mi) NW of Adelaide; 6 km (4 mi) SE of Ceduna
- LGA(s): District Council of Ceduna
- State electorate(s): Flinders
- Federal division(s): Grey
Mean max temp	Mean min temp	Annual rainfall
23.5 °C; 74 °F	10.4 °C; 51 °F	294.6 mm 11.6 in
Suburbs around Ceduna Waters:
ocean	Ceduna	Ceduna
ocean	Ceduna Waters	Ceduna
ocean	ocean	Ceduna
- Footnotes: Location; Coordinates; Climate; Adjoining localities

Ceduna Waters is a locality in the Australian state of South Australia located on the west coast of the Eyre Peninsula overlooking two bays associated with Great Australian Bight about 548 kilometres (341 miles) north-west of the state capital of Adelaide and about 6 kilometres (3.7 miles) south-east of the town centre of Ceduna.

The boundaries of the locality were created in 2011 by the exclusion of a portion of land from the locality of Ceduna. The locality’s naming is reported as reflecting “the location and the new subdivision's marine focus.”

Ceduna Waters consists of land associated with a section of coastline that includes, from west to east, part of the east coast of Bosanquet Bay, the promontory known as Cape Vivonne and part of the west coast of Decres Bay. As of 2012, the majority land use within the locality was residential with the coastline being zoned for conservation purposes.

Ceduna Waters is located within the federal Division of Grey, the state electoral district of Flinders and the local government area of the District Council of Ceduna.
