= Murat Pasha Mosque, Skopje =

Mosque in Skopje, North Macedonia

Murat Pasha Mosque
- Мурат-пашина џамија
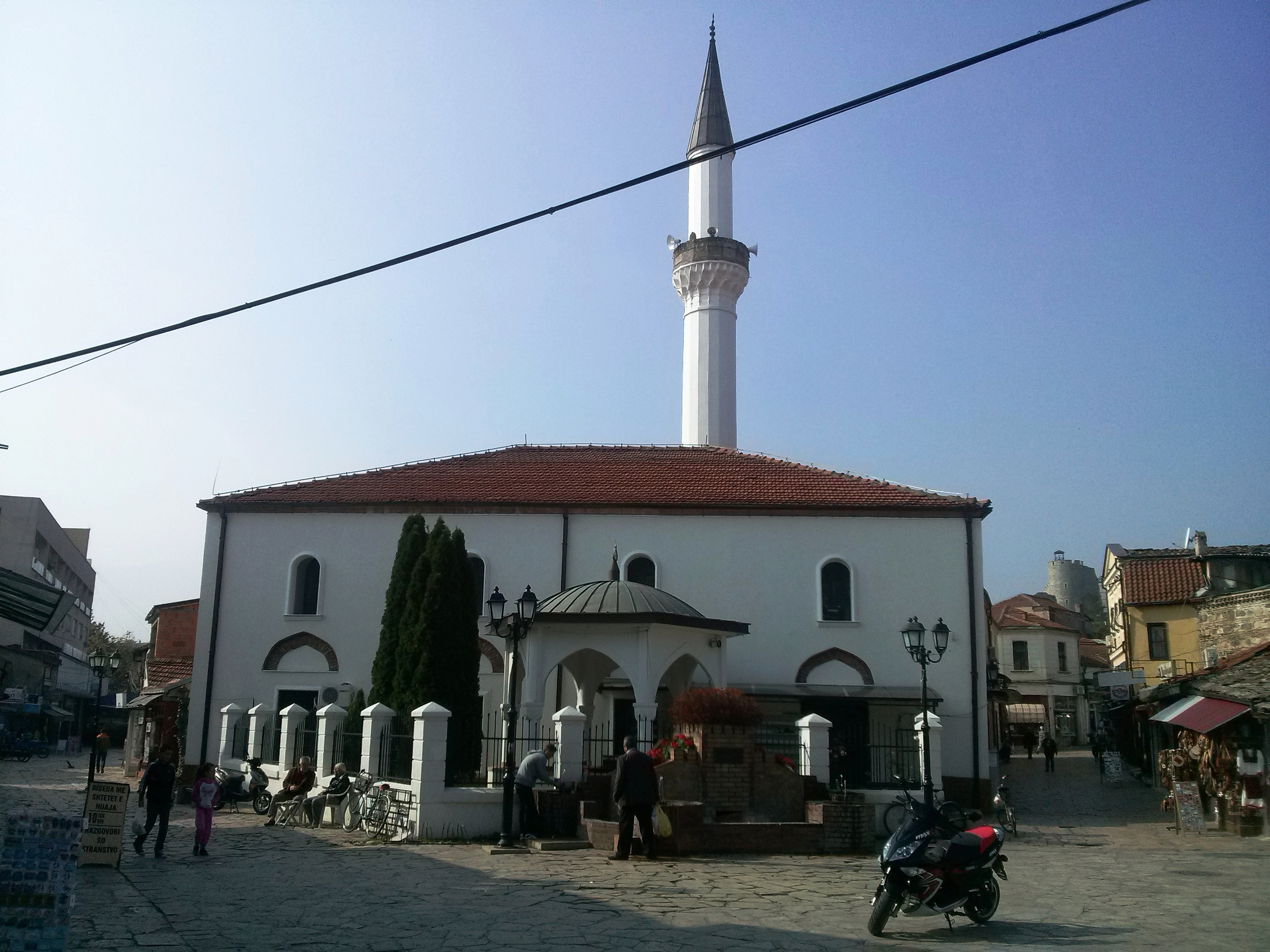

- Location within North Macedonia

Religion
- Affiliation: Islam

Location
- Location: Skopje, North Macedonia
- Interactive map of Murat Pasha Mosque
- Coordinates: 42°00′03″N 21°26′15″E

Architecture
- Type: mosque
- Style: Ottoman Baroque
- Established: 1803

The Murat Pasha Mosque (Macedonian: Мурат-пашина џамија) is a mosque in Skopje, North Macedonia.

== History ==
The mosque was constructed in 1802–1803. In 1937, a fountain was built at the mosque's courtyard. Towards the end of 2000, the mosque underwent renovation under the cooperation with Institute for Protection of Cultural Monuments and National Museum.

== Architecture ==
The mosque was constructed with Ottoman Baroque architecture with elements of neoclassical Islam. The mosque is a quarter-shaped building.

== See also ==
- Islam in North Macedonia
