= Marat (surname) =

Marat is a surname. Notable people with the surname include:

- Jean-Paul Marat (1743–1793), French revolutionary journalist, physician, and scientist
- Allan Marat (born 1954), Papua New Guinean politician
- Luc Marat Abyla, Gabonese politician
