= Chris Sperou =

Australian aerobatic pilot

Chris Sperou (born 25 December 1938, Ceduna, Australia) is an Australian aerobatic pilot. He has won the Australian Aerobatic Championship 13 times and has flown in 5 World Aerobatic Championships.

== Biography ==
Chris Sperou was born on 25 December 1938 at Ceduna, South Australia. He was a professional fisherman for 3 years, then taking up work as a refrigeration mechanic when his family moved to Adelaide in 1956. In 1960, he obtained his pilot's licence before teaching himself aerobatics. Between 1968 and 1987, Sperou won 13 national championships before he retired from competitive flying. In 2002, he was named a "Legend of Outdoor Transport" at the Arkaroola Airshow.
