= Smoky Bay, South Australia =

Smoky Bay South Australia
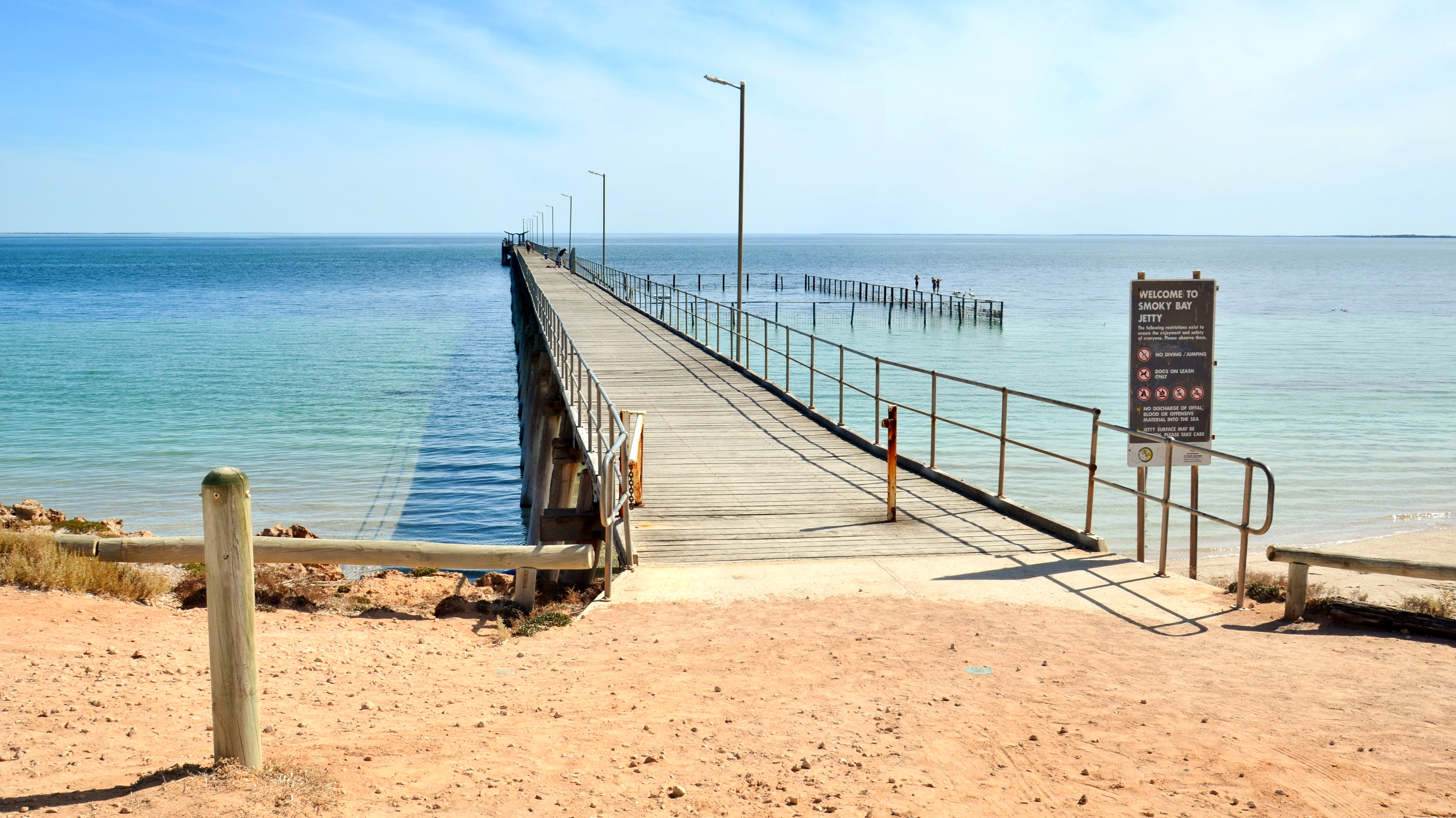
- Smoky Bay Jetty, 2017

- Coordinates: 32°22′36″S 133°56′12″E
- Population: 162 (UCL 2021)
- Established: 13 November 1913 (town); 28 January 1999 (locality)
- Postcode(s): 5680
- Elevation: 1 m (3 ft)
- Time zone: ACST (UTC+9:30)
  - Summer (DST): ACST (UTC+10:30)
- LGA(s): District Council of Ceduna
- Region: Eyre Western
- County: Way
- State electorate(s): Flinders
- Federal division(s): Grey
Localities around Smoky Bay:
Laura Bay	Mudamuckla; Puntabie	Carawa
Smoky Bay (body of water); Great Australian Bight	Smoky Bay	Carawa; Haslam
Great Australian Bight	Great Australian Bight	Streaky Bay (body of water)
- Footnotes: Adjoining localities

Smoky Bay (formerly Wallanippie) is a town and locality located in the Australian state of South Australia on the west coast of the Eyre Peninsula. Previously used as a port, the town is now a residential settlement and popular tourist destination known for its recreational fishing, with a boat ramp and jetty located in the town.

At the 2016 census, the locality of Smoky Bay had a population of 279 of which 217 lived in the town of Smoky Bay.

== History ==
=== European discovery and settlement ===
Smoky Bay's coastline was first sighted and mapped by the British navigator, Matthew Flinders, in 1802, who named it "Smoky Bay" after the amount of smoke from fires lit by the area's Aboriginal people.

Whalers were the first Europeans to inhabit the coastline near the current site of the town, just north of Pt. Collinson. Recently, dune erosion has uncovered parts of the ruins of their camps, with pieces of whale bone and three one-hundred gallon cooking pots discovered. The historic Port Collinson Whaling Station remnants are listed on the South Australian Heritage Register.

In the early 1860s pastoralists arrived in the district. Former Adelaide civil servant Charles Francis Heath (1832–83) established a sheep grazing property which he named Wallanippie Station after the Aboriginal name of a waterhole near his homestead at the back of Point Brown promontory.

A feud took place in 1865 between two Aboriginal men at Wallanippie Station, resulting in one being speared and the other charged with murder. Heath was required to attend the Supreme Court in Adelaide as a witness. The trial was notable in that it was an instance of British law intervening in traditional Aboriginal law.

Following that the government decided that the developing district needed established law and order. On 16 November 1865, Heath was appointed the first justice of the peace and local magistrate for Smoky Bay. After nearly ten years on Eyre Peninsula, Heath returned to Adelaide and rejoined the civil service.

=== Establishment of the government town ===
In the early 1900s the town area was opened up, with the first building a tin hut erected in 1905. Scrubcutters cleared the area by 1906, and by 1911 a post office, repeating station and living quarters had been built. The town continued to grow, with a school and hall opened in 1909. A jetty was proposed for erection in 1908, and finally completed in 1913.

The town of Smoky Bay was surveyed in 1913 under the name of Wallanippie, along with the aforementioned jetty and a Harbour's Board reserve. A large galvanised iron goods shed and a railway line extending to the far end of the jetty were established, allowing the town to operate as a port.

The town's original name of "Wallanippie" was officially changed to "Smoky Bay" in 1940, after continued use of this name by locals since the town's establishment. The town became less important throughout the mid-1900s, and its capacity as a port was diminished, leaving the town as a residential, as well as an agricultural centre for the surrounding community.

The growing of oysters was established in the bay in 1988, providing a new economic facet for the town, and adding to the town's promise as a tourist destination.

During the 2002/2003 summer, a ban on taking all shellfish from the waters of the bay was imposed after a deadly biotoxin was discovered in the shellfish.

== Geography ==
The town of Smoky Bay lies on the bay of the same name, north of Streaky Bay. The bay is shielded from ocean swells by a small promenade of land that leads to Point Brown. Around 10 km offshore lies "Eyre Island", a small, sandy island that also protects the bay.

Offshore lie a number of small, granitic islands which are home to many seabirds and tiger snakes that feed on the birds. The Nuyts Archipelago lies to the west, the islands of which are not easily accessible.

Inside the bay, the calm waters are dominated by shallow stretches of seagrass, sandflats, mudflats, as well as numerous channels or "creeks" that allow boat access, with slightly deeper water.

Surrounding the bay is a mixture of mangroves to the south and coastal sand dune vegetation to the north. The mangroves tend to give the water in some parts of the bay a yellow stain, presumed to be from tannins and decaying leaf matter.

The town itself is situated on a long, sandy beach that ends at the boat ramp. Inland is dominated by agricultural land, used for cropping and grazing of sheep.

The bay is home to a large variety of seabirds, as well as many fish species, including great white sharks, which are frequent visitors from the offshore islands. Seals also enter the bay, providing further incentive for sharks to enter the bay.

== Economy ==
The town has long since ceased function as a port, but since 1988 has experienced a surge in the aquaculture of oysters. The initial area allocation was of 85 ha within Smoky Bay, with individual farms having a maximum size of 10 ha. This has since been increased to 165 ha (including 40 ha of subtidal or deepwater culture). Smoky Bay oysters are well recognized within South Australia, along with other producers such as Coffin Bay.

Tourism has been a rapidly expanding sector of the town's economy, with a caravan park and numerous beach side shacks established. Recreational fishing is the largest draw to the town, with the jetty and boat ramp heavily used in the summer holidays. Other water based sports such as swimming and snorkelling are popular, with a large shark proof cage constructed on the side of the jetty. Swimming outside of this enclosure can be risky, as evident by a recent death caused by a large shark in the bay.

The local oyster industry has been the source of tourist attractions also, with guided tours now established.

== Community ==
The town has around 200 permanent residents, with that number swelling to around 1000 in the peak summer months. The small town has a very basic general store and petrol and diesel are occasionally available.

There is a sporting club north of the caravan park with an oval and tennis courts. The club serves meals and is open to the general public.

There is a single church, of the Uniting denomination opposite the caravan park. The town has a recently constructed boat ramp with a fee payable to Ceduna Council for its use. The old jetty, which has been shortened due to storm damage still stands, with the remnants of the original structure still standing off the end of the jetty.

Marilyns Country Music Festival is a unique annual event held in Smoky Bay, It is the only music event in the world using an Oyster Barge as a stage, Held in September this event attracts artists and patrons from all over Australia.

== Transport ==
Smoky Bay is accessed from the Flinders Highway, which runs along the coast of the Peninsula. Stateliner bus services also run buses to the town, with the town's station located opposite the general store.

The Streaky Bay and Ceduna airfields also offer flights to the area, however another form of transport must be found to get down to Smoky Bay.
