= The Ocean Fracture =

Scottish band

- Origin: Glasgow, Scotland, UK
- Genres: Post-hardcore, experimental rock
- Years active: 2004–2010
- Label: Eyes Of Sound,
- Members: Steven Gillies; Paul McArthur; Sean Campbell; Wes McCallum
- Website: www.myspace.com/theoceanfracture

The Ocean Fracture were a Scottish post-hardcore band based in Glasgow, comprising Steve Gillies (Vocals, guitar), Paul McArthur (Guitar, vocals, other), Wes McCallum (bass) and Sean Campbell (drums).

== History ==
The band formed in January 2004, and released one double A-sided single, a split with Bleaklow and one mini-album, The Sunmachine And The Ocean, which was released in September 2006 by Eyes Of Sound records.

During their tenure together, the band played or toured with many well-known UK acts, including Secondsmile, Devil Sold His Soul, Eden Maine and Sika Redem, amongst others.

The band completed work on three new tracks in February 2009, produced by Oliver Craggs (ex-Cubic Space Division) at his Hidden Track Studios in Folkestone, Kent. The tracks were planned to be released on a split EP with Kent noisecore band Rise Of Raphia, however Rise of Raphia disbanded before these plans could come to fruition. In June 2010 these tracks were finally released on a split EP with Sheffield post-metal act Black Fist.

In January 2010 The Ocean Fracture announced that Wes McCallum, of Glasgow math-rock outfit No Kilter, would be joining the band. The new line-up played their first show on 15 January with Irish rockers LaFaro.

In October 2010, The Ocean Fracture officially split up, releasing a retrospective compilation of unreleased demos for free digital download via their Facebook page.

== Post-Ocean Fracture projects ==
After the dissolution of The Ocean Fracture, guitarist Paul McArthur and bassist Wes McCallum formed experimental post-hardcore group Salò with former No Kilter drummer Sam Massey. Drummer Sean Campbell has gone on to play in post-hardcore acts Hunt/Gather and In Wrecks. Singer/guitarist Steven Gillies currently plays in Progressive Rock band Atlas : Empire & Post/Math Instrumental band, Dialects. Both bands have been releasing music & performing internationally for the last few years, including tours in Europe & North America. In late 2012, Paul and Sean reunited to form a noise rock band Thin Privilege, with Sean drumming and Paul on vocals.

== Discography ==
- In Azure Silence, In Azure Decay Ltd Edition EP (Self-released, 2005)
- The Sunmachine and the Ocean EP (EyesOfSound, 2006)
- "Cesarium/Black Lung Optimism" Single (Self-released, 2008)
- Bleaklow/The Ocean Fracture Split (Undergrad Records, 2010)

== Books ==
- A Noble Ocean Embiggens The Smallest Fracture: The Paul McArthur Story (Self-released, ltd. to one copy scrawled on the wall of a public toilet, 20Never)

== Members ==
- Steven Gillies (Vocals, guitar)
- Paul McArthur (Guitar, vocals)
- Sean Campbell (Drums)
- Wes McCallum (Bass)
