= Hundred of Horn =

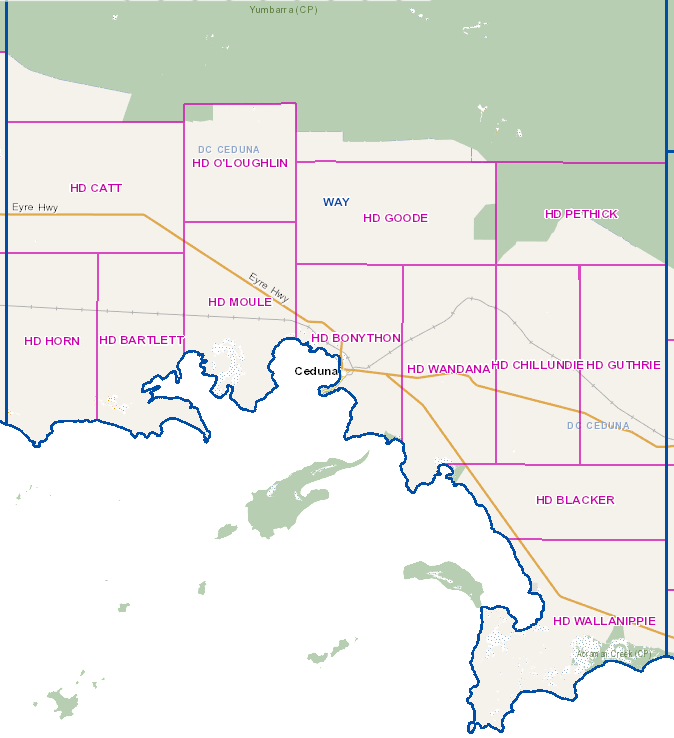
Map of the County of Way in South Australia

The Hundred of Horn is a cadastral hundred of South Australia located in the remote County of Way.

== Location ==
It overlooks the Great Australian Bight about 585 kilometres (364 miles) north-west of the Adelaide city centre and about 34 kilometres (21 miles) west of the town centre of Ceduna.

By one reading of the book Gulliver's Travels, the hundred would be the closest inhabited place to the location of the fictitious island of Lilliput

== History ==
The traditional owners of the area were the Wirangu Aboriginal people and the first European to sight the area was Dutch explorer Pieter Nuyts, in 1627 in the Gulden Zeepaard. The area is the limit of his map indicating he turned around at about this location.

In 1802 Matthew Flinders came past the district whilst on his voyage in the Investigator,

The Hundred of Horn (together with the Hundreds of Bartlett, Moule and Catt) were surveyed for closer settlement by William Richard Murray, E B Jones and H J Cant between Nov. 1888 and June 1889. The Hundred was named after William A Horn MP (1841-1922) and purchased Maryvale Station of Eyre Peninsula. The Hundred was proclaimed on 17 Jan 1889.
