= Hundred of O'Loughlin =

Cadastral hundred of South Australia

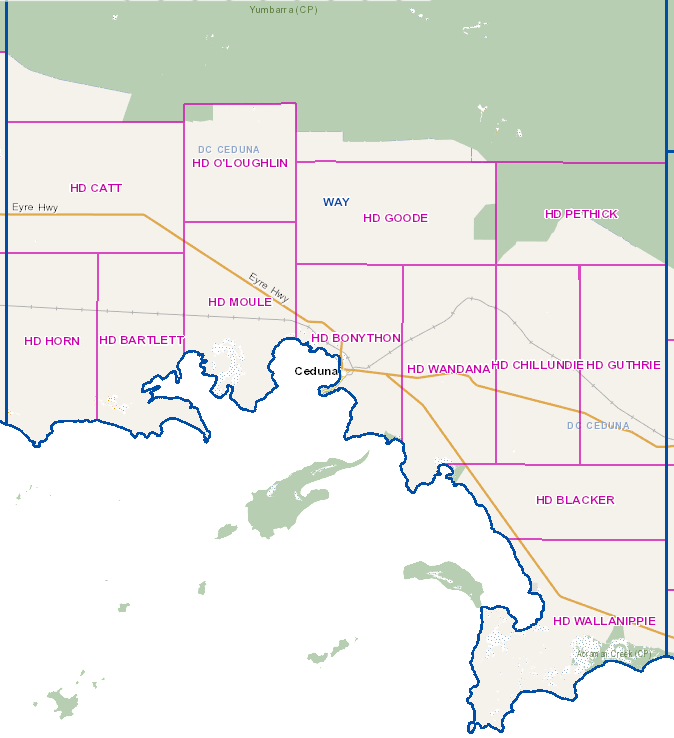
The Hundred of O'Loughlin is in the north west of the incorporated portion of the County of Way.

The Hundred of O'Loughlin is a cadastral hundred of South Australia established in 1898 in the remote County of Way.

The main town of the hundred is Koonibba which began life as an aboriginal mission. The traditional owners of the area are the Wirangu Aboriginal people though Mirning and Kokatha also live in the hundred now.
