= Tourville and Murat Bays Important Bird Area =

Coordinates: 32°08′37″S 133°29′41″E

Location of the Tourville and Murat Bays Important Bird Area in South Australia

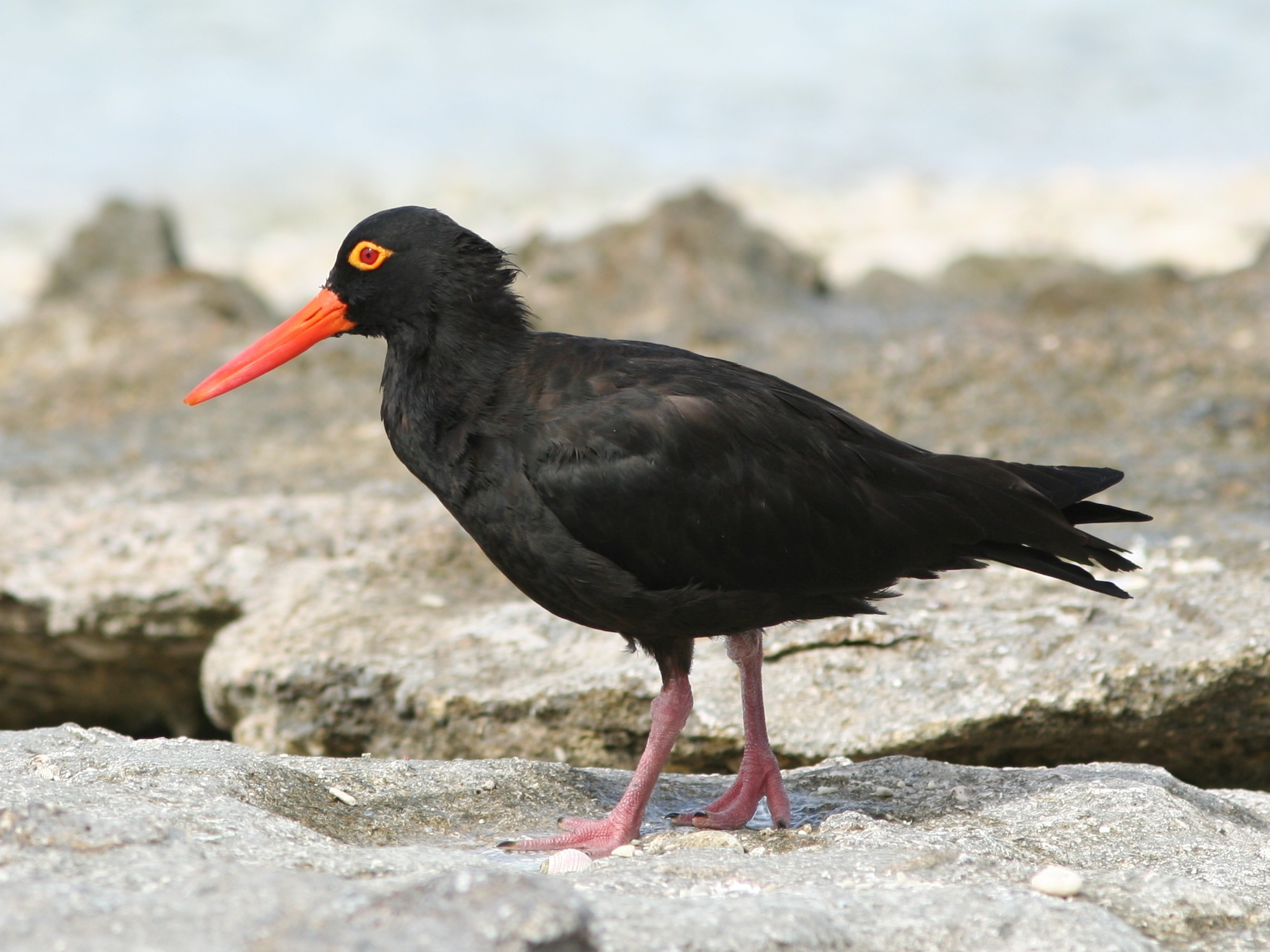
The IBA is an important site for sooty oystercatchers.

Tourville and Murat Bays Important Bird Area is an important bird area in South Australia with a combined area of 117 square kilometres (45 square miles), located west to the town of Ceduna on the north-west corner of the Eyre Peninsula in the Great Australian Bight. It is considered to be an important area because of the resident populations of waders, or shorebirds.

== Description ==
The Important Bird Area (IBA) consists of two separate areas - one on the west side of Murat Bay and the other covering the full extent of Tourville Bay. Both bays open to Denial Bay which itself is bounded by St Peter Island, a member of the Nuyts Archipelago, on its east side. Tourville Bay has a relatively narrow neck and contains extensive intertidal flats and saltmarsh. Murat Bay is more open to the sea. They are separated by about 10 kilometres (6.2 miles) of headland. The important bird area includes the intertidal zone and extends inland to take in other coastal features such as wetlands, including mangroves and playa lakes.

== Criteria for nomination as an IBA ==
The bays have been identified as an IBA by BirdLife International because, together, they support over 1% of the world populations of both pied and sooty oystercatchers. Other birds for which the site is important include common greenshanks, red knots, sharp-tailed sandpipers, banded lapwings, red-capped plovers and fairy terns. There are also records of hooded plovers, pied and great cormorants, and white-faced herons. rock parrots inhabit the saltmarsh.

== Associated protected areas ==
While the IBA has no statutory status, it does overlap part of the Nuyts Archipelago Marine Park, a marine protected area declared by the Government of South Australia.

== See also ==
- List of birds of South Australia
- Murat (disambiguation)
