= Murat Pasha Mosque, Antalya =

Ottoman mosque in Antalya, Turkey

Murat Paşa Mosque
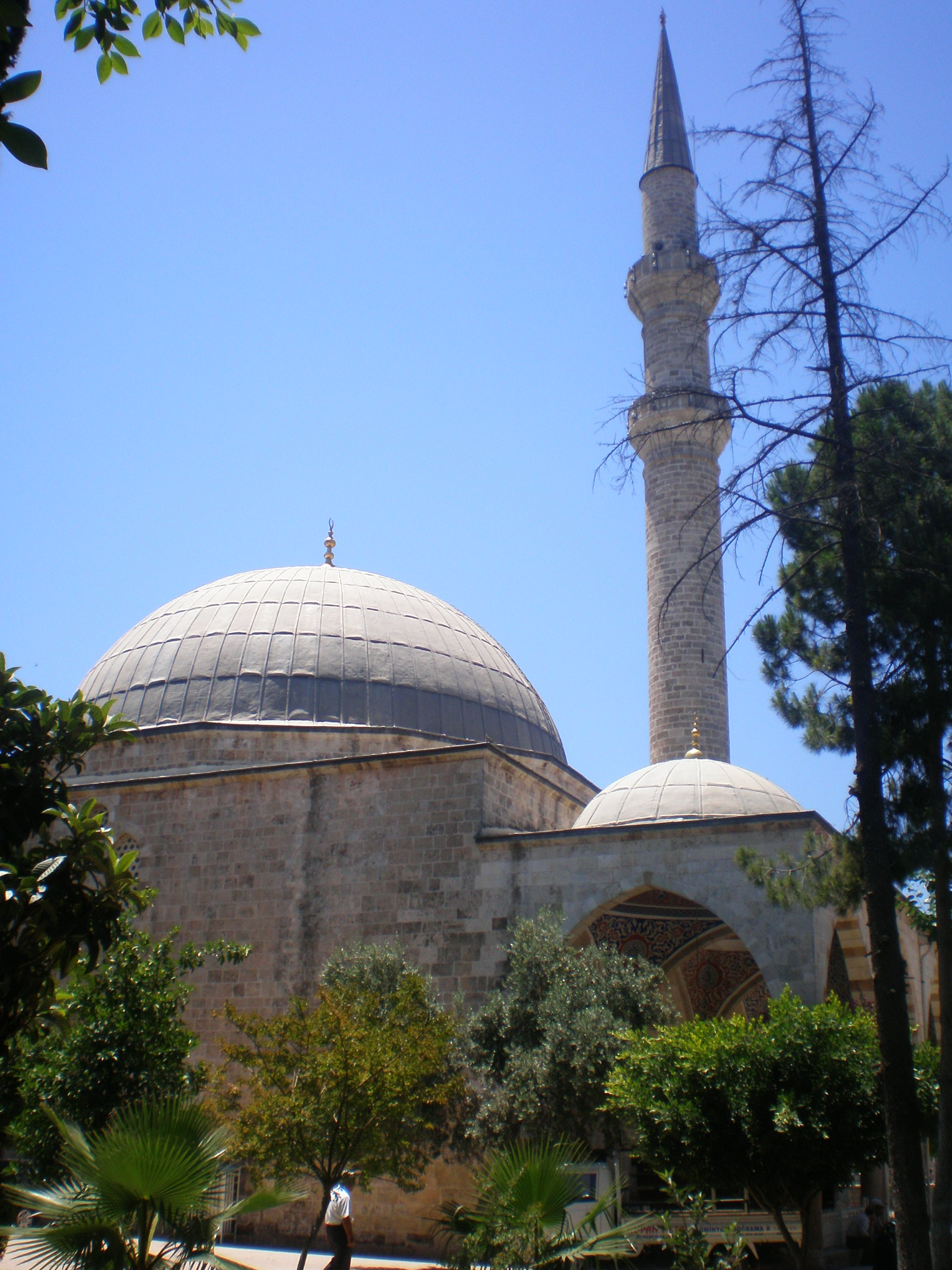

Religion
- Affiliation: Islam

Location
- Location: Muratpaşa, Antalya, Turkey
- Interactive map of Murat Paşa Mosque
- Coordinates: 36.8915°N 30.7025°E

Architecture
- Type: mosque
- Groundbreaking: 1570

Specifications
- Dome: 1+3
- Minaret: 1
- Materials: granite, marble

The Murat Paşa Mosque (Turkish: Murat Paşa Camii) is an Ottoman mosque in the Muratpaşa borough of Antalya, Turkey.

== Architecture ==
It was commissioned by Murat Pasha of Karaman (Turkish: Karaman Beyi Murat Paşa) in 1570 and is covered with a high dome upon a ten-corner frame, with the inscriptions on its inner walls running all through the internal façade in a ribbon while presenting the most beautiful example of the Turkish-Seljuk art of calligraphy. The altar next to the marble pulpit worked with reliefs is a simple construction. The last congregation place is covered with three domes rising above pointed arches of coloured stone on four round columns.

== See also ==
- List of mosques
- Ottoman architecture
