= Murat Gülsoy =

Turkish writer

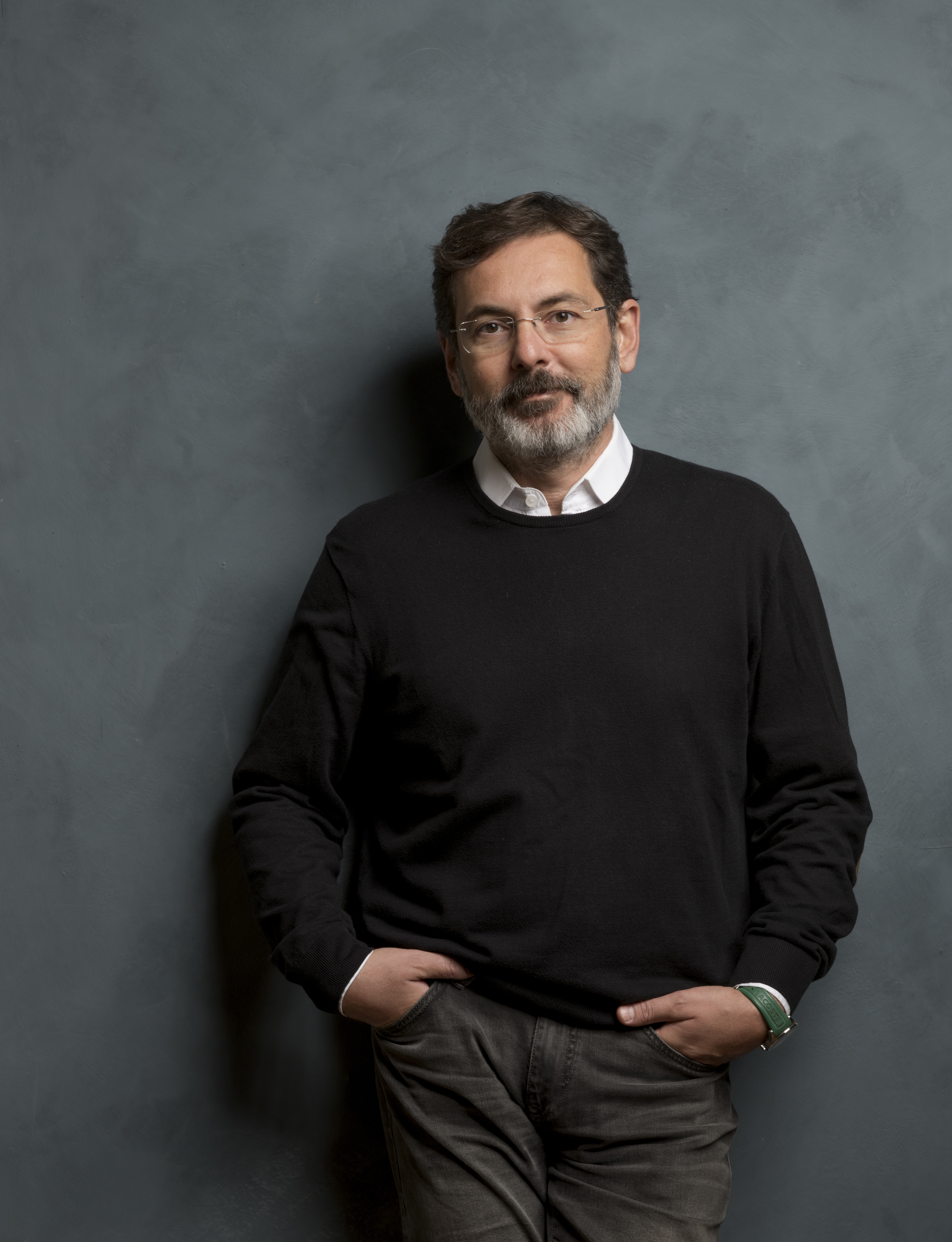
Murat Gülsoy

Murat Gülsoy (born 1967) is a Turkish writer. He started his literary career as a publisher and a writer of the bimonthly magazine Hayalet Gemi (Ghost Ship) in 1992. Since then, he has published 18 books. Besides short stories, he has novels addressing modern masters Kafka, Borges, Eco, Laurence Sterne, Fowles and Orhan Pamuk. He is the recipient of various prestigious national literary awards, and has given interviews in national media. He has been conducting creative writing workshops since 2004.

Besides being a writer, Gülsoy was also a professor Boğaziçi University's Institute of Biomedical Engineering. He headed the editorial board of Bogazici University Press and was the director of Bogazici University Nazım Hikmet Culture and Art Research Center. Stehlen Sie dieses Buch! is his first book to be translated into German (Literaturca Verlag). Some of his books have also been translated into Albanian, Arabic, Bulgarian, Chinese, English, Macedonian and Romanian. His 2000 Sait Faik Award-winning book "Bu Kitabı Çalın" (Steal This Book) "borrows" (or steals) its name from Abbie Hoffman's 1971 book "Steal This Book" and it is referred in the book as a postmodern parody.

== Translations ==
- Stehlen Sie dieses Buch!, Literaturca Verlag, 2007.
- Im Dunkeln, Wespennest 148, 2007.
- De man die dacht dat hij Orhan Pamuk Was, Moderne Turkse verhalen, Atlas, 2005.
- Crazy Old Man, Descant, 34:2, Sum 2003.
- “My Life’s a Lie,” in Contemporary Turkish Short Fiction (Ed. Suat Karantay), Çitlenbik Publications, 2009.
- “Marked in Writing” in The Book of Istanbul, (Ed. Jim Hinks & Gul Turner), Coma Press, 2010.
- “A Week of Kindness in Istanbul,” in Aeolian Visions / Versions, Modern Classics and New Writing from Turkey, (Ed. Mel Kenne, Saliha Paker, Amy Spangler), Milet Publishing, 2013
- “Versteck mich,” in Alles Blaue, alles Grüne dieser Welt, dtv Münhen, 2008.
