= Thevenard, South Australia =

Thevenard
- Town
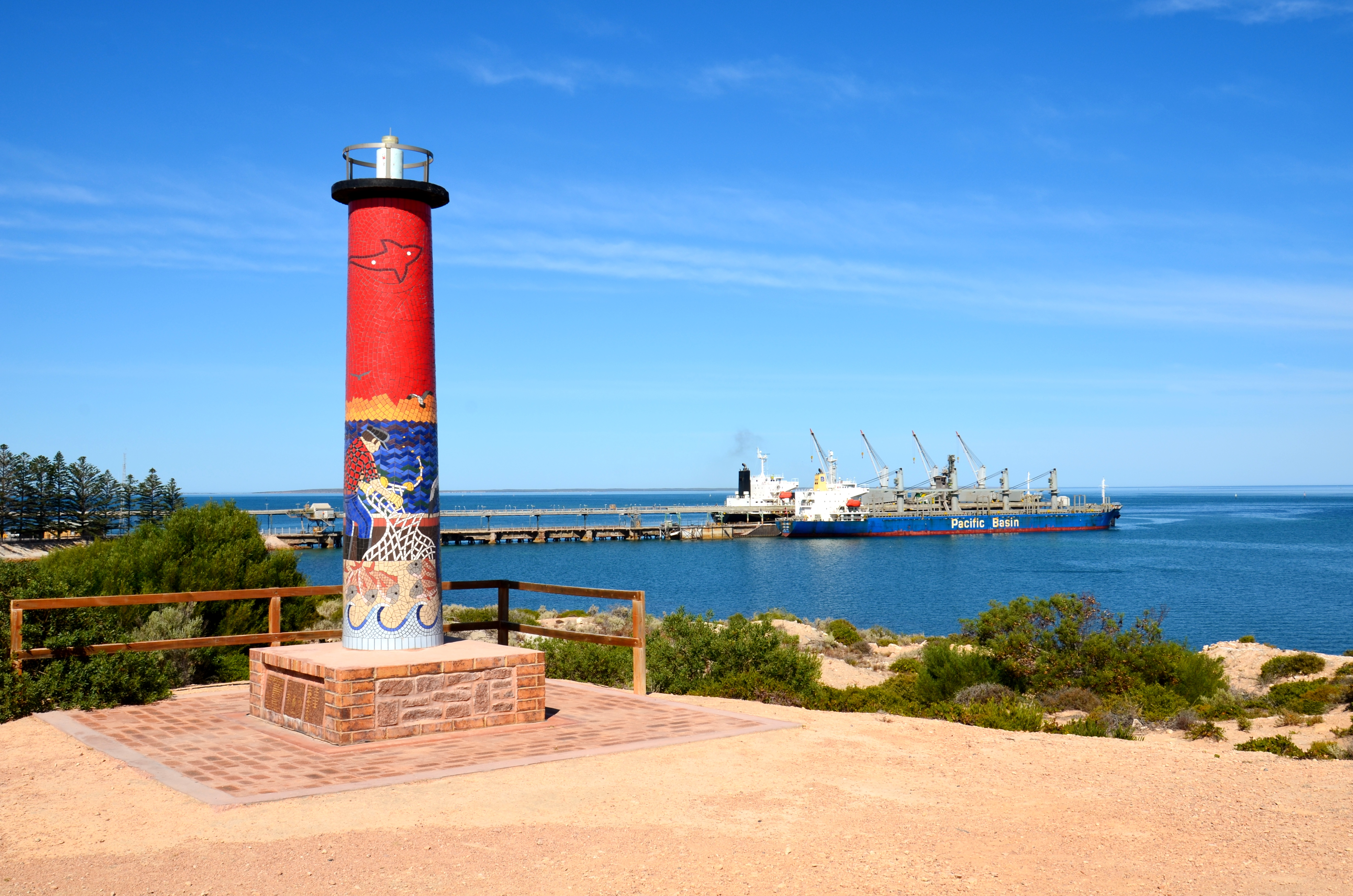
- Memorial at Pinky Point, Thevenard, commemorating people who have lost their lives at sea; ships at the jetty are loading gypsum

- Coordinates: 32°08′S 133°39′E
- Country: Australia
- State: South Australia
- LGA: District Council of Ceduna
- Location: 406 km (252 mi) NW of Port Lincoln
- Established: 1923

Government
  - State electorate: Flinders
  - Federal division: Grey

Population
  - Total: 563 (SAL 2021)
- Time zone: UTC+9:30 (ACST)
  - Summer (DST): UTC+10:30 (ACDT)
- Postcode: 5690
Localities around Thevenard
| ocean | ocean | ocean |
| ocean | Thevenard | Ceduna |
| ocean | ocean | ocean |

Thevenard (postcode 5690) is a port town in the far west of Eyre Peninsula, South Australia. It is contiguous with the larger town of Ceduna. Its name derives from nearby Cape Thevenard, which in turn was named after Antoine-Jean-Marie Thévenard, a French admiral. In the 2021 census, Thevenard had a population of 563.

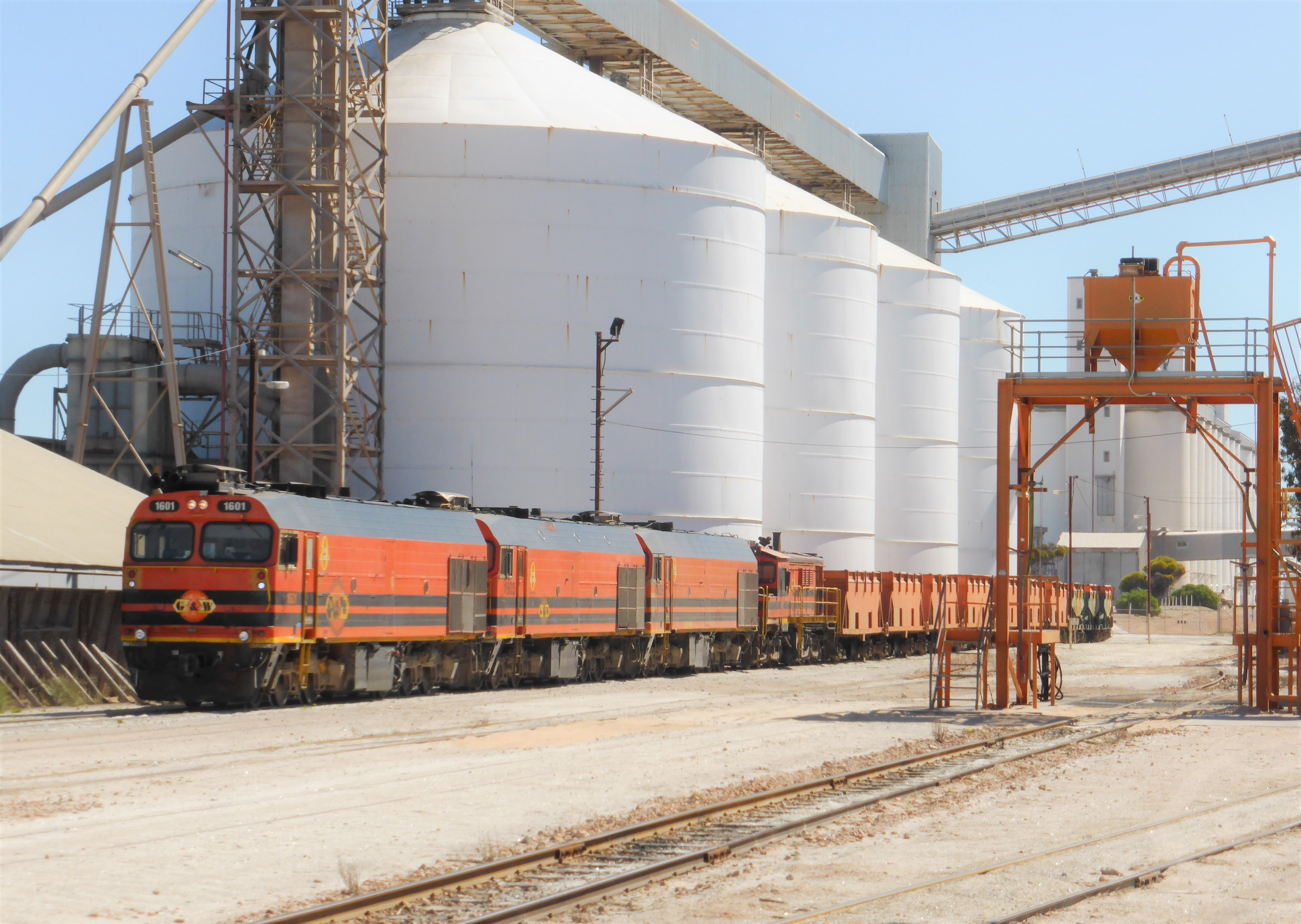
Three trains a day bring gypsum to Thevenard from Lake MacDonnell

The port handles bulk grain, gypsum, salt and zircon. Thevenard is a terminus of the privately operated Eyre Peninsula Railway, which delivers three trains of bulk gypsum daily from the Lake MacDonnell mine, 65 km (40 mi) to the west. Production from the mine, owned by Gypsum Resources Australia, is about 3,500,000 t (3,400,000 long tons; 3,900,000 short tons) per year.

Iluka Resources exports about 300,000 t (300,000 long tons; 330,000 short tons) of zircon concentrate from Thevenard per year, which the company mines and processes at the Jacinth Ambrosia Mine, 270 km (170 mi) north-west of Thevenard; delivery is by road.

The jetty has two berths, each capable of handling ships of 198 m (650 ft) length over all and 28 m (92 ft) beam, with a berthing pocket 30 m (98 ft) wide and 9.8 m (32 ft) deep. A gantry supports a load-out conveyor and a discharge boom with a travel length of 160 m (520 ft) capable of bulk loading grain at 750 t (740 long tons; 830 short tons) per hour and gypsum at 950 t (930 LT) per hour into ships' holds with a maximum outreach of 18 m (59 ft).

Thevenard is in the District Council of Ceduna local government area, the South Australian House of Assembly electoral district of Flinders and the Australian House of Representatives Division of Grey.

Greek immigration to Thevenard, especially by people in the fishing industry, has been important in shaping the town's culture. Greeks from Thevenard are believed to have introduced eating barramundi to Anglo-Celtic Australians.
