= Hundred of Bartlett =

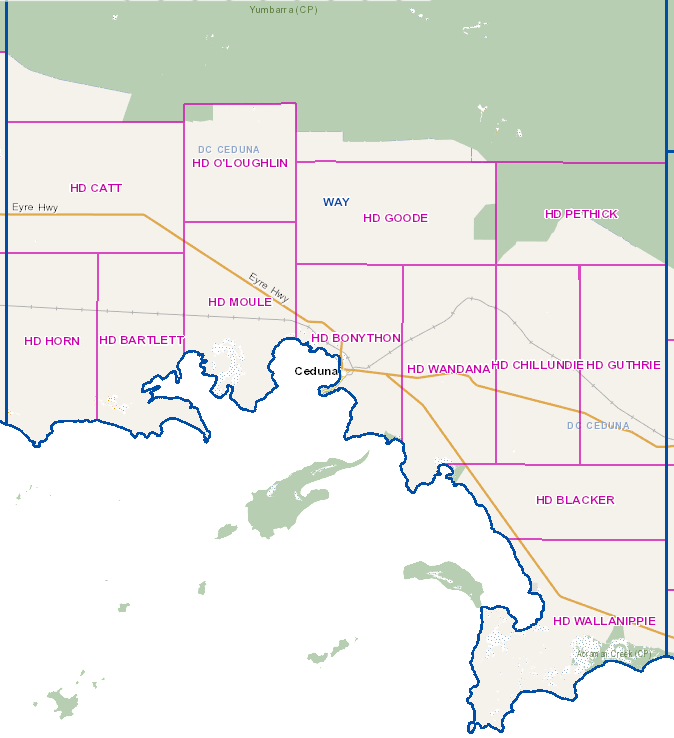
The Hundred of Bartlett is located on the south coast of the County of Way in South Australia.

The Hundred of Bartlett is a cadastral hundred of South Australia located in the remote County of Way. It was created in 1889.

== Location ==
It overlooking the Great Australian Bight about 584 kilometres (363 mi) north-west of the Adelaide city centre and about 33 kilometres (21 mi) west of the town centre of Ceduna.

By one reading of the book Gulliver's Travels, the hundred is the closest inhabited place to the location of the fictitious island of Lilliput.

== History ==
The traditional owners of the area were the Wirangu Aboriginal people and the first European to sight the area was Dutch explorer Pieter Nuyts in 1627 in the Gulden Zeepaard. In 1802 Matthew Flinders came past the district whilst on his voyage in the Investigator.

The Hundred of Bartlett (together with the Hundreds of Moule, Horn and Catt) were surveyed for closer settlement by William Richard Murray, E B Jones and H J Cant between Nov. 1888 and June 1889.
