= District Council of Ceduna =

Coordinates: 32°08′00″S 133°41′00″E

- Local government area
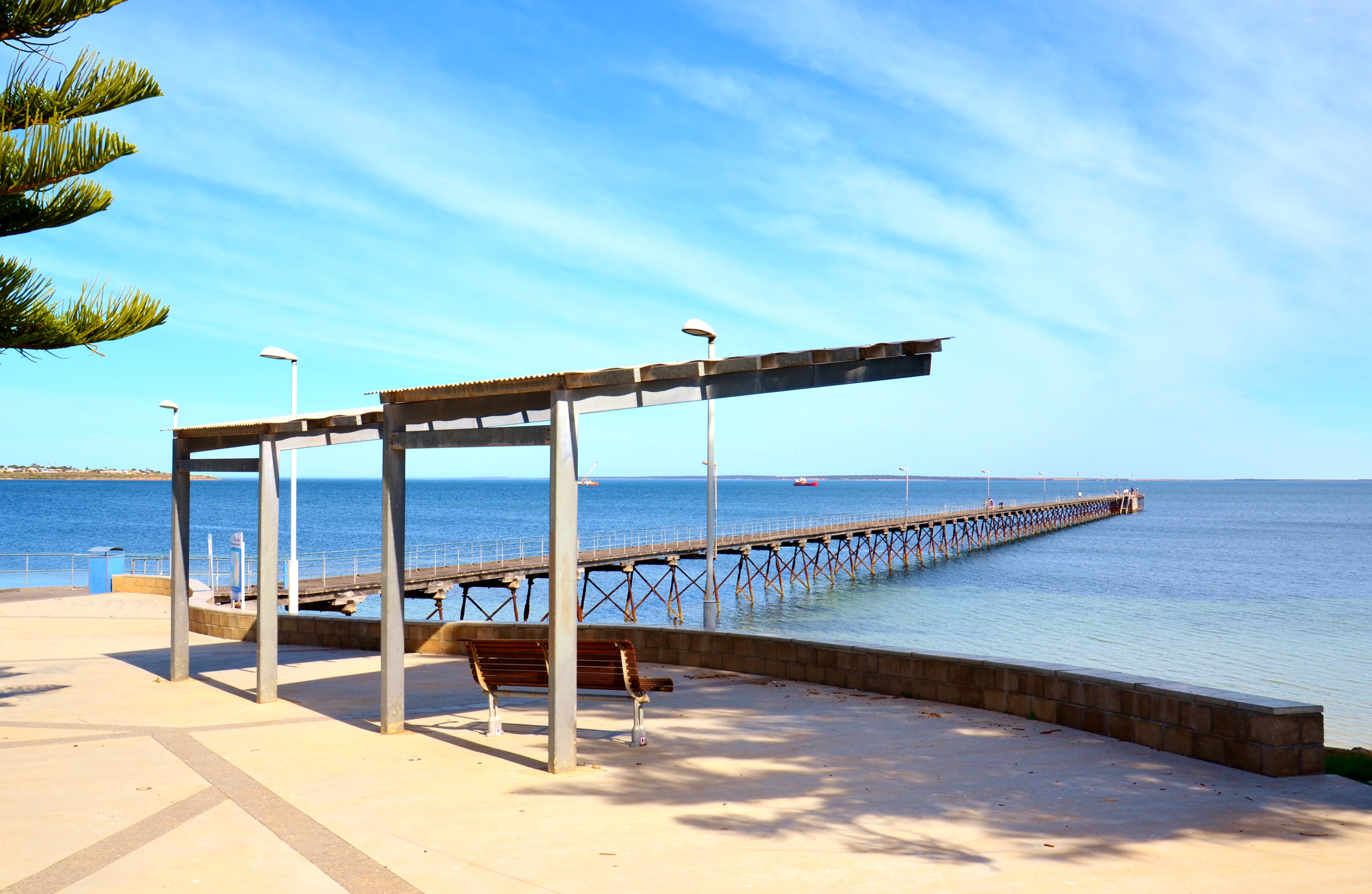
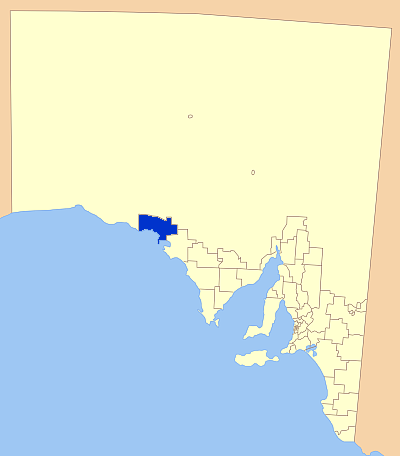
- Ceduna Jetty Location of the District Council of Ceduna

- Interactive map of District Council of Ceduna
- Country: Australia
- State: South Australia
- Region: Eyre and Western
- Established: 1896
- Council seat: Ceduna

Government
  - Mayor: Perry Will
  - State electorate: Flinders
  - Federal division: Grey

Area
  - Total: 5,427.1 km^{2} (2,095.4 sq mi)

Population
  - Total: 3,505 (LGA 2021)
- Website: District Council of Ceduna
LGAs around District Council of Ceduna
Outback Communities Authority	Outback Communities Authority	Outback Communities Authority
Outback Communities Authority	District Council of Ceduna	Streaky Bay
Southern Ocean	Southern Ocean	Streaky Bay

The District Council of Ceduna is a local government area located on the far west coast of the Eyre Peninsula in South Australia. The district has a diverse business and industry with an estimated 240,000 tourists passing through every year. The township of Ceduna is the focal point of the district.

== Industry and history ==
The land in the district has long been used for agricultural purposes, in fact, between the 1850s and 1880s, much of the land was one large sheep station. Now most blocks are around 9,000 acres (36 km^{2}) and mostly farming cereal crops such as wheat, oats and barley; as well as livestock, particularly sheep.

Port Thevenard has been an exporter of gypsum, salt, Grain and mineral sand, with up to 1.2 million tonnes of gypsum being exported per year.

Smoky Bay and Denial Bay have been growing oysters using aquaculture for over ten years now, with Denial and Smoky Bay now the second and third largest producing areas in the state respectively.

Tourism is also a large part of the districts economy, with Smoky Bay and Ceduna attracting the largest crowds. The area's attractions are largely to do with the marine environment, with fishing and whale watching popular.

The council was first established in 1925 as the District Council of Murat Bay. It was renamed the District Council of Ceduna in 1994.

== Localities ==
The town of Ceduna is the major town of the district; it also includes the localities of Ceduna Waters, Charra, Chinbingina, Denial Bay, Kalanbi, Koonibba, Laura Bay, Maltee, Merghiny, Mudamuckla, Nadia, Nunjikompita, Puntabie, Smoky Bay, Thevenard, Uworra, Wandana, Watraba, White Well Corner, and part of Carawa, Pimbaacla, Pureba and Yumbarra.

== Facilities ==
Ceduna contains all essential facilities including shopping centres, fuel stations, a hospital, an area school and a variety of accommodation. The smaller towns contain much less, with most having only a roadhouse and possibly a caravan park.

Recreational facilities include

- Library
- Boat Ramps & Marina
- Jetties

== Council ==
The District Council of Ceduna has a directly-elected mayor.

=== 2022 election results ===
2022 South Australian local elections: Ceduna
Party	Candidate	Votes	%	±%
Independent	Robert Sleep (elected)	238	21.6	
Independent Liberal	Paul Brown (elected)	160	14.5	
Independent Liberal	Anthony Nicholls (elected)	117	10.6	
Independent	Michele Jacobsen (elected)	114	10.3	
Independent Liberal	Geoff Ryan (elected)	104	9.4	
Independent	Janet Evans (elected)	104	9.4	
Independent	Joyce Brewster (elected)	89	8.1	
Independent	Hayley Nicholls (elected)	69	6.3	
Independent One Nation	Melanie Samsonenko	52	4.7	
Independent	Terena Evans	32	2.9	
Independent	Jane McGuinness	24	2.2	
Total formal votes		1,103	96.5	
Informal votes		40	3.5	
Turnout		1,143		

== Chairmen and Mayors of Murat Bay/Ceduna ==
- C. A. Tonkin (1925)
- George Owen Lovelock (1932-1941)
- Denis Edward Maloney (1941-1943)
- Edward Morley Borlase (1944-1946)
- Peter Sides Morrison (1946-1959)
- Clive Keitel (1959-1970)
- Jeffrey Charles Bergmann (1970-1981)
- Desmond Robert Whitmarsh (1981-1983)
- Jeffrey Charles Bergmann (1983-?)
- Malcolm Puckridge (1987-1998)
- Allan Suter (2006–present)

== See also ==
- List of parks and gardens in rural South Australia
