= Ceduna, South Australia =

Ceduna
- Town
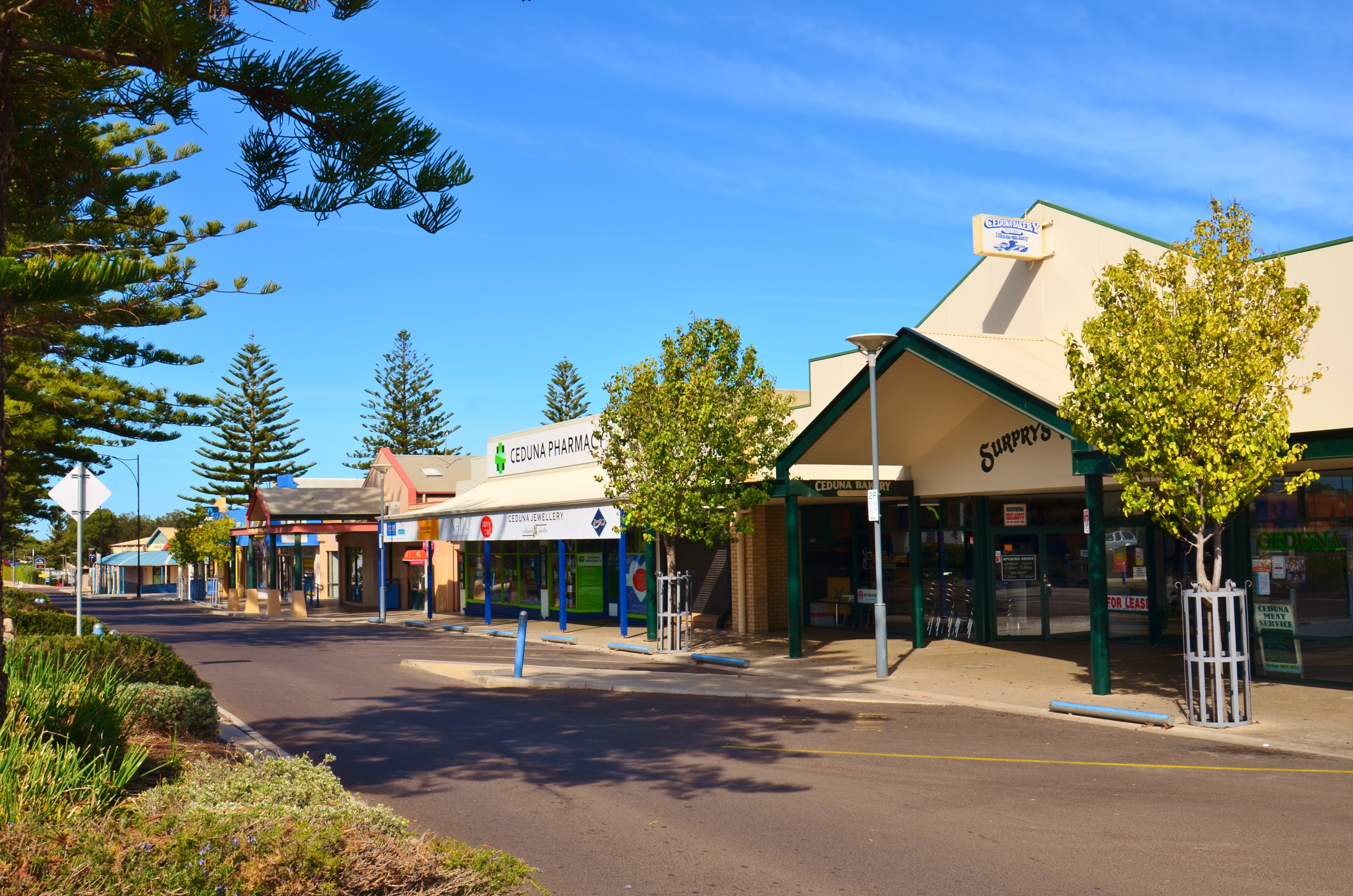
- Poynton Street, the main street of Ceduna

- Coordinates: 32°07′0″S 133°40′0″E
- Country: Australia
- State: South Australia
- LGA: District Council of Ceduna
- Location: 778 km (483 mi) NW of Adelaide; 423 km (263 mi) N of Port Lincoln
- Established: 1898

Government
  - State electorate: Flinders
  - Federal division: Grey

Population
  - Total: 2,290 (UCL 2021)
- Postcode: 5690
- Mean max temp: 24.0 °C (75.2 °F)
- Mean min temp: 10.8 °C (51.4 °F)
- Annual rainfall: 271.0 mm (10.67 in)
Localities around Ceduna
Koonibba; Uworra	Kalanbi	Wandana
Nadia; Charra	Ceduna	Merghiny
Denial Bay	Ceduna Waters	Laura Bay

Ceduna (/səˈdjuːnə/ sə-DEW-nə) is a town in South Australia located on the shores of Murat Bay on the coast, west of the Eyre Peninsula. It lies west of the junction of the Flinders and Eyre Highways around 786 km northwest of Adelaide. The nearby port of Thevenard lies 3 km to the west on Cape Thevenard. It is in the District Council of Ceduna, the federal electoral Division of Grey, and the state electoral district of Flinders.

The name Ceduna is a local Aboriginal Wirangu word, alternatively phoneticised as Chedoona, thought to mean a place to sit down and rest.

The town is a fishing port and a railway hub.

== History ==
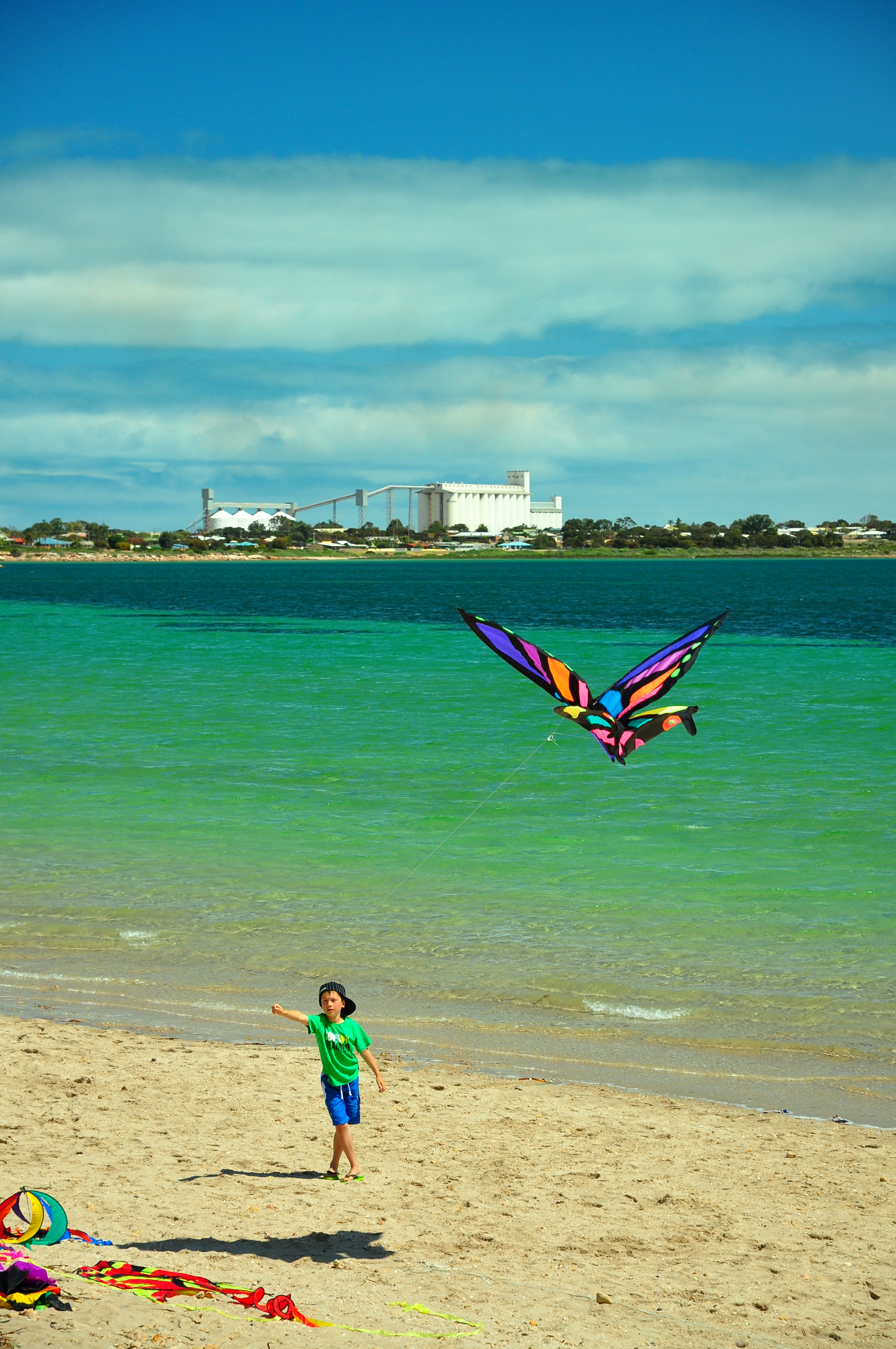
Murat Bay in Ceduna looking over to Thevenard during Oysterfest 2012

The Wirangu people once lived over the area including Ceduna. Sea level rise 18,000 to 7,500 years ago completely displaced inhabitants of previous coastal areas and resulted in dramatic changes in distributions of peoples.

Matthew Flinders, on his voyage in the Investigator, anchored in Fowlers Bay on 28 January 1802. He went on to explore the coast and named Denial Bay, Smoky Bay and the islands of Nuyts Archipelago. He was disappointed to find no river and gave the name Denial Bay because of "the deceptive hope we had formed of penetrating by it some distance into the interior of the country".

French expedition leader Nicolas Baudin visited Murat Bay after meeting with Flinders and named it after Joachim Murat. He also named the point of Thevenard after the Admiral and Minister of Marine Antoine-Jean-Marie Thevenard, and Decres Bay after Denis Decres, duke of the First French Empire.

The first European exploration of the hinterland was during August–September 1839 by John Hill and Samuel Stephens, using the chartered brig Rapid as a base. Hill reported to Governor Gawler that although the bay was "valuable", the hinterland was "waterless", thereby stalling European interest.

There was a whaling station on nearby St Peter Island during the 1850s before settlement.

The Commissioner of Crown Lands, faced with widespread agitation to open West Coast lands for agricultural settlement, invited three farmers in July 1887 to inspect the lands between Streaky Bay and Western Australia. They were optimistic about the area and recommended that the necessary surveys be started at once. In 1889 the Government in Adelaide formalised the Far West with survey lines.

On 20 June 1901, the Town of Ceduna was proclaimed. For many years, locals called the township Murat Bay and it was not until the railways came and called the siding Ceduna in 1915 that locals adopted the name. The Ceduna Jetty was built in 1902.

The Tod Water pipeline was officially opened by Mr M McIntosh, Commissioner of Public Works, June 1928.

Ceduna was the site of a major satellite telecommunications facility operated by the Overseas Telecommunications Commission. It was a major employer in the town until made redundant by technological change. It was built in 1969 and by 1984 almost half of Australia's International telecommunication traffic passed through Ceduna's Earth Station. The dish is now operated remotely and used as a radio astronomy observatory by the University of Tasmania.

On 4 December 2002, Ceduna received international attention when the path of totality of a solar eclipse passed directly over the town. Though the day had at times been partly cloudy, and although mere kilometres away in Thevenard the view was still clouded over, the southwestern sky where the Sun and Moon were located was clear from Ceduna itself at the time of the total solar eclipse, late in the afternoon.

In the 2007/2008 state budget, Premier Mike Rann (who had opened the new Ceduna TAFE campus in the early 1990s) announced a commitment of $36 million for Stage 1 of the Ceduna Hospital Redevelopment. It was opened in 2011.

In February 2010 Premier Mike Rann opened the world's largest mineral sands mine, Jacinth-Ambrosia Mine, operated by Iluka Resources. The $390 million mine is located 200 km north west of Ceduna.

== Population ==
According to the 2021 census of Population, there were 1959 people in Ceduna.

- Aboriginal and Torres Strait Islander people made up 26.4% of the population.
- 79.2% of people were born in Australia and 82.1% of people spoke only English at home.
- The most common response for religion was No Religion at 33.7%.

== Description ==
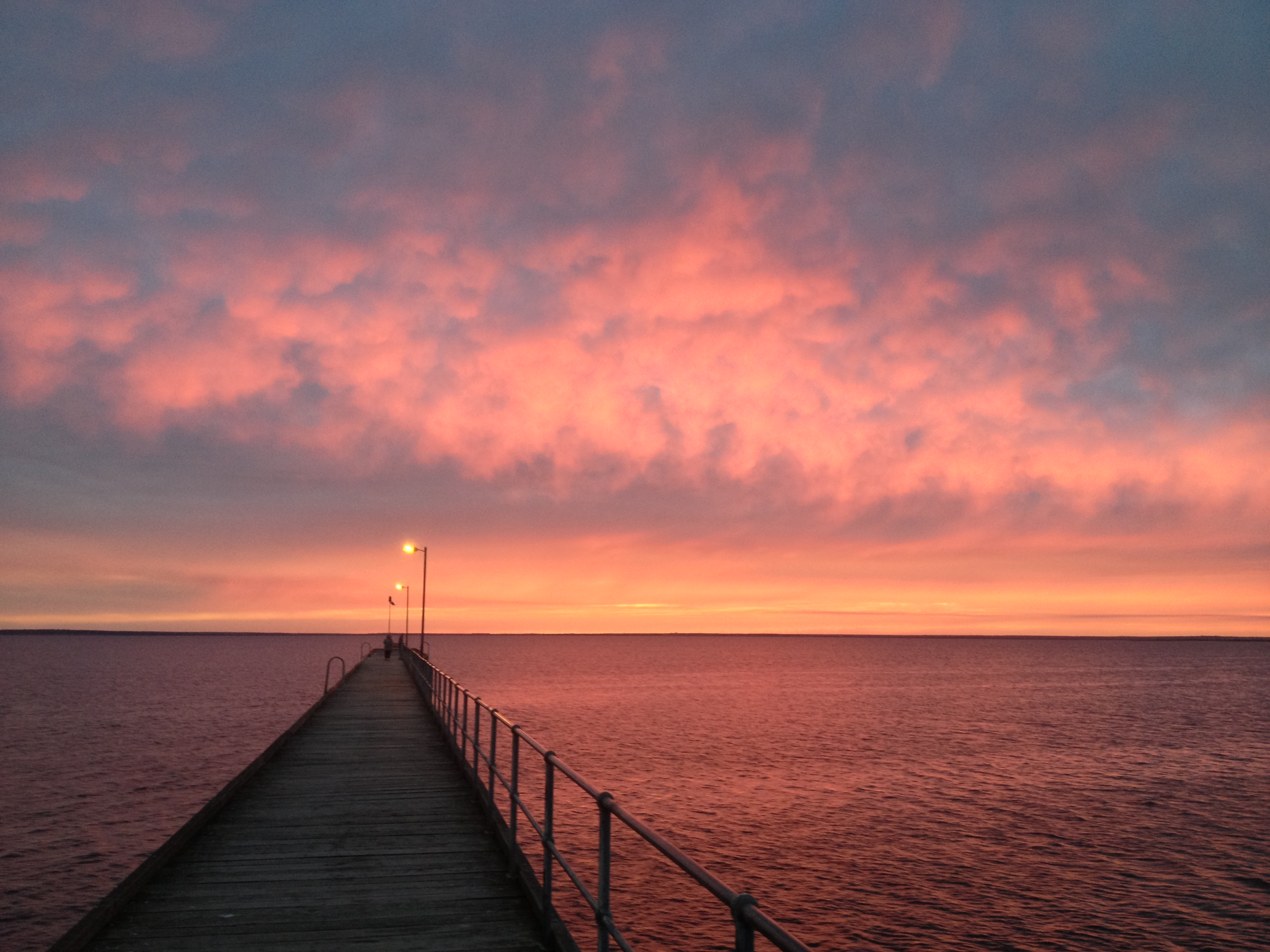
Ceduna, South Australia jetty in autumn

The town is the last major settlement before crossing the Nullarbor Plain from east to west. It is set on Murat Bay and the sandy coves, sheltered bays and offshore islands of the bay make it a popular base for a beach holiday. The foreshore at Ceduna is lined with Norfolk Island pine trees. There is a jetty for walking, fishing and small boats.

=== Demographics ===
In the 2011 census, the Ceduna urban area had a population of 2,289, and the Ceduna council area a population of 3,480.

Ceduna has a number of Indigenous homelands situated within 20–30 minutes of the town. The council area has 911 Aboriginal residents who make up 24.8% of residents, the highest proportion of Aboriginal people of all local government areas in South Australia. Ceduna is also a service centre for a number of Aboriginal communities in adjacent unincorporated areas. Very few of the indigenous inhabitants of Ceduna speak the local Wirangu language. As the regional service town, Ceduna attracts people from many indigenous groups in western South Australia. The Far West Languages Centre (FWLC) was established in 2006 to maintain three local Endangered languages including Wirangu, along with Mirning and Kokatha.

=== Education ===
The two schools in Ceduna are Ceduna Area School (CAS) and Crossways Lutheran School. CAS has approximately 600 students, from Reception to Year 12, with approximately 25% of Indigenous students. Crossways has around 150 students from Reception to Year 10, approximately 80% of whom are Indigenous.

=== Economic activity ===
Iluka Resources developed a mineral sands mine at Jacinth- Ambrosia which relies on Ceduna as a service town. A major residential development called Ceduna Waters was developed by Carramatta Holdings, a significant South Australian property developer in early 2010. Ceduna Waters is approximately 3 km from the town centre and is approximately 30% occupied as of May 2013.

Prospectively, the development was projected to result in the growth of the population of Ceduna by over 10%. The development will allow for the provision of additional residential accommodation in Ceduna to meet the needs of workers at the Jacinth-Ambrosia mine.

The Thevenard port of Ceduna is a high-frequency deep sea port which exports grain, salt, mineral sand and gypsum, all which are found within the local region.

Aquaculture remains a major industry in Ceduna with pacific oyster growing a key activity in the region. In recent years deep sea fishing and tuna fishing have attracted industries from Port Lincoln to the region.

In 2012, BP commenced the ability to seek approval for oil drilling off the nearby Great Australian Bight. BP is currently investing $20 million into a study of the region's ecosystem and social and economic potential.

=== Scientific research ===
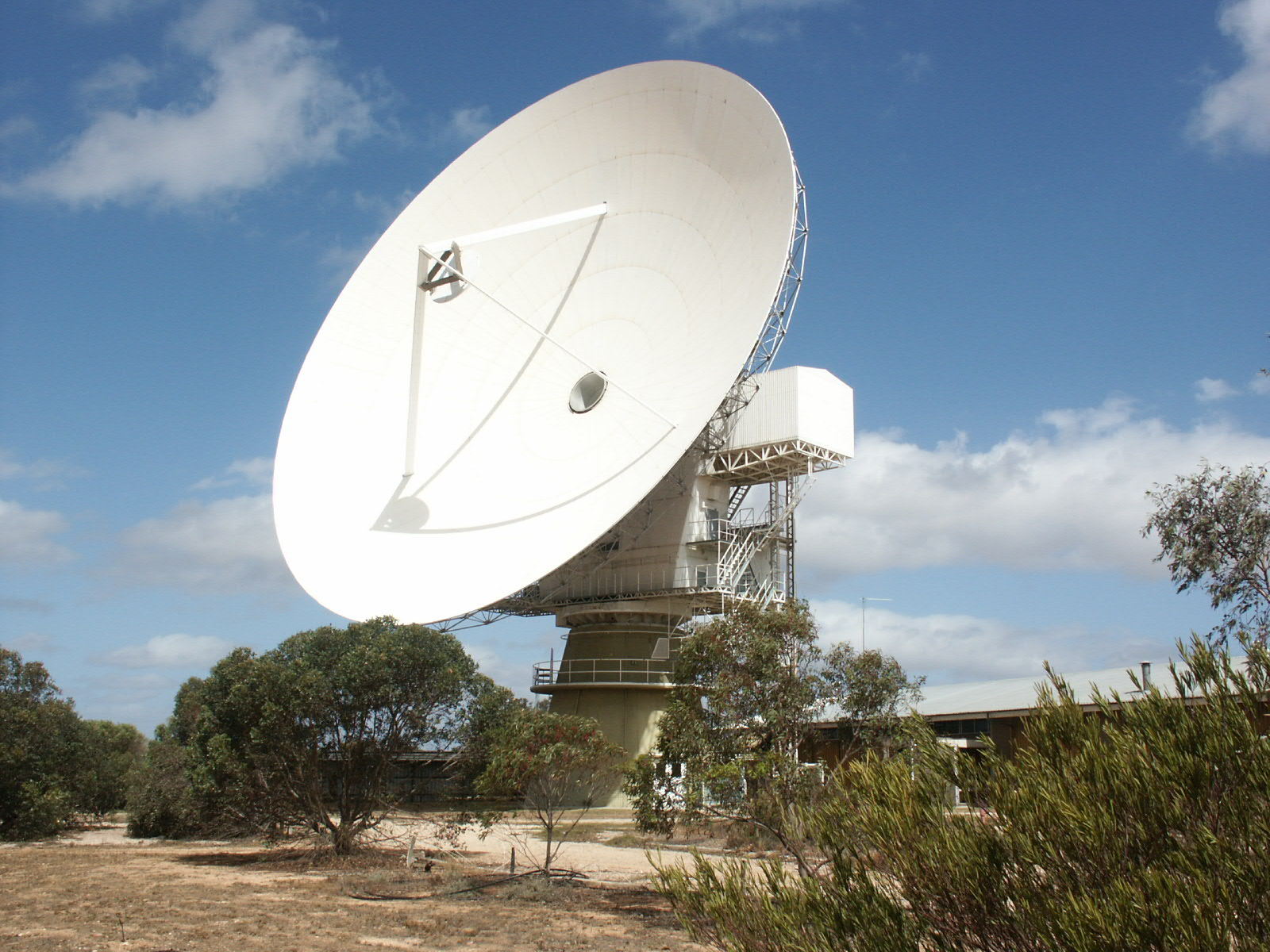
Former OTC dish, now used for radio astronomy

Ceduna has a radio telescope that is integrated into the CSIRO radio telescope network. Telstra donated the dish to the University of Tasmania in 1996 for use as a radio astronomy observatory. It is still in active use.

Ceduna is also a hub for research on southern bluefin tuna and is ideally located data collection through methods including aerial spotting.

=== Cultural festivals ===
Ceduna's annual Oysterfest is a major attraction held on the South Australia Labour Day long weekend. It was established in 1991. Attracting over 6000 people, it celebrates the oyster industry in the clean waters of SA's far-west coast, with a wide variety of activities, including a gala dinner, celebrity chefs, live concerts, children's amusements and a street parade. The finale is marked by a fireworks display.

=== In media ===
Ceduna was used as a major filming location for the 1997 film Kiss or Kill starring Frances O'Connor. It was a key setting for the factual drama Black and White although the township was not used as a filming location. In 2012 Ceduna was featured in the independent feature film Nullarbor Nymph which achieved cult status around the country.

The Cashless Welfare Card began a trial there in March 2016, attracting media attention.

Ceduna AMO, South Australia, Australia

Climate chart (precipitation, max. and min. temperature)
J	F	M	A	M	J	J	A	S	O	N	D
16 29 16	12 29 16	14 27 14	18 25 11	25 21 9	34 18 7	32 18 6	32 19 6	26 22 8	26 25 11	15 27 13	22 28 15
- █ Average max. and min. temperatures in °C
- █ Precipitation totals in mm
Imperial conversion
J	F	M	A	M	J	J	A	S	O	N	D
0.6 84 61	0.5 84 60	0.5 80 56	0.7 77 52	1 70 48	1.3 65 44	1.3 64 43	1.3 67 43	1 72 47	1 76 51	0.6 80 55	0.9 82 58
- █ Average max. and min. temperatures in °F
- █ Precipitation totals in inches

=== Tourism ===
Ceduna is known as the gateway to the Nullarbor Plain and being on the National Highway it experiences high levels on traffic despite its remote location. Daily traffic flow reaches around 2,200 to 3,000 vehicles per day opposite the Ceduna Hospital which is located directly on the Eyre Highway. The township has five caravan parks, four motels and one accommodating hotel. The tourism industry is driven by the nearby conservation parks, beaches and fishing opportunities.

== Environment ==
=== Climate ===
Ceduna experiences a cold semi-arid climate (Köppen: BSk, Trewartha: BSal), with warm, dry summers; mild to warm, dry springs and autumns; and mild, relatively dry winters. June is the wettest month. The average yearly precipitation is just under 300mm at the coast and diminishes northward into the interior, becoming increasingly arid. Goyder's Line, which demarcates the edge of the area where rainfall is generally sufficient to support agriculture, starts near Ceduna. On 26 January 2026, the maximum temperature of 49.5 °C was recorded.

Climate data for Ceduna (32º07'48"S, 133º42'00"E, 15 m AMSL) (1991–2020 normals, extremes 1939–2024)
Month	Jan	Feb	Mar	Apr	May	Jun	Jul	Aug	Sep	Oct	Nov	Dec	Year
Record high °C (°F)	49.5 (121.1)	47.3 (117.1)	45.8 (114.4)	41.3 (106.3)	34.0 (93.2)	29.8 (85.6)	32.6 (90.7)	34.3 (93.7)	39.8 (103.6)	43.5 (110.3)	46.5 (115.7)	48.9 (120.0)	49.5 (121.1)
Mean maximum °C (°F)	44.6 (112.3)	42.8 (109.0)	39.5 (103.1)	35.5 (95.9)	29.5 (85.1)	24.4 (75.9)	24.5 (76.1)	28.2 (82.8)	33.4 (92.1)	38.0 (100.4)	40.9 (105.6)	42.1 (107.8)	45.5 (113.9)
Mean daily maximum °C (°F)	29.0 (84.2)	28.8 (83.8)	26.9 (80.4)	24.8 (76.6)	21.2 (70.2)	18.4 (65.1)	18.0 (64.4)	19.3 (66.7)	22.2 (72.0)	24.7 (76.5)	26.5 (79.7)	27.8 (82.0)	24.0 (75.1)
Daily mean °C (°F)	22.5 (72.5)	22.2 (72.0)	20.2 (68.4)	17.9 (64.2)	15.0 (59.0)	12.5 (54.5)	12.0 (53.6)	12.8 (55.0)	15.2 (59.4)	17.7 (63.9)	19.6 (67.3)	21.2 (70.2)	17.4 (63.3)
Mean daily minimum °C (°F)	15.9 (60.6)	15.6 (60.1)	13.5 (56.3)	10.9 (51.6)	8.7 (47.7)	6.5 (43.7)	5.9 (42.6)	6.2 (43.2)	8.1 (46.6)	10.7 (51.3)	12.7 (54.9)	14.6 (58.3)	10.8 (51.4)
Mean minimum °C (°F)	8.9 (48.0)	8.9 (48.0)	6.1 (43.0)	4.0 (39.2)	2.2 (36.0)	0.5 (32.9)	0.1 (32.2)	−0.1 (31.8)	1.2 (34.2)	2.5 (36.5)	4.6 (40.3)	6.8 (44.2)	−1.2 (29.8)
Record low °C (°F)	5.0 (41.0)	4.9 (40.8)	1.3 (34.3)	−0.3 (31.5)	−3.2 (26.2)	−4.7 (23.5)	−4.3 (24.3)	−3.3 (26.1)	−1.8 (28.8)	−0.4 (31.3)	1.6 (34.9)	3.4 (38.1)	−4.7 (23.5)
Average precipitation mm (inches)	15.9 (0.63)	12.3 (0.48)	13.7 (0.54)	17.6 (0.69)	25.2 (0.99)	33.7 (1.33)	32.3 (1.27)	32.1 (1.26)	25.6 (1.01)	25.8 (1.02)	14.8 (0.58)	21.9 (0.86)	271.0 (10.67)
Average precipitation days (≥ 1.0 mm)	2.1	1.6	2.3	3.5	5.2	6.7	7.1	6.3	4.8	3.5	2.9	3.0	49.0
Average afternoon relative humidity (%)	45	45	44	44	47	51	51	47	46	43	43	44	46
Average dew point °C (°F)	11.5 (52.7)	11.7 (53.1)	9.8 (49.6)	8.3 (46.9)	7.0 (44.6)	6.3 (43.3)	5.4 (41.7)	4.7 (40.5)	5.9 (42.6)	5.5 (41.9)	7.8 (46.0)	9.8 (49.6)	7.8 (46.0)
Mean monthly sunshine hours	331.7	276.9	275.9	234.0	207.7	189.0	210.8	244.9	246.0	275.9	291.0	306.9	3,090.7
Percentage possible sunshine	77	74	73	69	64	62	66	72	69	69	70	70	70
Source 1: Bureau of Meteorology (1939-2025 normals, extremes 1939–2026)
Source 2: Australian Broadcasting Corporation

== Notable people ==
- Jenny Borlase (née Kennett), former netballer, born in Ceduna
- Freda Evelyn Gibson (1908–1977), an Australian flying doctor based here
- Scott Lycett, professional AFL footballer playing for Port Adelaide Football Club
- Jodi Martin, singer/songwriter, born and raised in Ceduna
- Terry Milera, professional AFL footballer who played for St Kilda Football Club
- Tyson Stengle, professional AFL footballer playing for Adelaide Football Club
- Chris Sperou, aerobatic pilot, born in Ceduna in 1938
- Kade Chandler, professional AFL footballer playing for Melbourne Football Club

== See also ==
- Ceduna Airport
- Point Bell Conservation Park
