= New Venice School =

The New Venice School is a movement in contemporary music in Venice from the 1970s to the present, made up of composers directly influenced by teachings at the Venice Conservatory (Conservatorio Benedetto Marcello) of the distinguished composer and pedagogue Baron Ernesto Rubin de Cervin (Albrizzi) (born 1936), who studied under Luigi Dallapiccola in Florence and Goffredo Petrassi in Rome. His many students include the composer and conductor Giuseppe Sinopoli (1946–2001); the composer and teacher Marino Baratello (born 1953); the composer Claudio Ambrosini (born 1948); and the Amsterdam-based, English composer Geoffrey King (born 1949). Although not directly influenced by the legacy of Rubin de Cervin and the above-listed lineage, other Venetian composers were influential in the development of new music in Venice, namely Bruno Maderna (1920–1973) and Luigi Nono (1924–1990).

== Style ==
There is no specific musical style that characterizes the music of the New Venice movement: their music is varied and includes influences from serialism (e.g., the music of Rubin de Cervin and his disciple, Sinopoli) and musical elements from jazz are evident (e.g., the music of Baratello) with a strong emphasis on modern polyphony. Indeed, their influences include the indigenous history of Venetian music, including the influence of Arnold Schoenberg and the Second Viennese School; and experimental serial and post-serial developments at Darmstadt, specifically the music of Karlheinz Stockhausen.
