= Artashes Emin =

Armenian translator (born 1961)

Artashes Emin Արտաշես Էմին
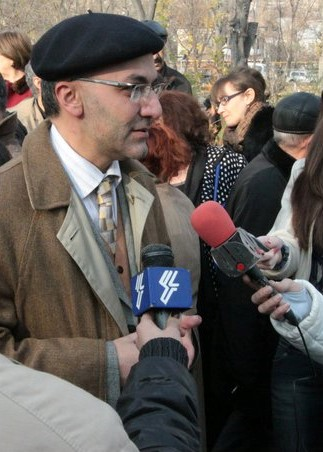
- Artashes Emin being interviewed during the dedication ceremony of the statue of Gevorg Emin at Lovers' Park on December 11, 2010.
- Born: January 4, 1961; Yerevan, Armenian SSR, USSR
- Education: Yerevan State University (BA), (ABD); American University of Armenia (LL.M.)
- Occupation: Translator
- Parent: Gevorg Emin (father)
- Relatives: Vazgen Muradian (uncle); Vago Muradian (cousin)

Artashes Emin (Armenian: Արտաշես Էմին, born January 4, 1961) is an Armenian translator and essayist. He is a member of the Writers Union of Armenia, International Association of Conference Interpreters (2005), Armenian Conference Interpreters Association (ACIA), Armenian P.E.N. Centre, and Oral History Association. He is a Merited Artist of Armenia (2015) who served as Honorary Consul of Canada in Armenia from 1997 to 2019.

== Biography ==
Born in the family of poet Gevorg Emin, he graduated from Yerevan State University's Faculty of Romance and Germanic Philology (cum laude) in 1982, completing post-graduate studies in 1986 as a doctoral candidate in comparative literature. At YSU he was the director of the William Saroyan Heritage Centre from 1986 to 1992. In 1992 he became the bureau manager of the Canadian Representation in Armenia. Emin lectured at the University of Michigan and Harvard University under the Fulbright Program from 1994 to 1995. Upon his return to Armenia, he founded Babylon Interpretation Agency in 1996, which specializes in providing simultaneous interpreters. He was appointed as honorary consul of Canada to Armenia in 1997, maintaining that role until 2019. He also served as the general secretary of the Armenian P.E.N. Centre from 1990 to 1998. In 1999, he graduated as a Master of Law from the American University of Armenia, School of Law. He was one of the victors on the popular Russian-language intellectual game show What? Where? When? during the March 27, 2010 episode.

== Work as interpreter ==
Since 1988 provided simultaneous interpretation between Armenian, English and Russian for numerous international institutions (sampling): Council of Europe, IMF, PACE, European Commission, European Parliament, OSCE, UNDP, UNHCR, UNICEF, UNFPA, FAO, WFP, WHO, OXFAM, OCHA, Fitch Ratings, Standard & Poor’s, PricewaterhouseCoopers, Ernst and Young, Central Bank of Armenia, Federal Reserve System, Central Bank of Russia, Amnesty International, Transparency International, FBI, GIGN, NATO, DTRA, IAEA, ISTC, Deloitte and Touche, Armenian Academy of Sciences, Philip Morris, BMW, Pernod Ricard, Hublot, LVMH, US Department of State, USA Today, World Customs Organization, FIDE, Asian Development Bank, World Wildlife Fund, American Bar Association, Eurasia Foundation, EBRD, Catholic Relief Services, IREX, World Council of Churches, HALO Trust, Peace Corps, World Vision, HSBC, UNESCO, Basel Committee on Banking Supervision, Smithsonian etc.

During this period he interpreted a variety of interdisciplinary topics on Chemistry, Genetics, Ophthalmology, Neurology, Neurosurgery, Cardiology, Pediatrics, Urban Planning, Post-Modernism, Roman Baroque Art, Genocide Prevention, Criminal Justice, Renewable Energy, Innovation, Internal audit, Seismology, Ecumenism, Disaster Risk Reduction, etc.

== List of published works ==
=== English to Armenian ===
- Edgar Allan Poe, Nightmares and Slumbers (tales), Yerevan, Sov. Grogh. 1983;
- George Orwell, Animal Farm, Yerevan, Apollon, 1991;
- William Golding, Lord of the Flies, Pincher Martin, Yerevan, Sov. Grogh. 1990;
- William Saroyan, Plays, short stories and memoirs in Selected works in IV vols. Yerevan, Sov. Grogh. 1987–91;
- Arthur Miller, Death of a Salesman, in 20th century drama, vol. III, Yerevan University Press 1992;
- Diana Der Hovanessian, Inside Green Eyes Black Eyes (poems), Yerevan, Sov. Grogh. 1986;
- Harold Pinter's The Lover
- Thomas Pynchon, Gravity's Rainbow, Yerevan, Antares, 2022

To be published in 2020:

- Thornton Wilder, The Bridge of San Luis Rey, Yerevan, Antares
- River of Names, A collection of 26 American Short Stories, Yerevan, Antares

=== English to Russian ===
- Trevanian, Shibumi, Yerevan, Urartu #138-160, 1995–1996;
- Trevanian, Hot Night in the City, Yerevan, Hairapet 2011
- Jack Hashian, Mamigon, Moscow, Prestige Books 2018

=== Armenian to English ===
- Nairi Zarian, Davit of Sassoun, Yerevan, Hairapet 2012

=== Russian to English ===
- Platon Zubov, The Astrologer of Karabagh, ACF, Arlington 2012
