= Conservatorio di Musica Benedetto Marcello di Venezia =

Conservatory in Venice, Italy

Coordinates: 45.43236°N 12.33053°E

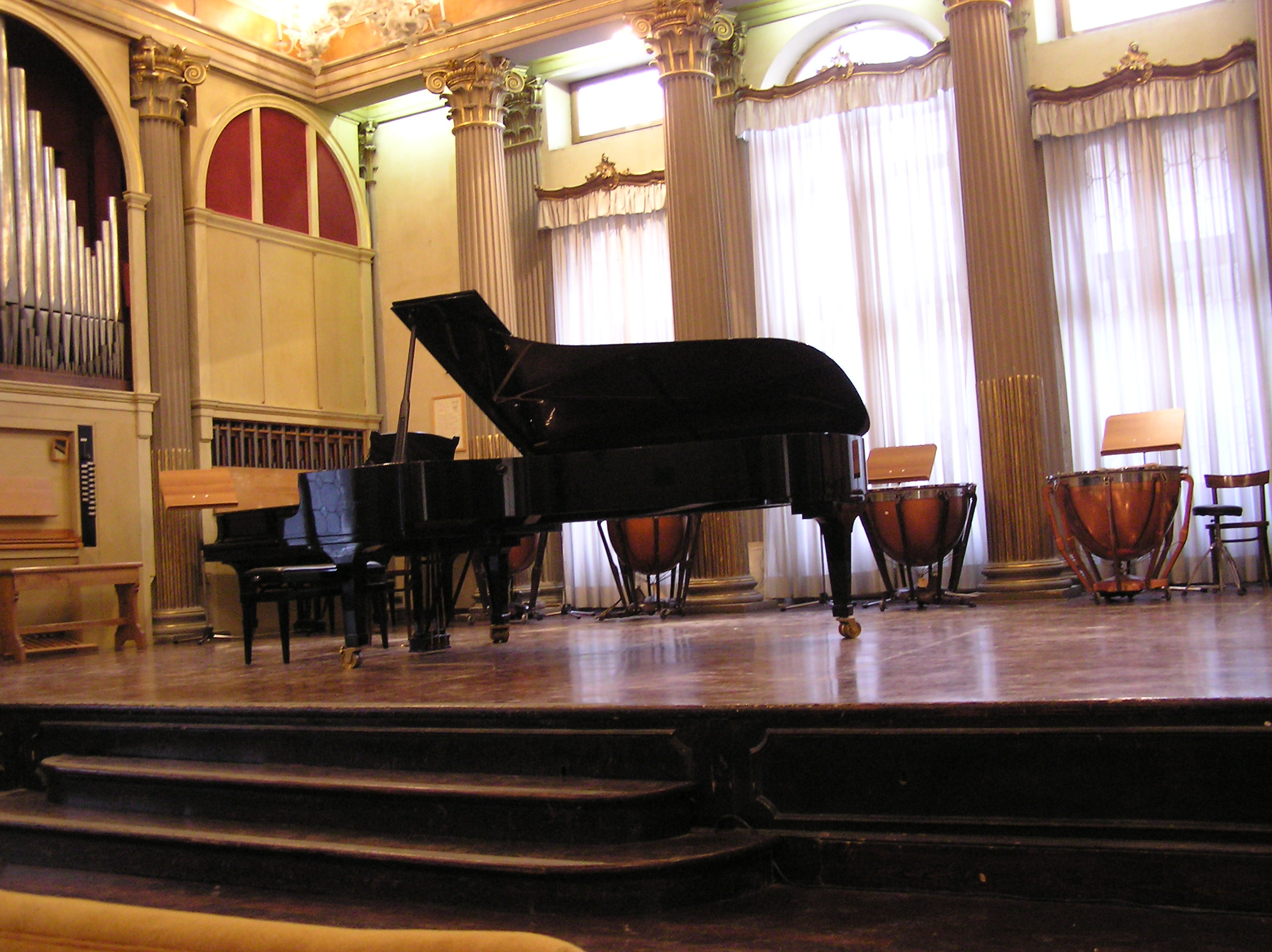
Salle de concert

The Conservatorio di Musica Benedetto Marcello di Venezia, also known as the Venice Conservatory, is a conservatory in Venice, Italy, named after composer Benedetto Marcello and established in 1876.

== History ==
The conservatory was established in 1876 as Liceo e Società Musicale Benedetto Marcello, became communal in 1895 under the name Liceo Civico Musicale "Benedetto Marcello", and attained conservatory status in 1915 as Liceo Civico Musicale Pareggiato Benedetto Marcello. In 1940, under the directorship of Gian Francesco Malipiero, it became Conservatorio di Stato "Benedetto Marcello". The conservatory is housed in Palazzo Pisani a San Stefano - built between 1614 and 1615 -, located facing Campo Santo Stefano in the sestiere of San Marco. The building is owned by the municipality of Venice.

== Courses ==
The conservatory offers courses in singing, solfège, music dictation, score reading, music composition, jazz music, electronic music, choral music, orchestration, and in playing guitar, harp, piano, violin, flute, lute, double bass, saxophone, trumpet, cello, percussion instruments, oboe, bassoon, clarinet and the venizian choir

organ.

The conservatory accepts foreign students, provided that they pass an entry test and have sufficient knowledge of the Italian language.

== Directors ==
- Marco Enrico Bossi
- Ermanno Wolf-Ferrari
- Gian Francesco Malipiero
- Gabriele Bianchi

== Faculty ==
- Gino Tagliapietra
- Francesco de Guarnieri
- Ettore Gracis
- Bruno Maderna
- Giuseppe Sinopoli

== Notable alumni ==
- Federico Agostini
- Claudio Ambrosini
- Raffaello de Banfield
- Elio Battaglia
- Gabriele Bianchi
- Mario Brunello
- Matilde Capuis
- Giuliano Carmignola
- Leo Catozzo
- Ernesto Rubin de Cervin
- Maria Chiara
- Nicolò Coccon
- Giampaolo Coral
- Toti Dal Monte
- Pino Donaggio
- Riccardo Drigo
- Pier Miranda Ferraro
- Gianni Ferrio
- Alberto Franchetti
- Massimiliano Frani
- Wladimiro Ganzarolli
- Ettore Gracis
- Antonio Guarnieri
- Geoffrey King
- Bice Lazzari
- Andrea Liberovici
- Adriano Lualdi
- Bruno Maderna
- Gian Francesco Malipiero
- Guido Marzorati
- Evangelina Mascardi
- Sara Mingardo
- Vazgen Muradian
- Luigi Nono
- Albert Patron
- Giorgio Polacco
- Patty Pravo
- Virgilio Ranzato
- Oreste Ravanello
- Lorenzo Regazzo
- Katia Ricciarelli
- Franco Rossi
- Nino Sanzogno
- Sebastian F. Schwarz
- Giuseppe Sinopoli
- Lucia Valentini Terrani
- Pier Adolfo Tirindelli
- Lamberto Tronchin
- Ermanno Wolf-Ferrari
- Mario Zafred
