= Gevorg Emin =

Gevorg Emin Գևորգ Էմին
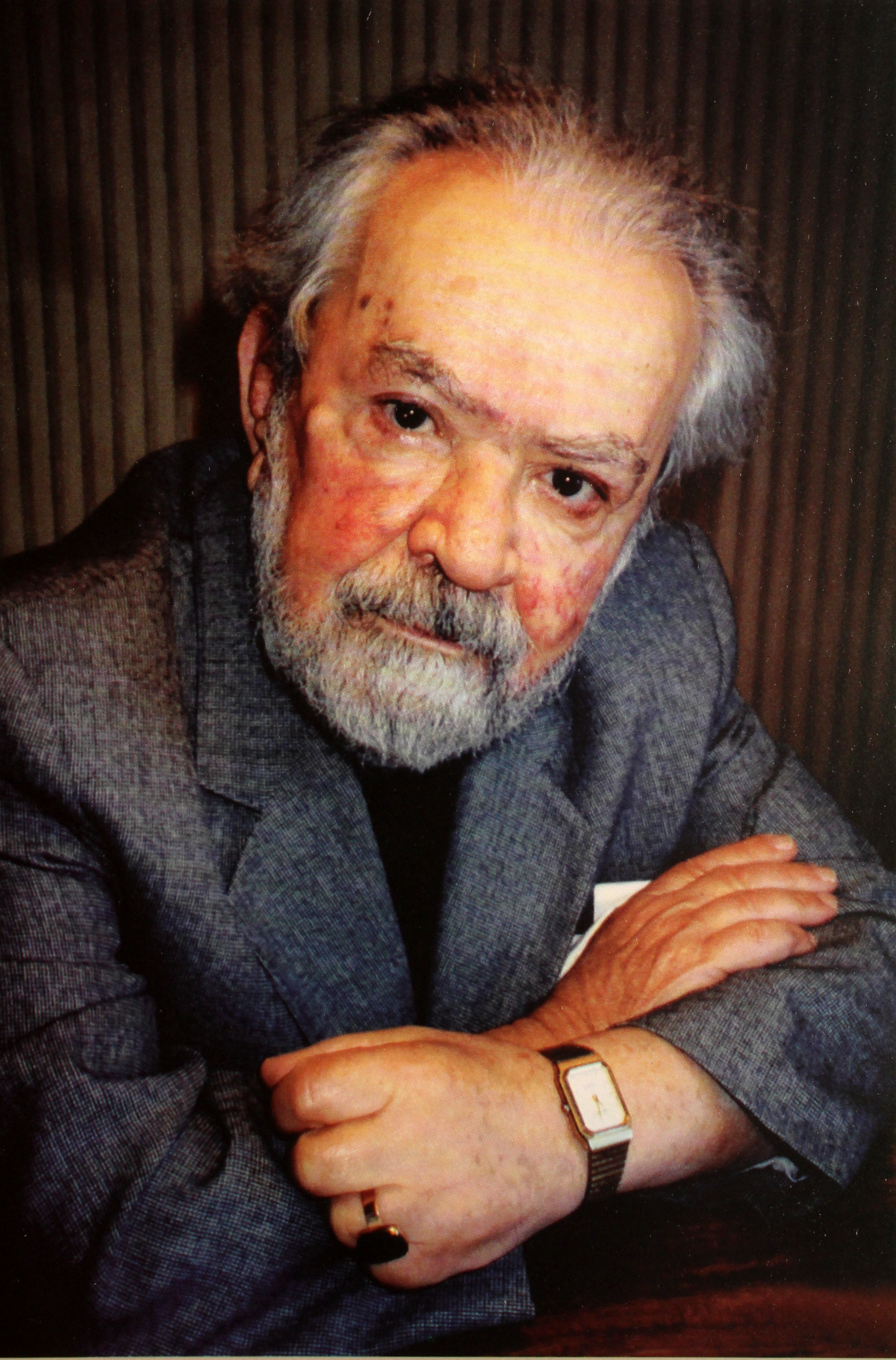
- Gevorg Emin
- Born: September 30, 1919; Ashtarak, First Republic of Armenia
- Died: July 11, 1998 (aged 78); Yerevan, Armenia
- Occupations: Poet; essayist; translator
- Relatives: Artashes Emin (son), Vazgen Muradian (brother), Vago Muradian (nephew)
- Writing career
- Notable work: Seven Songs About Armenia
- Literary movement: Socialist realism

Signature
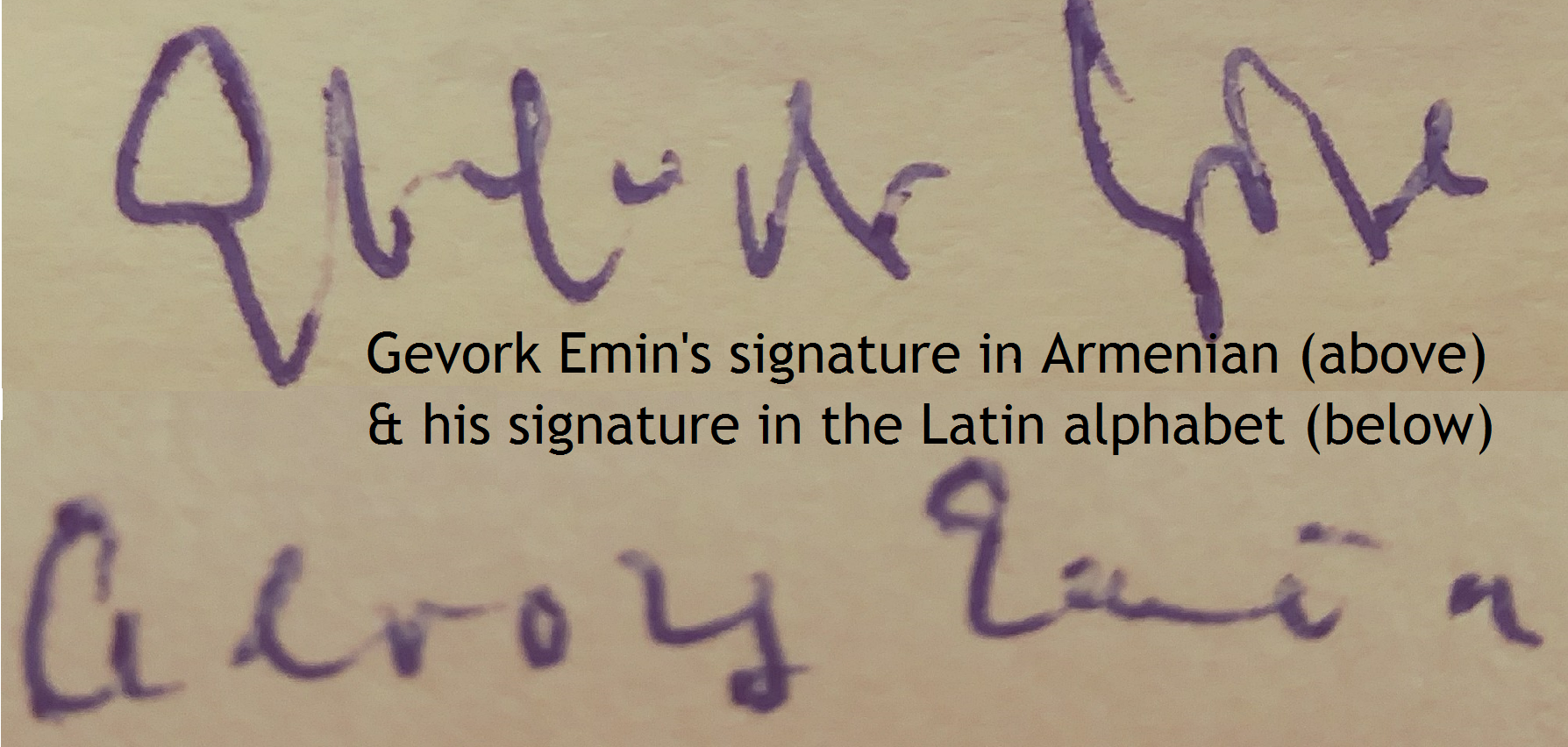

Gevorg Emin (Armenian: Գևորգ Էմին, born Karlen Muradyan; September 30, 1919 – July 11, 1998) was an Armenian poet, essayist, and translator.

== Biography ==
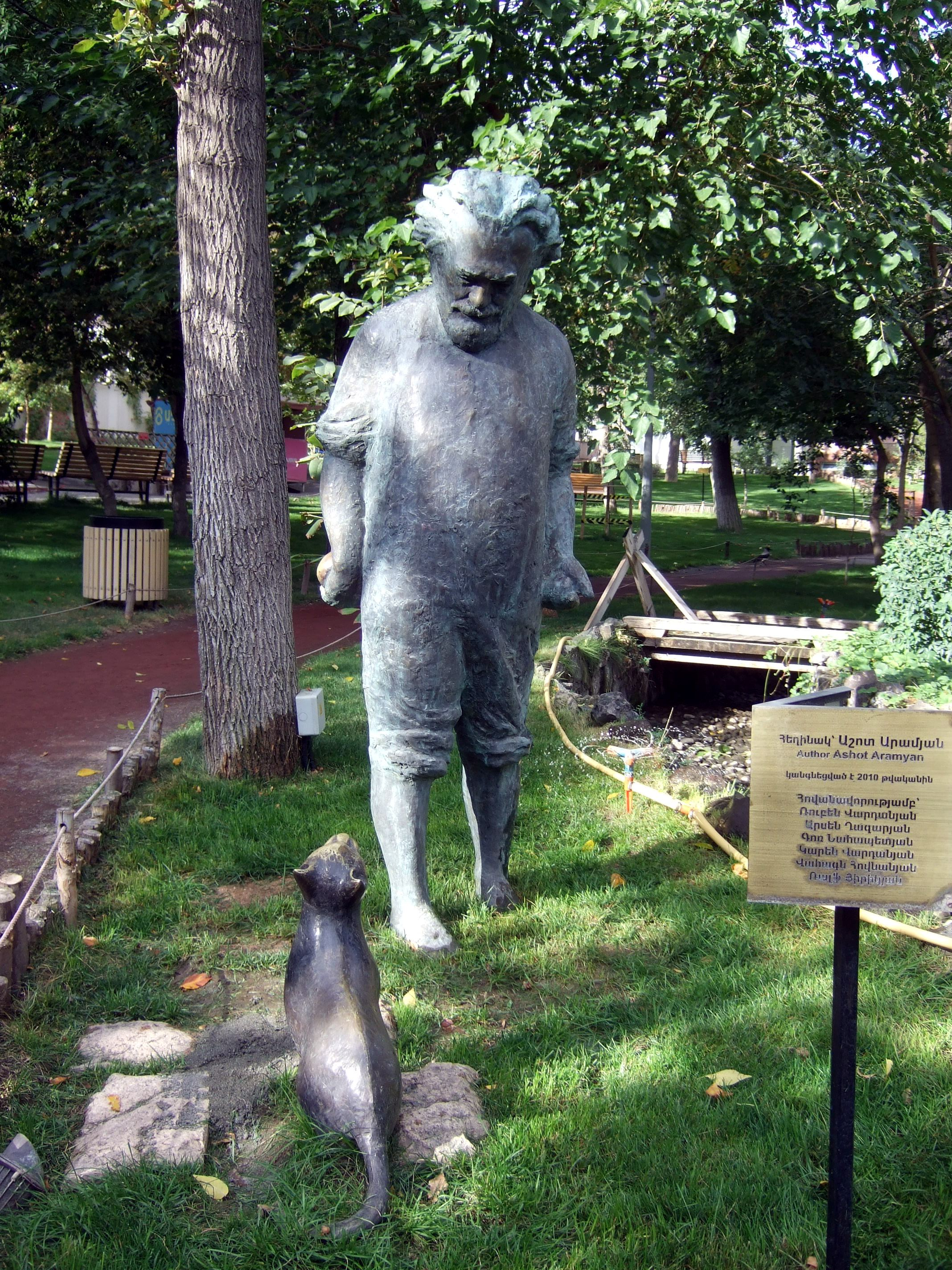
The statue of Gevorg Emin at the Yerevan Lovers' Park

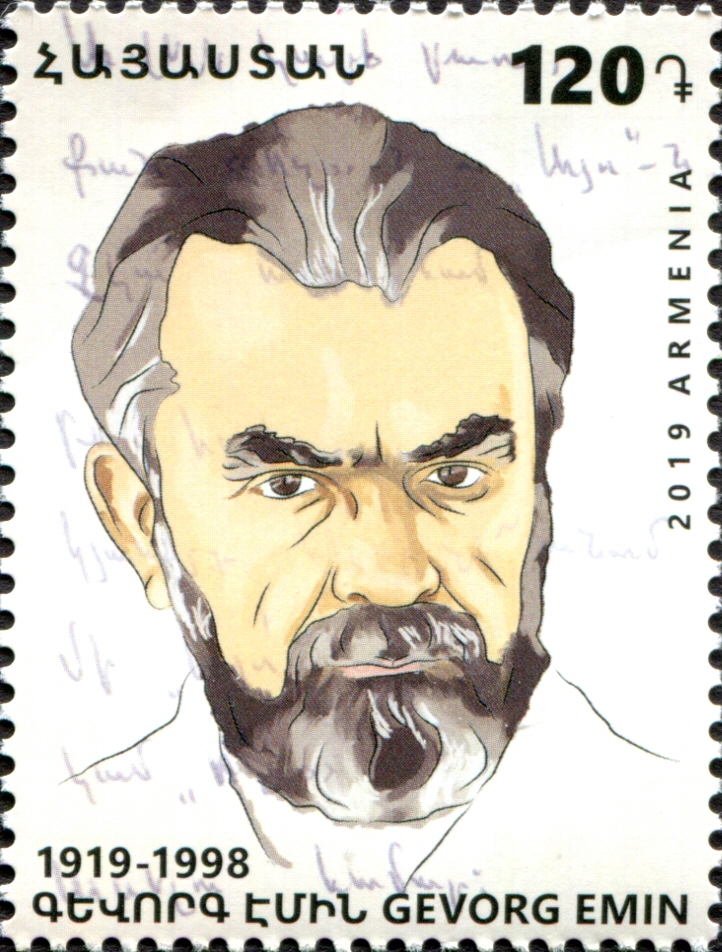
Emin on a 2019 stamp of Armenia

Emin, the son of a school teacher, was born in the town of Ashtarak. In 1927, his family moved to Yerevan, the capital of Soviet Armenia. In 1936 he finished secondary school; in 1940 he graduated from the local Polytechnical Institute as a hydraulic engineer. After graduation he designed and supervised the building of a hydroelectric power station which is still producing electricity. The power station remained his only engineering accomplishment.

In school, Emin met Armenia's leading poet Yegishe Charents, who died in 1937 in a Soviet prison. Emin recalls in his preface to For You on New Year's Day:

Today if I write instead of building canals and power plants it is due to two things: the impact of meeting Yeghishe Charents, and second, the touch of ancient manuscripts at the Matenadaran library where I worked as a student and could read and hold the magnificent old manuscripts from the fifth through the eighteenth centuries.

Emin's roots as a poet are deeply embedded in the culture and the physical landscape of the country he grew up in. To this is added his extensive reading of modern poetry, especially French symbolist poets, and his enduring faith in the power of poetry. From 1941 to 1945, Emin fought (and was wounded) in World War II. His poetry makes no specific references to his own war experiences but often refers to the Armenian genocide.

Emin's poetry has been translated from Armenian to many languages all over the world. Poet Yevgeny Yevtushenko read him in Russian and immediately hailed his work. Yevtushenko wrote the Introduction to the collection of Emin's verse translated into English as For You on New Year's Day; here the Russian poet contrasted Emin to his fellow Armenian poets who emphasized emotion in their work:

Gevorg Emin has an entirely opposite conception of the craft. He takes pride in revealing the rational armature of poetry and the details of its construction. Some of his poems remind us of transparent watches where the movements and direction of each gear and lever are visible. But it is a watch that keeps perfect time.

Perhaps as a result of Emin's training in science, he writes in a simple, straight forward language. Edmond Y. Azadian, in the Afterword to For You on New Year's Day, suggests that Emin freed Armenian poetry "from the restrictions that followed Charents' time, the bleak Stalin era," reinvigorating it after a long period during which experimentalism had been discouraged. Martin Robbins suggests, in Ararat Quarterly, that his poetry reflects "the tough compression of an engineer's mathematically trained mind," and cites as a representative example his poem "Small" in which he acknowledges the defenselessness of the Armenian people but affirms their strength. In many of his poems Mount Ararat itself serves as an emblem of the endurance of his people. In "Song of Songs" he writes: "I am an Armenian. ancient as this Biblical Ararat / my feet still wet from the waters of the flood."

For his poetry, Emin was awarded the Stalin Prize in 1951 and the USSR State Prize in 1976. In 1972, he toured the United States with Yevtushenko giving poetry readings. His American experience reflected in some of his later poems, published in Land, Love, Century, including Gravestone in a Negro Cemetery, First Night in New York, and In the Streets of Boston.

Emin's first wife was the daughter of the distinguished Armenian poet Vahan Terian. After her death, he married a writer, Armenouhi Hamparian. He had three sons. Emin was a translator of note in Eastern Europe: he is especially admired for his translations of Polish poets ranging from Adam Mickiewicz to the contemporary poet Tadeusz Różewicz. In Poland's long struggle for independence and national identity, he identified some of his own feelings about Armenia and he has hailed "the proud spirit of the Polish people, their fanatical attachment to their land, language, literature, tradition." His brother was the Armenian-American composer Vazgen Muradian.
