= Matilde Capuis =

Italian composer

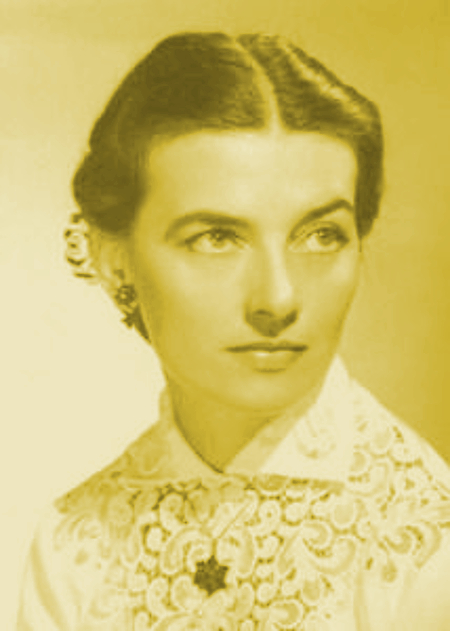
Matilde Capuis

Matilde Margherita Mary Capuis (1 January 1913 – 31 January 2017) was an Italian organist, pianist, music educator and composer. She was born in Naples and studied at the Conservatorio di Musica Benedetto Marcello di Venezia with Gabriele Bianchi and at the Florence Conservatory.

After completing her studies, she took a position at the Conservatorio Giuseppe Verdi of Turin where she became chair of theory and then composition. For many years she performed in a duo with cellist Hugh Attilio Scabia.

Capuis died in 2017 at the age of 104.

== Works ==
Capuis' compositions include:

- Symphony in G major
- Concentus brevis (Concerto) for oboe and string orchestra (1975)
- Overture for orchestra
- Variations for orchestra
- Corale for organ, string orchestra and two horns
- Dialogue for string orchestra
- Leggenda par la Notte di Natale for string orchestra
- Three Moments for cello and string orchestra
- Fantasia
- Preludio e fughetta
- Suite in Miniature for piano trio
- Sonata No. 1 in C Minor for cello and piano
- Sonata No. 2 in D Minor for cello and piano
- Sonata No. 3 in F-sharp Minor for cello and piano (1966)
- Sonata No. 4 in G major for cello and piano (1975)
- Sonata No. 5 for cello and piano (1980)
- Elegy for cello and piano
- Theme and Variations for cello and piano
- Sonata in Mi Minore for piano
- Dodici Liriche
- Il pianto della Madonna for soli, choir and orchestra

Her works have been recorded and issued on CD, including:

- Matilde Capuis: Works for Cello and Piano Vol. 1 (Duo Capuis) (6 Aug 2007) Audite, ASIN: B000027BGJ
- Debut: Lieder von Komponistinnen [Lieder by Women Composers, Performed by Women Students] (September 24, 2002) Cavalli, ASIN: B00006IZN7
