= Sylvie Mamy =

French writer and musicologist

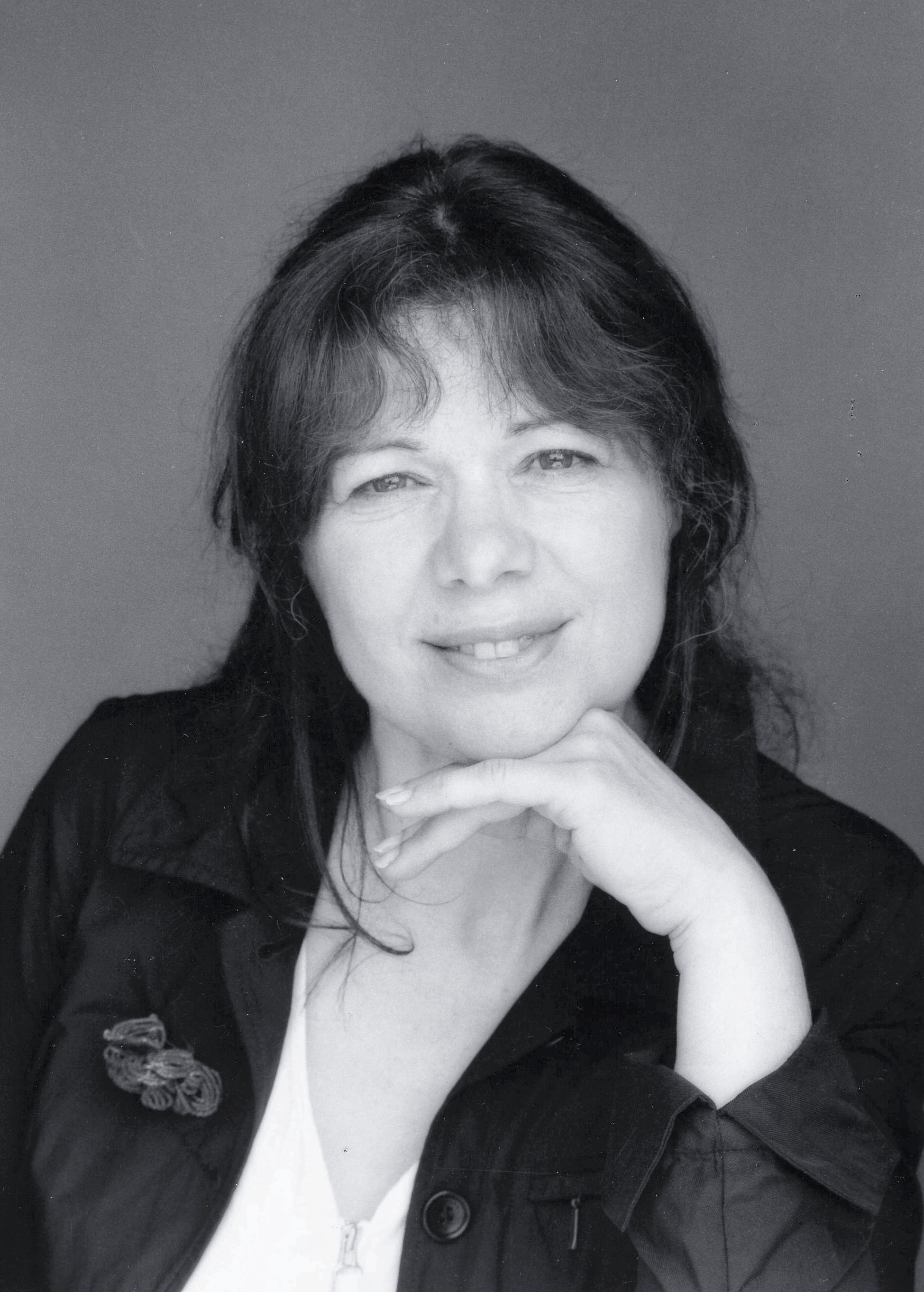
Sylvie Mamy

Sylvie Mamy, born in Besançon, is a French writer and musicologist, Docteur d'État ès lettres, and research director at the CNRS.

== Distinctions ==
- Prix des Muses 1997 (for "La Musique à Venise", Paris, BnF, 1996).
- Grand Prix des Muses 2012 (for "Antonio Vivaldi", Paris, Fayard, 2011).

== Bibliography ==
=== Monographs ans essays ===
- Reconnaissance des Musiques Modernes, Brussels, Radio Télévision Belge Francophone (RTBF), 1977.
- Il Teatro alla Moda dei rosignoli. I cantanti napoletani al San Giovanni Grisostomo (Merope, 1734), series "Drammaturgia veneta", Milan, Ricordi, 1984.
- Les grands castrats napolitains à Venise au XVIIIe', Liège, Mardaga, 1994. ISBN 2-87009-507-4
- La musique à Venise et l'imaginaire français des Lumières, d'après les sources vénitiennes conservées à la Bibliothèque nationale de France, Paris, Bibliothèque Nationale de France, 1996. This work was awarded the Prix des Muses in 1997 "for the best musicological study". ISBN 2-7177-1969-5 BnF 36157252w
- Les castrats, Que sais-je? n° 3417, Paris, PUF, 1998. ISBN 978-2-13-049503-1
- Antonio Schinella Conti, Lettere da Venezia a Madame la comtesse de Caylus 1727–1729, Con l'aggiunta di un Discorso sullo Stato della Francia, series Linea Veneta, n° 17 (Venice, Fondation G. Cini), Florence, L. S. Oslchki, 2003. ISBN 88-222-5192-X
- Balades musicales dans Venise, Paris, Nouveau Monde, 2006.ISBN 2-84736-182-0
- Passeggiate musicali a Venezia, translation of the previous work in Italian, 2006, Trévise, Vianello Libri
- Antonio Vivaldi (monograph), Paris, A. Fayard, June 2011. This work was awarded the Grand Prix des Muses in 2012. ISBN 978-2-213-63761-7 BnF 42458207c
- Claudio Ambrosini, un compositeur vénitien du XXIème siècle, Paris, L'Harmattan, July 2013. ISBN 978-2-343-01354-1
- "Chaliapine", Paris, YMCA-Press, 2023. ISBN 978-2-850-6530-25

=== Literary works ===
- L'Allée de Mélisande. Les jardins et la musique, essai poétique, series "Arts et Sciences de l'Art", Paris, L'Harmattan, 2004. ISBN 2-7475-7580-2
- Lettre d'une virtuose vénitienne, texte poétique, Venice, Rapport d'Etape, 2005.
- Veronica Franco. Ma vie brisée de courtisane, novel, series Amarante, Paris, L'Harmattan, 2012. ISBN 978-2-336-00312-2
- Paris, Carnet d'été (poetry), Paris, L'Harmattan, 2014. ISBN 978-2-343-03791-2

=== Translations ===
1992: Encyclopédie de la musique, series Encyclopédies d'aujourd'hui, Paris, Le Livre de Poche, Hachette, (original : La nuova enciclopedia della musica, Garzanti, 1983).

2014: Un jardin à Venise, translation by Frederic Eden, A garden in Venice (1903), Paris, L'Harmattan

=== Articles and studies ===
- Trois thèmes pour servir à une réflexion sur la vie musicale d'aujourd'hui, Brussels, Union européenne, Division X "Problèmes du Secteur Culturel", July 1975, 91 p.
- Pour un théâtre européen de musique vivante, Bulletin mensuel d'information du Comité national de la musique, June 1975.
- "Le Triomphe des Mélophilètes. Congiunzioni di Parnaso", L'invenzione del Gusto, Corelli e Vivaldi, Milan, Ricordi, 1982, p. 93–101.
- "L'œuvre de Giuseppe Sarti conservée à Paris", Revue Française de Musicologie, 1987, t. 73, n° 1, p. 107–12.
- "À propos d'un fonds de musique française des XVIIe and XVIIIe à la Bibliothèque municipale de Besançon", Revue Française de Musicologie, 1987, t. 73, n° 2, p. 253–62.
- "I rapporti fra opera e ballo a Venezia nel Settecento", La danza italiana, 5/6, Rome, Theoria, 1987, p. 17–33.
- "L'Italie au cœur" (about Giulio Cesare by Haendel), Avant-Scène Opéra, Paris, April 1987, p. 86–91; reissued in December 2010.
- "L'importation des solfèges italiens en France à la fin du XVIIIe", L'opera tra Venezia e Parigi", under the direction of M.T. Muraro, Florence, L.S. Olschki, 1988, p. 67–89.
- "Une théorie italienne adaptée au goût français. L'enseignement du chant italien en France de la fin de l'Ancien Régime à la Restauration : transmission ou transformation ?", Transmission et réception des formes de culture musicale, Turin, EDT, 1988, p. 198–213.
- "Tradizione del canto a Napoli. Giuseppe Aprile", Musicisti nati in Puglia ed emigrazione musicale tra Seicento e Settecento, under the direction of D. Bozzi and L. Cosi, Rome, Torre d'Orfeo, 1988, p. 281–98.
- "Il mondo del teatro," Amadeus, Milan, Rizzoli periodici, De Agostini, October 1991, addendum to n° 23 devoted to Vivaldi, p. 42–48.
- "Le printemps d'Antonio Vivaldi revu et corrigé à Paris par Nicolas Chédeville, Michel Corrette et Jean-Jacques Rousseau", Informazioni e Studi vivaldiani, Milan, Ricordi, 1992 (13), p. 51–65.
- Articles "Anfossi, Caccini, Cavalli, Bianchi, Italie, Le chant italien en France", Dictionnaire de la musique française au XVIIIe, sous la direction de M. Benoit, Paris, Fayard, 1992.
- Articles "Gazzaniga, Porpora", extraits de Encyclopedia Universalis, Dictionnaire de la Musique. Les compositeurs, Paris, Albin Michel, 1998, p. 304–06, 618–19.
- "Le Congrès des Planètes, une sérénade de Tomaso Albinoni exécutée à l'ambassade de France à Venise, le 16 octobre 1729", Giovanbattista Tiepolo, Nel terzo Centenario della nascita, under the direction of L. Puppi, Quaderni Venezia Arti, Venise, Il Poligrafo, 1998, p. 205–12.
- "Le Stabat Mater au Concert Spirituel", Studi Pergolesiani -Pergolesi Studies, under the direction of F. Degrada, La Nuova Italia Editrice, 1999, p. 233–50.
- "Les Fêtes Vénitiennes", Teatro nel Veneto. La scena immaginata, under the direction of C. Alberti (University of Venise), Milan, F. Motta, 2002, p. 38–63.
- "Drammaturgie dello spazio nei multimedia : teatro musicale, circo, opera, internet, CD-Roms e installazioni video", Drammaturgia, under the direction of S. Ferrone, University of Florence, département des arts du spectacle, issue devoted to the "Drammaturgie dello spazio. Teatro. Musica. Cinema" directed by S. Mazzoni, Rome, Salerno Editrice, 2003, p. 449–66.
- Articles "Castrats; Cimarosa; Dramma semi-serio; Paer, Paisiello, Spontini, Tragédie lyrique", Dictionnaire de la musique en France au XIXe, under the direction of J.-M. Fauquet, Paris, Fayard, 2003.
- "L'invention de l'opéra ballet à sujet comique", Un siècle de Deux cents ans ? Les XVII et XVIII siècles : Continuités et Discontinuités, under the direction of J. Dagen et Ph. Roger, series "L'Esprit des lettres", Paris, Desjonquères, 2004, p. 231–247.
- "Il panorama operistico. Il Mondo novo", Amadeus. Il mensile della grande musica, special issue devoted to the opéra Tito Manlio by Antonio Vivaldi, Milan, De Agostini-Rizzoli periodici, April 2004, p. 6–10.
- "Charles-Ferdinand Ramus. Poeta visionario", Amadeus, L'Histoire du Soldat d'Igor Stravinsky, Milan, De Agostini-Rizzoli periodici, December 2005, p. 16–17.
- "Les Français à Venise. Des témoignages controversés", Le Carnaval de Venise d'André Campra, series "Regards sur la musique", under the direction of J. Duron, Brussels-Wavre, Mardaga, 2010, p. 13–28.
- "Antonio Vivaldi aux prises avec des danseurs indisciplinés", Passi, tracce, percorsi. Scritti sulla danza italiana in omaggio a José Sasportes (dir. A. Pontremoli, P. Veroli), Rome, Aracne, 2012, p. 113–28.
- "Venise, Opéra !", in D. Gachet and A. Scarsella, Venise, coll. "Bouquins", Paris, Éditions Robert Laffont, 2016, p. 428–40.
