= Ettore Gracis =

Italian conductor (1915–1992)

- Ettore Gracis (photo with 1955 dedication)
- Occupation: conductor

Ettore Gracis (24 September 1915 – 12 April 1992) was an Italian conductor. Born in La Spezia, he studied at the Venice Conservatory and the Accademia Musicale Chigiana. He became involved with the Venice Festival of Contemporary Music and the Naples Festival, conducting modern revivals of classical Italian and German operas (including Mozart and Rossini). He spent much of his career at opera houses throughout Italy, including La Fenice, whose orchestra he led for twelve years.

== Sources ==
- Grove Music Online biography
