= Andrea Liberovici =

Italian composer (born 1962)

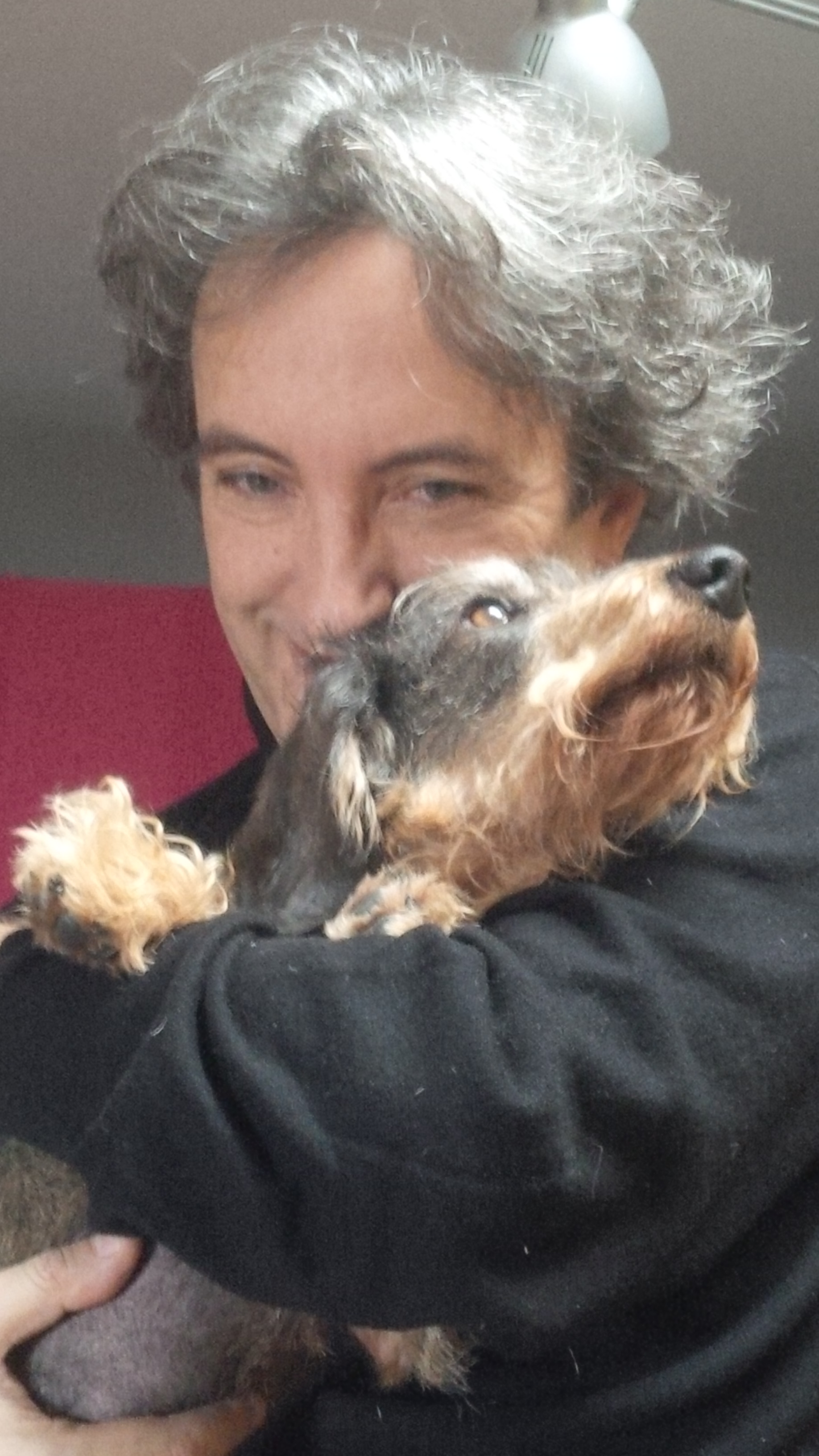
- Liberovici with his dog
- Born: 1962 (age 63–64); Turin, Italy
- Occupations: Composer, theatre director
- Parent(s): Sergio Liberovici, Margot Galante Garrone
- Website: liberovici.it

Andrea Liberovici (born 1962) is an Italian composer of contemporary classical music and a theatre director.

== Biography ==
Andrea Liberovici was born in Turin, the son of Sergio Liberovici (musician, Turin, 1930–1991) and Margot Galante Garrone. He studied composition, violin and viola at the conservatories of Venice and Turin. He also studied acting at the Scuola del Teatro Stabile in Genoa, and singing with Cathy Berberian at the International Festival in Montalcino in 1980. He recorded his first LP at the age of fifteen.

As a composer and director, he co-founded Teatrodelsuono (theatre of sound) with poet Edoardo Sanguineti (librettist of Luciano Berio) and Ottavia Fusco.

Jean-Jacques Nattiez wrote, "Andrea Liberovici is a composer of his time. He define himself a modern. ... We can find in his Frankenstein Cabaret a metaphor of the composer today. ... he his a tragic musician, a tragic-postmodern composer who tell about man and woman compared with the absurd and unbearable loneliness in which Internet borders more and more humanity."

Over the last decade, in collaboration with artists such as Peter Greenaway, Claudia Cardinale, Aldo Nove, Judith Malina, Vittorio Gassman, Giorgio Albertazzi, Enrico Ghezzi, Ivry Gitlis and Regina Carter, Liberovici has created many projects concerning the relationships between music, poetry, theatre, and technology.

Recently, those who have performed his music include Yuri Bashmet, Nouvel Ensemble Moderne (Montreal), Toscanini Orchestra, and Teatro Carlo Felice. His works have also been presented and produced by the Teatro di Roma (Rome), La Fenice (Venice), and Salle Olivier Messiaen (Paris). He has also worked in residence at INA-GRM (the Music Research Group of the Institut national de l'audiovisuel) and France Culture in Paris, STEIM (Studio for Electro-Instrumental Music) Center for Research and Development in Amsterdam, and the Groupe de Musique Expérimentale de Marseille (GMEM) National Centre of Musical Creation in Marseille. His music and performances have been presented in Italy, New York, Paris, Athens, and Montreal.

== Musical compositions ==
- 64, Oratorio for actors in 64 movements through the acoustic memory of Living Theatre from J. Cage to now, with Judith Malina, Hanon Reznikov, Ottavia Fusco, GRM – INA, Paris, 2000
- Frankenstein Cabaret, Festival Les Musiques, GMEM, Marseille, 2001
- Electronic Lied, GRM – INA, Paris, 2002
- Electronic Frankenstein, Teatro Carlo Felice, Genoa, 2002
- Intégral, Radio France-France Culture, Paris, 2003
- Children of Uranium, concept and libretto Peter Greenaway, direction Saskia Boddeke, Genoa, 2005
- Cunegonde's last journey to Irak, Festival Archipel, Geneva, 2005
- Poètanz!, libretto Edoardo Sanguineti, Festival Oriente Occidente, Artemis Danza, Rovereto, 2006
- Titania la Rossa, libretto and direction Giorgio Albertazzi, Fondazione A. Toscanini, Piacenza, 2007
- From Ivry, dedicated to Ivry Gitlis, with Nouvel Ensemble Moderne, Montreal, 2007
- The Transparency of the Word – cantata for Primo Levi, libretto Emilio Jona music and video Andrea Liberovici, with Nouvel Ensemble Moderne, International Symposium "New Voices on Primo Levi", Asia Society, New York, 26 October 2010
- Springing from the Heart, libretto Daisaku Ikeda, Festival Les Musiques, GMEM, Marseille, 2010
- Non un Silenzio, for viola, string orchestra and celesta, commissioned from Yuri Bashmet and Moscow Soloists, Teatro La Fenice, Venice, 2014
- MAVRYA, dedicated to Martha Argerich and Ivry Gitlis, for violin and piano, Lugano Festival – Martha Argerich Project, Lugano, 2015
- Resonant Cities. Venezia: madrigale per violoncello e città, produzione GRM-INA, Paris 2016
- Dialogo successivo, studio/tribute through a “successive dialogue“ of acoustic material by Luigi Nono – for electronics and cello, with Francesco Dillon, cello – Festival Nono, Venice 2018
- Some Things, songbook – with Helga Davis and Vana Gierig, piano – Joe's Pub, New York 2019
- Acoustic Postcards Venice, – 2020
- Venice Water Postcards, for string quartet and electroacoustics, with Quartetto Prometeo – Heidelberg Frühling Festival 2022
- Sounds of Venice Number Two, by Andrea Liberovici and Paolo Zavagna, Venice Biennale 2023

== Dramas ==
- Rap, text by Edoardo Sanguineti, music and direction Andrea Liberovici, Teatro di Sant'Agostino, Genoa, 1996
- Sonetto, text by Edoardo Sanguineti, music and direction Andrea Liberovici Teatro Carlo Felice, Genoa, 1997
- Macbeth Remix, from W. Shakespeare, text by Edoardo Sanguineti, music and direction Andrea Liberovici Spoleto Festival, Spoleto, 1998
- Seipersonaggi.com, da L. Pirandello, text by Edoardo Sanguineti, music and direction Andrea Liberovici Teatro Stabile, Genoa, 2001
- Concerto per Roma, with Giorgio Albertazzi, Uto Ughi, Teatro Argentina, Rome, 2002
- Quaderni di Serafino Gubbio operatore, by Luigi Pirandello, Teatro Stabile, Rome, 2002
- Candido. Soap opera musical, text by Aldo Nove and Andrea Liberovici, Teatro Stabile, Genoa, 2004
- Centurie, by Manganelli, Calvino, Trilussa, with Massimo Popolizio, XXXVIII Festival di Borgio Verezzi, Borgio Verezzi, 2004
- Urfaust, by J. W. von Goethe, with Ugo Pagliai and Paola Gassman, XXXIX Festival di Borgio Verezzi, Teatro Stabile, Genoa, Teatro Stabile del Veneto, Borgio Verezzi, 2005
- The Glass Menagerie, by Tennessee Williams with Claudia Cardinale, Fox&Gould, Rome, 2006
- Operetta in Nero music, text, video and direction Andrea Liberovici, with Helga Davis, Teatro Stabile, Genoa, 2011
- Fiona text by Mauro Covacich, music and direction Andrea Liberovici, Teatro Stabile, Trieste, 2012
- Macbeth Remix, from William Shakespeare by Edoardo Sanguineti, music and direction Andrea Liberovici, Teatro Stabile, Genoa, (2016) – new version
- Faust's Box. A transdisciplinary journey, music, text, video and direction by Andrea Liberovici, with Helga Davis, conductor Philippe Nahon and Ars Nova Ensemble (2016)
- Trilogy in Two. Opera mosaico, music, text, video and direction by Andrea Liberovici, with Helga Davis, Schallfeld Ensemble, conductor Sara Caneva (2019)
- Pop Detox, opera (work in progress) video Gianluca Abbate – Italian Academy, New York 2023

== Cinema ==
- 2008 – Postcards from Faust, 9 to 6 minutes in illusions
- 2006 – Work in Regress, an assembly
- 2004 – 500.000 Lions, The Last Hours of J.W. or Tarzan or J.W.
- 2003 – Il teatro immateriale, Rai Sat show

== Books ==
- Veneziacustica, Libro dei suoni no. 1, Squilibri, 2023, ISBN 8885571700
- Officina Liberovici, Marsilio, 2006, ISBN 9788831791120 (catalog)
- Candido. Soap opera musical, Il Melangolo, 2004, ISBN 978-88-7018-530-0 (libretto of the play)
- l mio amore è come una febbre e mi rovescio, Andrea Liberovici and Edoardo Sanguineti Bompiani, 1998, ISBN 8845236005

== Discography ==
- 1978 – ORO (CGD, LP)
- 1980 – Liberovici (CGD, 20194, LP, CD)
- 1992 – Pranzo di famiglia (Carosello, CD)
- 1996 – Rap (Fonit Cetra, CD)
- 1998 – Sonetto (Devega Edizioni)
- 2001 – 64 (GRM-INA, France)
- 2003 – Electronic Frankenstein (GMEM, France)
