= Pier Adolfo Tirindelli =

Italian violinist and composer

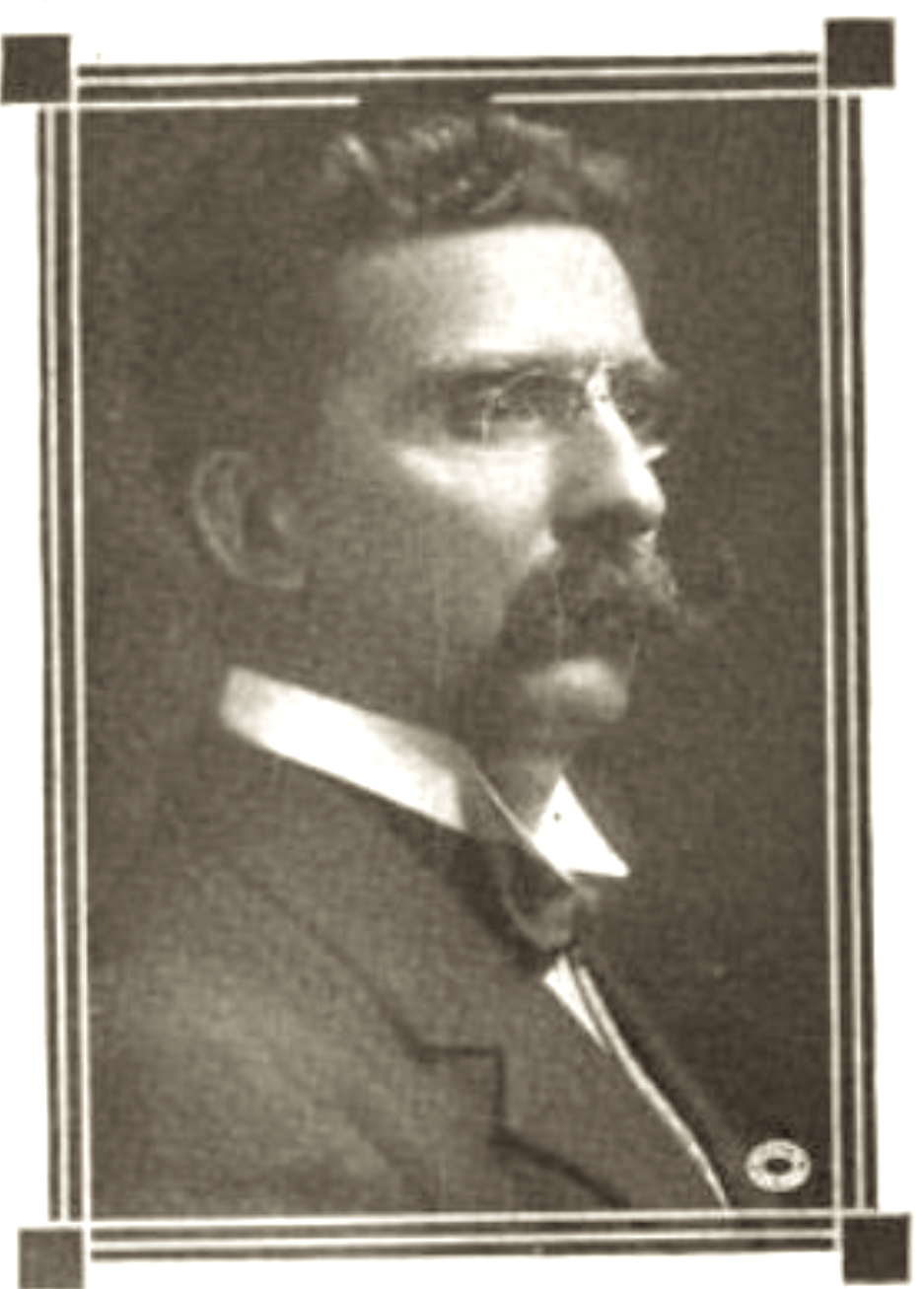
Pier Adolfo Tirindelli in 1916.

Pier Adolfo Tirindelli (5 May 1858, Conegliano Veneto–6 February 1937, Rome) was an Italian violinist and composer of operas and songs. He was a classmate and friend of Puccini. In 1883 he became professor of violin at the Venice Conservatory, of which he was director from 1893 to 1895. Later he settled in the United States, where was orchestra director and violin teacher at the Cincinnati Conservatory.

His most famous composition is the song "O primavera," dedicated to Enrico Caruso. It was sung by many great singers, in particular Carlo Bergonzi, who recorded it and performed it often.

== Selected works ==
Romanze:

- "Amore, amor!"
- "Mistica"
- "Myosotis"
- "Primavera"
