= Vazgen Muradian =

Armenian-American composer

Vazgen Muradian (October 17, 1921 - February 18, 2018) was an Armenian-American neo-classicist composer known for having written concerti for every instrument in the orchestra. Among the instruments he is most noted for having created works for are the clarinet, the tuba, the bassoon ("The Big Bassoon") and the Viola d'amore.

== Biography ==
Born in Ashtarak, Armenia, Muradian was drafted into the Soviet Army during World War II and saw action against Nazi Germany on the Eastern Front. Following the Soviet collapse against the invading German army, he became a refugee from both Nazis and the Soviets and performed with the Stanislav Symphony Orchestra, the Lvov Opera, and on the vaudeville stage in Warsaw. His travels during this period also brought him to Berlin and Vienna and finally to Venice, where he settled to study. In Venice, he enrolled at the Conservatorio di Musica Benedetto Marcello di Venezia and studied composition with Gabriele Bianchi, violin with Luigi Ferro, and Viola d’amore with Renzo Sabatini.

1948 saw Muradian graduate from the conservatory with a degree as a professor of music. Still in Venice, he took a position teaching at the Moorat Raphael College. In 1950 he left Italy for to the United States, where he resided until his death in 2018 and where he wrote all of his major musical compositions. Henceforth he played violin in several musical ensembles including the New Orleans Symphony Orchestra. He then removed himself as an orchestra member to focus solely upon composition. His works have been performed by the Armenian Philharmonic Orchestra, the Chicago Chamber Orchestra, the Little Orchestra Society of New York, the New Jersey Association of Verrisimo opera, and the Viola d’amore Society of America, among others.

Muradian is known for having composed for every instrument in the classical orchestra as well as others not included in it. As of his seventieth birthday in 1991 he had composed 62 concerti for 35 different instruments. The Guide to the Tuba repertoire, published by Indiana University Press and edited by R. Winston Morris refers to his "Concerto for Tuba and Orchestra, Opus 85" as ...."A melodic neo-romantic work which takes the soloist through much of their range in a mostly diatonic fashion. The music contains passion reminiscent of the composer's homeland"...

Vazgen Muradian resided in New York City until his death in February 2018. He was predeceased by his wife Arpi. Together they have two sons, Armen Morian and Vardges "Vago" Muradian and two grandchildren. His brother was the Armenian poet Gevorg Emin.
