= Geoffrey King (composer) =

British composer and teacher (born 1949)

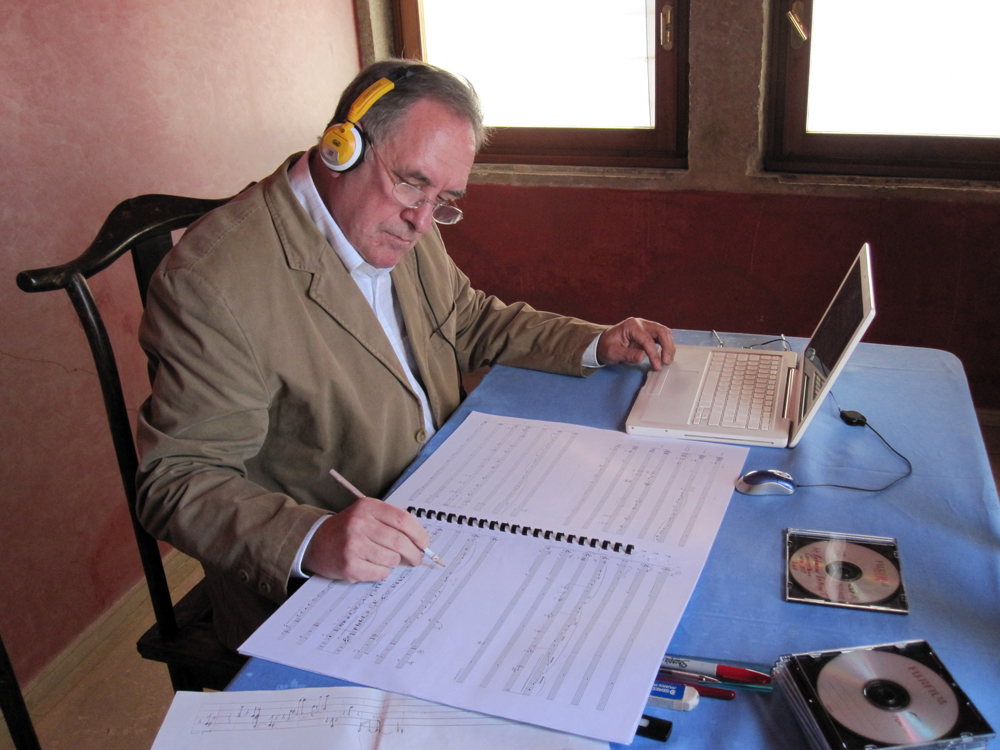
Composing in Venice. Photo by Roderik de Man.

Geoffrey King (born 1949) is a British composer and teacher.

== Biography ==
Born in Croydon, England, King's first musical studies were at the Royal School of Church Music at Addington Palace. Later, at the Royal College of Music, he studied with Humphrey Searle, Justin Connolly and Alexander Goehr. As a postgraduate, he undertook further work with Alexander Goehr at University of Southampton and also with Jonathan Harvey. With an Italian government scholarship, he went to study with Ernesto Rubin de Cervin at the Conservatorio "Benedetto Marcello" in Venice.

In 1976, King moved to Edinburgh to work at St Mary's Music School and during this time, together with Peter Nelson, he formed ECAT, the Scottish promoter of new music concerts. After twelve years in Edinburgh, he moved to The Hague to do further study at the Koninklijk Conservatorium and subsequently settled in Amsterdam, where he now lives. From 1987-89 he was composer-in-residence at Huddersfield Polytechnic and then at the NCOS (National Centre for Orchestral Studies) in London.

== Works ==
Geoffrey King has written about 100 works. His orchestral music includes several symphonies and concertante pieces. He has also written much instrumental/chamber music and some vocal and theatre music. He has been commissioned and performed by some of the main ensembles and new music promoters, including Aldeburgh Festival, Almeida Festival, Arditti Quartet, BBC Scottish Symphony Orchestra, ECAT, Edinburgh International Festival, London Sinfonietta, Lontano, Musica Nova, Nash Ensemble, Piano Circus, Schönberg Ensemble, Scottish Chamber Orchestra, Slagwerkgroep Den Haag and St. Magnus Festival.
