= Giuseppe Sinopoli =

Italian musician (1946–2001)

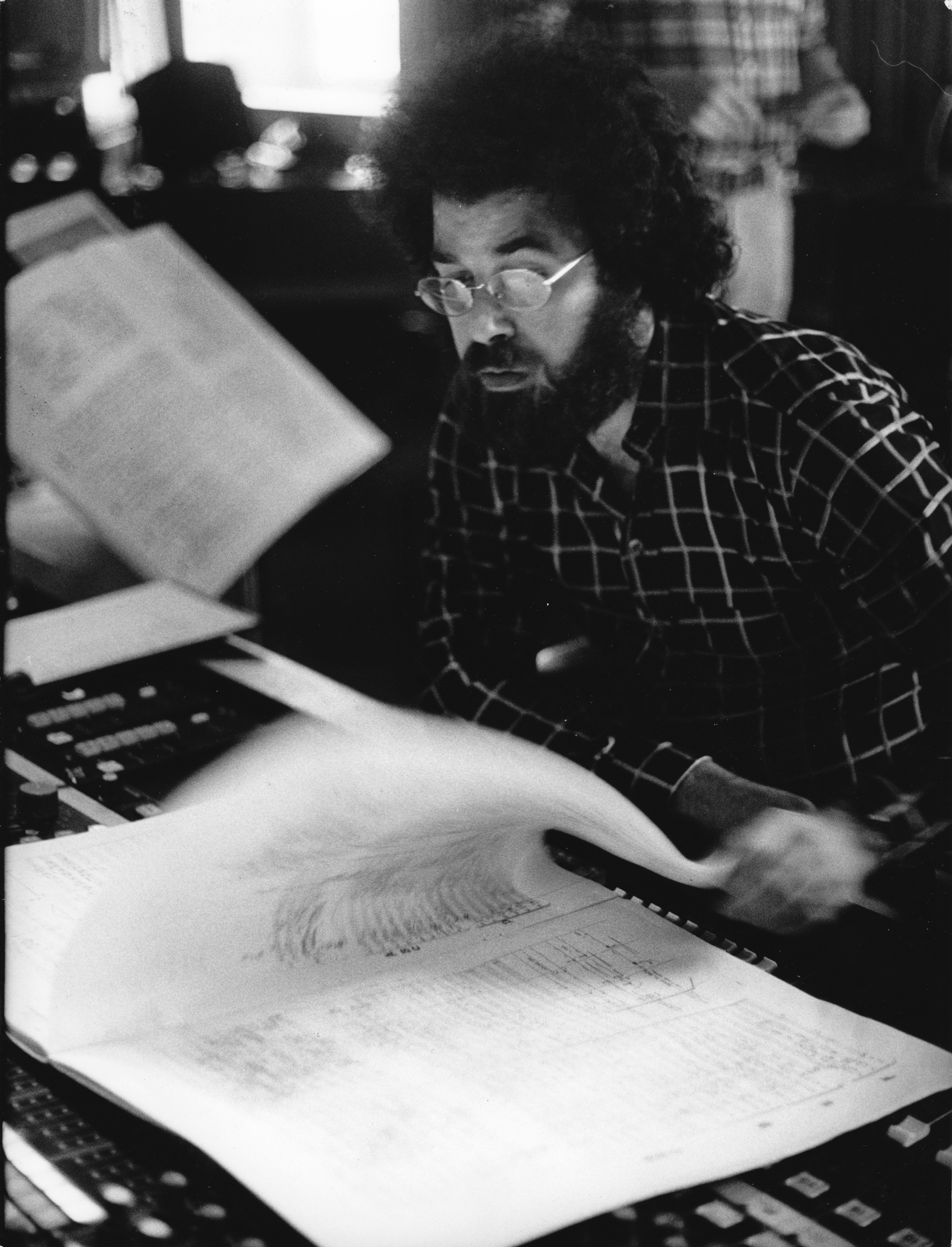
Giuseppe Sinopoli

Giuseppe Sinopoli (Italian pronunciation: [dʒuˈzɛppe siˈnɔːpoli]; 2 November 1946 – 20 April 2001) was an Italian conductor and composer.

== Biography ==
Sinopoli was born in Venice, Italy, and later studied at the Benedetto Marcello Conservatory in Venice under Ernesto Rubin de Cervin and at Darmstadt, including being mentored in composition with Karlheinz Stockhausen. He also obtained a doctorate in medicine, with an emphasis on psychiatry, from the University of Padua, and completed a dissertation on criminal anthropology. He posthumously obtained a degree in Archeology, his thesis defense being previously arranged for the day that ended up being the day of his funeral.

== Career ==
Sinopoli began to make a name for himself as a composer of serial works, becoming professor of contemporary and electronic music at the Venice Conservatoire Benedetto Marcello in 1972, and a major proponent of the new movement in Venice for contemporary music. He studied conducting at the Vienna Academy of Music under Hans Swarowsky; and in Venice, founded the Bruno Maderna Ensemble in the 1970s. His single most famous composition is perhaps his opera Lou Salomé, which received its first production in Munich in 1981, with Karan Armstrong in the title role.

Sinopoli was appointed principal conductor of the Philharmonia in 1984, and served in this position until 1994, making a number of recordings with them, including music by Elgar and the complete symphonies of Mahler. Sinopoli was supposed to take over the position of chief conductor at Deutsche Oper Berlin in 1990. However, even before the start of his term he receded from his contract. He became principal conductor of the Staatskapelle Dresden in 1992. He also joined the Bayreuth Festival's roster of conductors. He is best known for his intense and sometimes controversial interpretations of opera, especially works by Italian composers and Richard Strauss. Sinopoli specialized in late-nineteenth century and early-twentieth century music, from Wagner and Verdi to Strauss, Mahler and the Second Viennese School. His conducting was the object of much controversy, especially in the symphonic genre, with some berating the "eccentricity" of his interpretations, while others praised the insightfulness of his often intellectual approach to works.

== Compositions ==
- Sintassi Teatrali (1968): "Frammento n. 48 da Alcmane", "Frammenti n.2-4-80 da Saffo", "Stasimo IV ed Esodo da Edipo Re di Sofocle"
- Erfahrungen (1968)
- 5 studi su 3 parametri, musica elettronica (1969)
- Musica per calcolatori analogici, musica elettronica (1969)
- Strutture per pianoforte (31 August 1969)
- Sunyata, Thema con varianti per soprano e quintetto d'archi su testo di Kridaya Sutra, (1970)
- Numquid et unum per clavicembalo e flauto (1970) dedicato a Franco Donatoni
- Isoritmi, musica elettronica (1971)
- Opus Daleth per orchestra (1971 al Teatro La Fenice di Venezia diretta da Ettore Gracis)
- Opus Ghimel per orchestra da camera (1971)
- Opus Schir per mezzosoprano e strumenti su liriche di Rolando Damiani (1971)
- Numquid per oboe, corno inglese, oboe d'amore (1972), dedicato a Lothar Faber
- Hecklephon per pianoforte, clavicembalo e celesta (1972)
- Per clavicembalo (1972), dedicato a Mariolina De Robertis
- Isoritmi II – Volts, musica elettronica (1972)
- Symphonie imaginaire per voci soliste, 10 voci bianche, 3 cori e 3 orchestre (1973)
- Klaviersonate per pianoforte (1977), dedicato a Katia Wittlich
- Klavierkonzert per pianoforte e orchestra (1974)
- Souvenirs à la mémoire per 2 soprani, controtenore e orchestra (1974) dedicato a Harry Halbreich
- Pour un livre à Venise per orchestra (1975). Prima raccolta: Costanzo Porta I – Contrappunto primo (dal Mottetto Gloriosa Virgo Caecilia di Costanzo Porta) II – Hommage à ---- Costanzo Porta III – Canzone "La Gerometta" (doppio coro) (da Costanzo Porta)
- Tombeau d'Armor I per orchestra (1976 al Teatro La Fenice)
- Requiem Hashshirim per coro a cappella (1976), dedicato a Paul Beusen
- Archeology City Requiem per orchestra (1976) Prima esecuzione Parigi, 31 gennaio 1977, inaugurazione del Centro Georges Pompidou
- Tombeau d'Armor II per grande orchestra (1977)
- Tombeau d'Armor III per violoncello e orchestra (1977)
- Quartetto per quartetto d'archi (1977)
- Kammerkonzert per pianoforte, fiati, percussioni, arpa, celesta e clavicembalo (1977–78)
- Lou Salomé, opera teatrale, libretto di Karl Dietrich Gräwe (1981)

== Death and legacy ==
On 20 April 2001 Sinopoli had a heart attack while conducting Giuseppe Verdi's Aida at the Deutsche Oper Berlin. The performance was supposed to serve as a reconciliatory appearance and dedicated to the memory of the company's chief director, Götz Friedrich. He was taken from the opera house to the German Heart Center in Berlin, where he was pronounced dead the following day. Two nights later, Marcello Viotti stepped in to conduct Aida, and dedicated his performance to Sinopoli's memory. The funeral in Rome on 23 April was attended by the Italian President and Prime Minister, as well as a large contingent from La Scala.

His books include Masterpieces of Greek Ceramics from the Sinopoli Collection. He died two days before he was due to receive his Laurea in Archeology at Università La Sapienza in Rome.

Sinopoli's last recordings include Richard Strauss's Ariadne auf Naxos and Friedenstag, as well as Dvořák's Stabat Mater.

== Giuseppe Sinopoli Festival ==
Every October since 2005, Taormina Arte has dedicated a festival to Giuseppe Sinopoli, the artistic director of the Music section of the Taormina Festival from 1989 to 1997. The Giuseppe Sinopoli Festival celebrates the man not only as a musician and as a conductor but also as a composer, a doctor, an archaeologist and intellectual, with a variety of events from music and literature, theatre and art to conferences, exhibitions, publications and concerts. Every year the Festival welcomes important orchestras to Italy.

On the occasion of the first edition of the Giuseppe Sinopoli Festival the Sinopoli Chamber Orchestra was formed, in collaboration with the Conservatorio "Arcangelo Corelli" of Messina. The Orchestra, made up of young talented musicians, both pupils and teachers of the Conservatorio, mostly performs works by Sinopoli.
