= Lamberto Tronchin =

Italian acoustician, engineer, theorist, musician

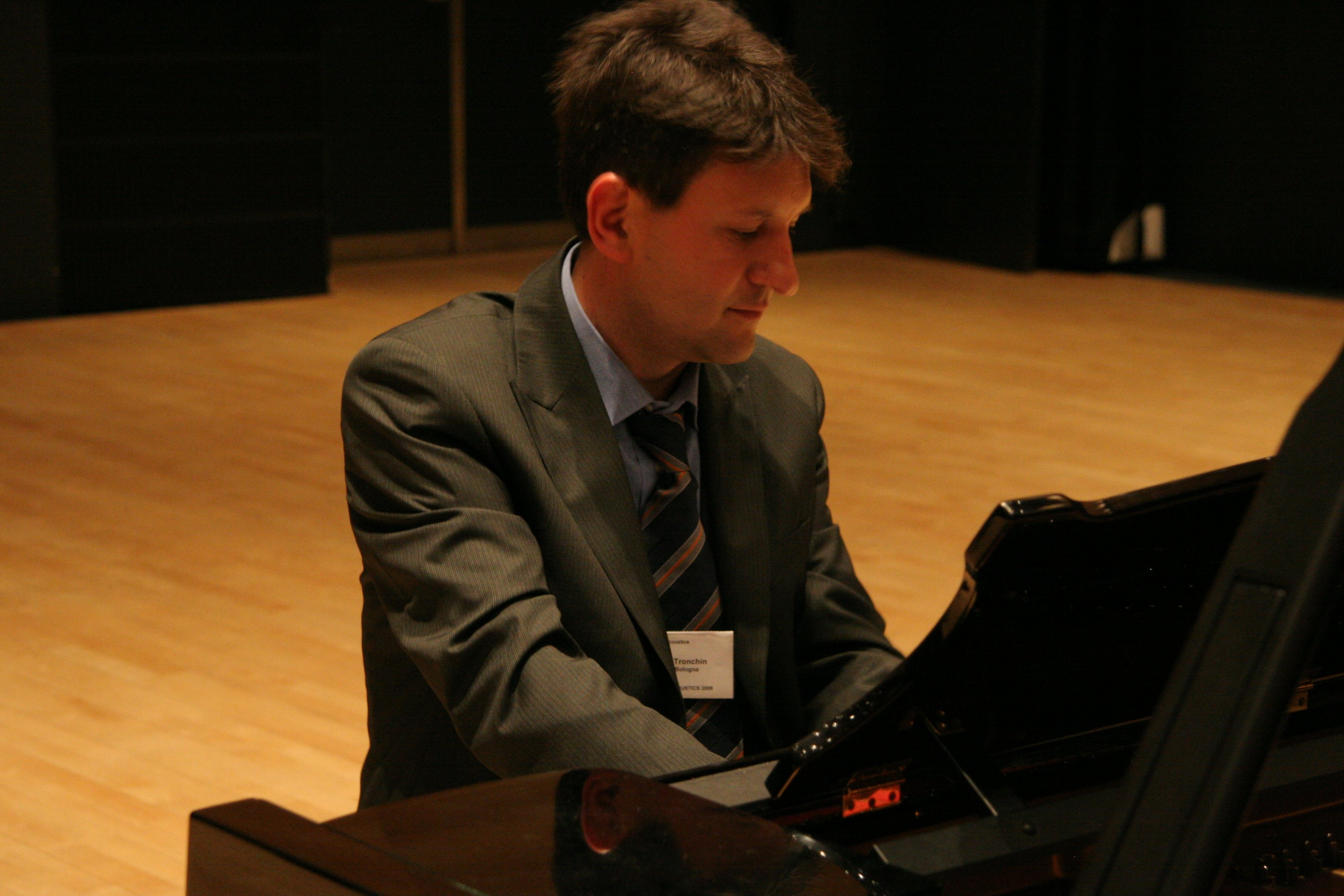
- Lamberto Tronchin in Copenhagen, 2006
- Born: Lamberto Tronchin; 27 March 1964 (age 62); Preganziol, Italy
- Years active: 1990 – present

Lamberto Tronchin (born 27 March 1964, Preganziol) is an Italian acoustician, engineer, theorist, musician, and professor of musical acoustics and environmental physics at the University of Bologna.

== Biography ==
He was graduated at University of Bologna in Civil and Building Engineering in 1992. After having studied at Conservatory of Ferrara and Venice, he received the Diploma in Piano performance at Conservatory of Reggio Emilia. Afterwards, he obtained the PhD in room acoustics in 1995 and was enrolled as assistant professor in 1999 at University of Bologna and as associate professor at the same university in 2011. He teaches musical acoustics at University of Bologna (DAMS). He worked as acoustic consultant in a number of projects regarding theatres, auditorium and buildings with a number of architects, including Richard Meier, Paolo Portoghesi, Paolo Bandiera, Francesco Bandiera, Giovanni Farolfi, Riccarda Cantarelli, and Luisella Pennati.

He made the unique acoustic measurements in the former Teatro La Fenice, in Venice, before its burning which occurred on 29 January 1996.

His contribution on musical acoustics includes the definition of a new parameter, the Intensity of Acoustic Radiation (IAR) that established a link between modal analysis of soundboards of musical instruments and their sound emission. His researches were reported in a number of articles and lectures, including TV programs in the Arté television broadcasting company. His researches about non linearity on musical acoustics allowed to release a patent about the emulation of non linear behavior of musical instruments and devices.

== Selection of projects and works ==
- Theatre Comunale, Gradisca d'Isonzo (1994)
- Theatre La Fenice, Venice (1995)
- Auditorium Del Carmine, Parma (1997)
- Theatre Pergine Spettacolo Aperto, Pergine (1997)
- Auditorium San Domenico, Foligno (1998)
- Parco Acquatico "Le Navi", Cattolica (2000)
- Auditorium Forum Guido Monzani, Modena (2001)
- Auditorium, Firenzuola (2001)
- Auditorium, Impruneta (2002)
- Theatre Comunale, Treviso (2003–05)
- Theatre Nuovo, Spoleto (2004–06)
- Theatre Eschilo, Gela (2008–09)
- Jesolo Lido Condo Building (2009–11)
- Theatre Galli, Rimini (2009–13)

== Awardes and patents ==
- 13 Mostra internazionale dell'architettura - Venice - Biennale dell'Architettura di Venezia, 2012 - Polish Pavilion - Special Mention "This brave and bold installation reminds the visitor to listen as well as to look... And to feel the sound of the Common Ground"
- METHOD FOR ARTIFICIALLY REPRODUCING AN OUTPUT SIGNAL OF A NON-LINEAR TIME INVARIANT SYSTEM
- The "Tuned City" project: lecture at Wiels, Brussels

== Bibliography ==
- Tronchin, Lamberto; Farina, Angelo (December 1997). "Acoustics of the former theatre -La Fenice- Venice". Journal of the Audio Engineering Society. 45 (12): 118–125.
- Farina, Angelo; Langhoff, Andreas; Tronchin, Lamberto (January 1998). "Acoustic characterisation of "virtual" musical instruments: using MLS technique on ancient violins". Journal of New Music Research. 27 (4): 359–379. doi:10.1080/09298219808570753.
- Farina, Angelo; Tronchin, Lamberto (July–August 2000). "On the "Virtual" Reconstruction of Sound Quality of Trumpets". Acta Acustica United with Acustica. 86 (4): 737–745.
- Tronchin, Lamberto (February 2005). "Modal analysis and Intensity of Acoustic Radiation of the kettledrum". The Journal of the Acoustical Society of America. 117 (2): 926–933. doi:10.1121/1.1828552. PMID 15759711.
- Farina, Angelo; Tronchin, Lamberto (March 2005). "Measurements and reproduction of spatial sound characteristics of auditoria" (PDF). Acoustical Science and Technology. 26 (2): 193–199. doi:10.1250/ast.26.193.
- Tronchin, Lamberto (January 2009). "Athanasius Kircher'S PHONURGIA NOVA: the marvelous world of sound during the 17th Century". Acoustics Today. 1 (5): 8–15. doi:10.1121/1.3120723.
- Tronchin, Lamberto (December 2012). "The Emulation of Nonlinear Time-Invariant Audio Systems with Memory by Means of Volterra Series". Journal of the Audio Engineering Society. 60 (12): 984–996.
- Tronchin, Lamberto (January–February 2013). "Francesco Milizia (1725-1798) and the Acoustics of his Teatro Ideale (1773)". Acta Acustica United with Acustica. 99 (1): 91–97. doi:10.3813/AAA.918592.
- Farina, Angelo; Tronchin, Lamberto (January–February 2013). "3D Sound Characterisation in Theatres Employing Microphone Arrays". Acta Acustica United with Acustica. 99 (1): 118–125. doi:10.3813/AAA.918595.
