= Giampaolo Coral =

Italian composer

- Born: 22 January 1944; Trieste, Italy
- Died: 17 February 2011 (aged 67) Trieste, Italy
- Occupation: Composer

Giampaolo Coral (22 January 1944 – 17 February 2011) was an Italian composer.

== Life ==
Coral was born on 22 January 1944 in Trieste. He began his musical career at age 14 as an organist in his native city of Trieste. After graduating in piano at the Benedetto Marcello Conservatory in Venice, he began his career as a substitute teacher at the Teatro Comunale Giuseppe Verdi in Trieste (1967–1973) and as a music consultant to the Teatro Stabile del Friuli Venezia Giulia and Veneto Teatro (1977–1985). He was also active as a choir director and as a teacher of "choral exercises" at the Giuseppe Tartini Conservatory of Music in Trieste (1971–2001). From 1982 he was a member of the Società Italiana degli Autori ed Editori the Italian Society of Authors and Publishers (SIAE).

Giampaolo Coral was essentially self-taught, but his spiritual teachers were Arnold Schoenberg and Franco Donatoni, with whom he had a long friendship.

He was the Artistic Director of the City of Trieste Music Prize, an international competition of musical composition and a member of the Federation of International Music Competitions of Geneva. In 1987 he founded an association in Trieste (Chromas – the Association of Contemporary Music), where he served as the Artistic Director. The same year, through the Chromas Association, he created the festival entitled "Trieste Prima – International Encounters with Contemporary Music." From 1995 to 2004 he was Artistic Director of the Music Sector of 'Trieste Contemporanea' (www.triestecontemporanea.it). In 1970 he made his debut in Germany, with his first orchestral work, "Requiem for Jan Palach and others"(1969), performed by the Stadt- Symphonie Orchester, Gelsenkirchen and then in 1971 in his hometown, at the Teatro Comunale Giuseppe Verdi, with "Magnificat" for soprano and orchestra that was reprised in 1973, in the Grosser Musikvereinssaal in Vienna by the ORF Symphony Orchestra and, in 1976, in Milan, by the Orchestra of the Italian State broadcaster RAI.

He composed several operas, including the ballet "Favola – pantomima romantica" ("Fable – romantic pantomime") (EW Korngold), represented in the 1981–1982 opera season at the Teatro Comunale Giuseppe Verdi in Trieste, "Il canto del cigno" ("Swan Song") (A. Chekhov), a prizewinner at the "Carl Maria von Weber" International Competition for Chamber Opera put on by the Dresdner Musikfestspiele and the Staatsoper Dresden. In 1983 he composed the opera "Mr. Hyde?" (RL Stevenson), performed in 2008 by the Teatro Verdi in Trieste as well as the chamber opera "Demoni e fantasmi notturni della città di Perla" ("Demons and Nocturnal Ghosts in the City of Pearl") performed at the Mittelfest in Cividale del Friuli in 1999 and the following year in Zagreb. He wrote four musical theatre shows for radio, one of which was performed, directed by Giorgio Pressburger, at the "Atelier sur la prise du son dans le théâtre radiophonique", held in Hilversum by the Union Européenne de Radiodiffusion. Also worthy of note was the production of incidental music (repeated approximately 2000 times) for 25 dramas performed in Italian and foreign theatres (Burgtheater Wien, Festival of Two Worlds Charleston, Narodno Kazalisce Zagreb, Schauspielhaus Graz, Ljubljana Slovensko Narodno Gledalisce, etc.), working with directors such as Franco Enriquez, Francesco Macedonio, Furio Bordon, Sandro Sequi, Paolo Magelli, Gianfranco De Bosio, Giorgio Pressburger and Franco Giraldi.

He mainly concentrated on composing orchestral and chamber music, including many sung and recited works. He also composed a substantial body of choral music with and without accompaniment. He won numerous international awards, including the City of Trieste International Competition Music Award, the Prince Pierre de Monaco Prix de Composition Musicale, the Gianfrancesco Malipiero (Treviso) Prize, the Music Composition Prize of the Hungarian Union of Composers (Budapest), the XIII Concurso Internacionale de Composicion Musical (Tolosa, Spain), the Concours Européen de Composition (Leuven, Belgium), the "Carl Maria von Weber" International Wettbewerb für Kammeroper" (Dresden), the "Ocar Esplà" Premio Internacional de Musica (Alicante), the Tone Tomsic International Prize for Music Composition (Ljubljana, Slovenia), the Concours International de Composition de Musique Sacré (Fribourg, Switzerland) and the International Edvard Grieg Memorial Competition for Composers (Oslo, Norway).

In 2012 the "Coral Award" was established, International Composition Competition was inserted (in alternate years) in the chamber music competition "Premio Trio di Trieste", organized by the Trieste Chamber Music.

== Bibliography ==
- Riemann Musiklexikon (Personenteil A-K, Ergänzungsband)
- Dizionario Enciclopedico Universale della Musica e dei Musicisti, Appendice, UTET, Turin (voce Giampaolo Coral)
- Dizionario Enciclopedico Universale della Musica e dei Musicisti, Il Lessico, UTET, vol. IV (voce Premi e concorsi, p. 5)
- Enciclopedia Italiana dei Compositori Contemporanei, Flavio Pagano Editore, Naples ISBN 8887463077
- Leonardo, Electronic Art Supplemental Issue, Leonardo/ISAST, Pergamon Press (England)
- The International Music Museum, London (scheda espositiva)
- International Who's Who in Music, International Biographical Centre Cambridge
- New Media in Late 20th Century (World of Art), Thames & Hudson London
- The Visual Computer, vol. 2, nr. 3, 1986, Springer Verlag Int., Berlin
- Itaco-Compositori Italiani 1985–1987, CIDIM, Rome 1989
- M. Vita, La musica italiana per arpa, Edizioni Bongiovanni, Bologna 1989
- A. Cataldi, Autoanalisi dei compositori italiani contemporanei, Flavio Pagano Editore, Napoli 1992 ISBN 888522816X
- D. Bertoldi – R. Cresti, Nuova Storia della Musica, Quaderno della rivista "Il Grande Vetro", Pisa 1992
- G. Radole, Trieste – La musica e i musicisti, Edizioni Pubbli-Service, Trieste 1992
- G. Radole, Le scuole musicali a Trieste, Edizioni Italo Svevo 1992
- Musicki Biennale Zagreb 1993, Croatian Composers Society, Zagreb 1993
- D. Bertoldi – R. Cresti, Civiltà Musicali, GDB Edizioni, Florence 1994
- AA. VV. (a cura di G. Botteri e M. Brandolin), 1954–1994 Teatro da Trieste, Edizioni Studio Tesi, Pordenone 1994 ISBN 8876925015
- Dieci anni di Musica Nuova a Trieste, Chromas Associazione Musica Contemporanea, Trieste 1996
- Muzicki Biennale Zagreb 1961 – 2001, Croatian Composers Society, Zagreb 2001
- Renzo Cresti, Il cuore del suono, Edizioni Feeria, Florence 2001 ISBN 9788887699258
- Storia d'Italia, Le Regioni, vol.2, 2002, Giulio Einaudi Editore
- Renzo Cresti, L'Arte innocente, Edizioni Rugginenti, Milan 2003 ISBN 8876654836
- Francois Régis Lorenzo, Frammenti sonori di un discorso politico, Narrative n°29, Université Paris Nanterre
- G. Coral, Demoni e fantasmi notturni della città di Perla. Biografia di Emilio Musul, un compositore. Quaderni di Cultura Contemporanea 9, Monfalcone 2008
