= Albert Patron =

Italian composer, philosopher, and music theorist

Alberto Patron (born December 26, 1969), also known as Albert Patron, is an Italian composer, music theorist, philosopher, lawyer, and writer. A pioneer of indeterminacy in music, aporetic music, and the non-standard use of musical instruments, Patron is the leading figure of the contemporary movement known as "Aporetic Music" and "Aporetic Philosophy".

Critics have lauded him as one of the most innovative composers since 1990.

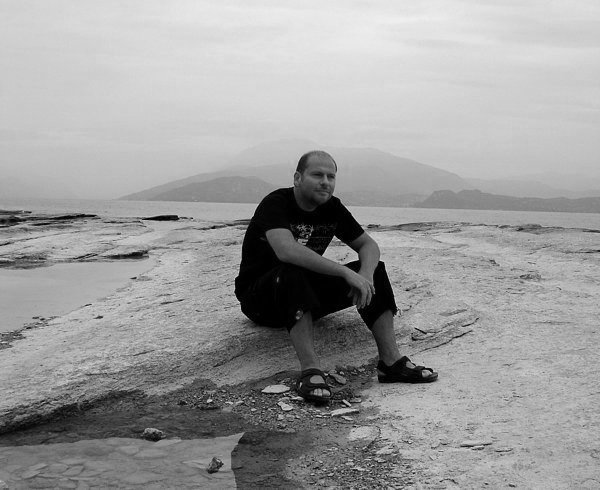
Alberto Patron

== Early life and education ==
Patron was born in Pordenone, Italy. He graduated from several Italian Conservatories, including the "Benedetto Marcello" of Venice, the "Venezze" of Rovigo, and the "Cesare Pollini" of Padua. He also earned a degree in Law from the University of Padua. His musical composers teachers included among many others, Giovanni Bonato, the american Walter Norris and Noël Lee and the famous contemporary composer Carlo De Pirro, prominent figures in contemporary music.

Through his studies of Greek philosophy in the late 1980s, Patron began exploring aleatoric and chance-controlled music (Chaos), leading to the foundation of the Aporetic Music movement in France in 1989. The I Ching, an ancient Chinese classic text, became a recurring conceptual tool in his compositions.

In addition to his musical and legal careers, Patron has held academic positions as a professor at Ca' Foscari University of Venice, Union Institute & Tech University, and Dillard University.

== Aporetic Philosophy and Aporetic Music ==
In 1989, Patron founded "Aporetic Philosophy", an intellectual movement that finds its primary aesthetic application in "Aporetic Music". In classical Greek philosophy, an aporia is defined as a logical impasse or an irresolvable paradox. Patron's philosophy conceptualizes the aporia not as a dead end, but as a creative gateway, translating intellectual doubt and structural paradoxes into acoustic experiences.

A foundational concept of his theoretical framework is the "Aporetic Triad" (Triade Aporetica). This triad redefines the traditional phenomenology of music by establishing an interdependent, dynamic, and unresolved relationship between three entities: the Composer, the Performer, and the Listener. Within this framework, the composer constructs an open-ended enigma; the performer is tasked with navigating the score's intentional ambiguities and indeterminacy, often employing extreme theatrical gestures; and the listener is actively challenged to confront the cognitive dissonance of the performance. Through the Aporetic Triad, music ceases to be mere passive entertainment and becomes a rigorous philosophical inquiry.

== Musical career ==
Patron's earliest finished works are stored in a private collection. According to the composer, these early works were short piano pieces composed using complex procedures and lacking in "sensual appeal and expressive power."

He gained international recognition for his contemporary piano cycle The Ten Aporetic Tropes (I Dieci Tropi Aporetici, published by Sillabe edition in Florence), which serves as the foundational acoustic tables for Aporetic Philosophy. The cycle aims to foster collective social progress through the intersection of music and ethics. It was recorded in the United States by the African-American pianist and scholar Prof. Lucius Weathersby for Albany Records and Navona Records. Patron has also composed extensively for the prepared piano (a piano with its sound altered by placing objects on the strings), notably the piece Hapax (1995). Among his most notable works is also Pillars for organ, published by Sillabe Edizioni (Livorno), a composition in which he explores and establishes the foundations of a new social semiotics.

A major milestone in his compositional output is Musicaenigmi, a highly theatrical contemporary work for piano trio (piano, violin, and cello) published by Armando Editore in Rome. The composition structurally and acoustically encodes the ancient Sator Square enigma. It features extended techniques such as extreme tremolos, reverse climaxes, and cello scordatura. Structurally, the piece consists of exactly 46 measures—a mathematical homage to 46 BC, known as the annus confusionis, the longest year in human history, reflecting the aporetic concept of the relativity of time. The original trio version of Musicaenigmi is scheduled to premiere at Carnegie Hall in New York in the spring of 2027.

== Literary work and publishing ==
Patron is the Editorial Director of the Music Book Series for Armando Editore in Rome, Italy.

Through this publisher, he has systematized his theories in a multi-volume treatise titled From the Aporetic Philosophy to the Aporetic Music. The structure of the treatise mirrors the Aporetic Triad:

- Volume 1 ("Introduction") was published in May 2025.
- Volume 2 ("The Listener") was released in March 2026.
- The upcoming Volume 3 ("The Performer") includes Patron's definitive philosophical and structural deciphering of the Sator Square enigma.
- Volume 4 ("The Composer") is currently in development.

== Principal honors and awards ==
- Second Prize, Gustav Mahler International Composer's Competition (2005).
- Gold Medal of the Order of Saint Stephen (August 3, 2021).
- Second Prize for musical literature, Concorso Giuseppe Verdi Letterati of Busseto (2026).
- Knight of the Order of Merit of the Italian Republic (Cavaliere al Merito della Repubblica Italiana), conferred by the President of the Italian Republic in September 2026.

== Cultural references ==
- SIAE on Patron voice.
- The Ten Aporetic Tropes for piano solo, album 1990.
- Joyful Joy, song inspired by a trip to New Orleans in 2000, featured on Spotify's best Christmas world songs (2025).
