= Ernesto Rubin de Cervin =

Italian composer and teacher

Ernesto Rubin de Cervin Albrizzi (5 July 1936 – 29 March 2013) was an Italian composer, musicologist and teacher.

== Biography ==
He was born in Venice in 1936. As a child he studied violin with Gian Francesco Malipiero at the Venice Conservatory, who suggested that he should start composition classes. He studied solfege with Bruno Maderna. After high school, he studied composition at the Florence Conservatory under Roberto Lupi and on a private basis with Luigi Dallapiccola.

Rubin de Cervin went to Rome in 1957 where he studied with Virgilio Mortari and Goffredo Petrassi. He was awarded a diploma in composition in 1960.

From 1965 to 1985 he taught, first solfege at the Liceo musicale in Udine, then didactic, analysis and composition at the Venice Conservatory. His teachings there established the New Venice School.

Whilst at the Benedetto Marcello Conservatory in Venice, he taught harmony and counterpoint to Giuseppe Sinopoli.
