= Lovers' Park (Yerevan) =

Public park in Yerevan, Armenia

Lovers' Park - Boghossian Gardens
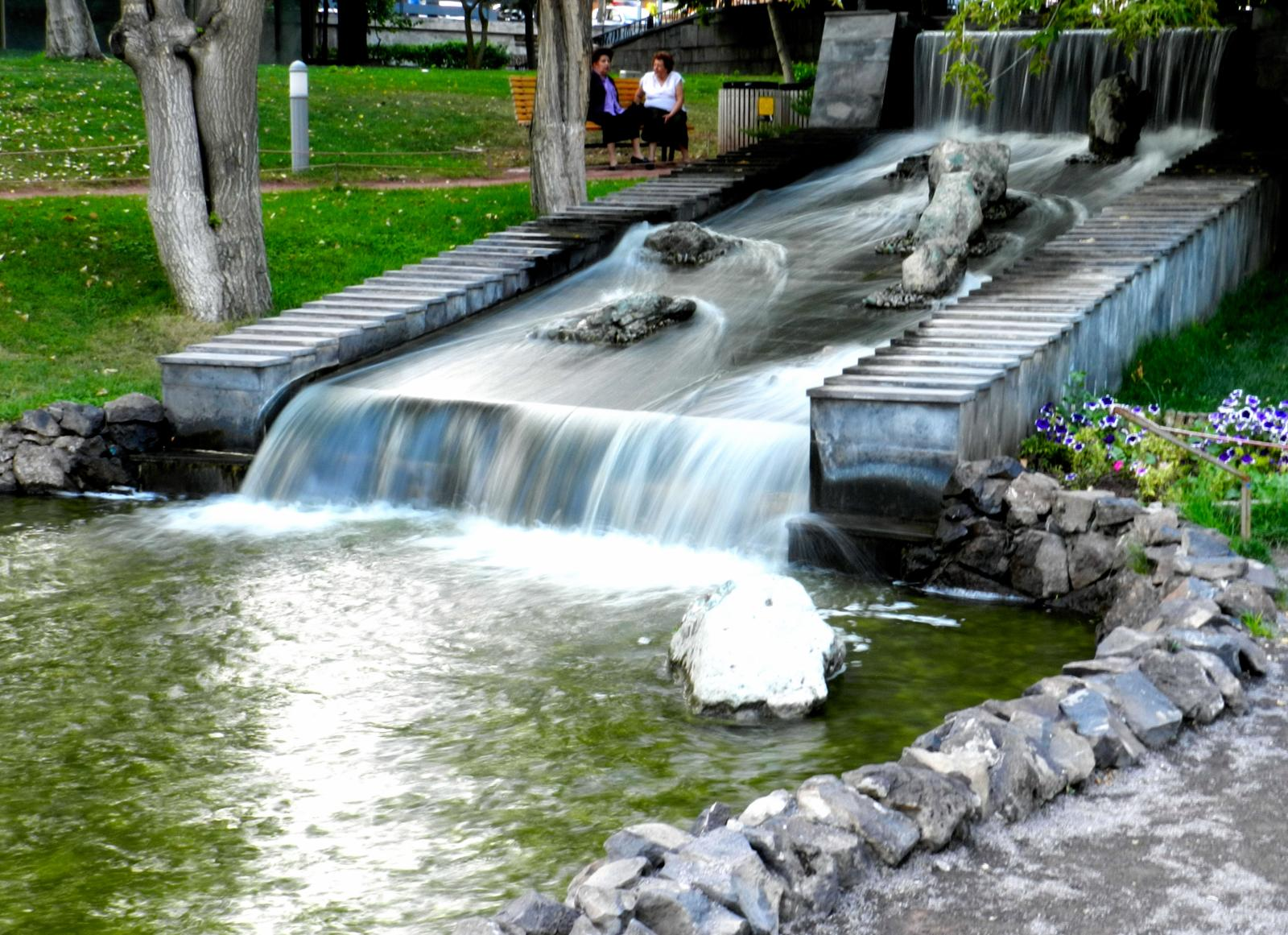
- Waterfalls at the Lovers' Park
- Interactive map of Lovers' Park - Boghossian Gardens
- Type: Public
- Location: Kentron District, Yerevan, Armenia
- Coordinates: 40°11′29″N 44°30′22″E
- Area: 2.5 hectare
- Created: 18th century
- Designer: Pierre Rambach
- Operator: Boghossian Foundation
- Status: Open all year
- Website: bg.am

Lovers' Park (Armenian: Սիրահարների այգի, Siraharneri aygi) is a public park in Yerevan, Armenia, located on Baghramyan Avenue. It occupies an area of 2.5 hectares in the central Kentron District of the city. The park was entirely renovated between 2005 and 2008 and reopened in November 2008 by the efforts of benefactor Albert Boghossian, head of Boghossian Foundation.

== Overview ==
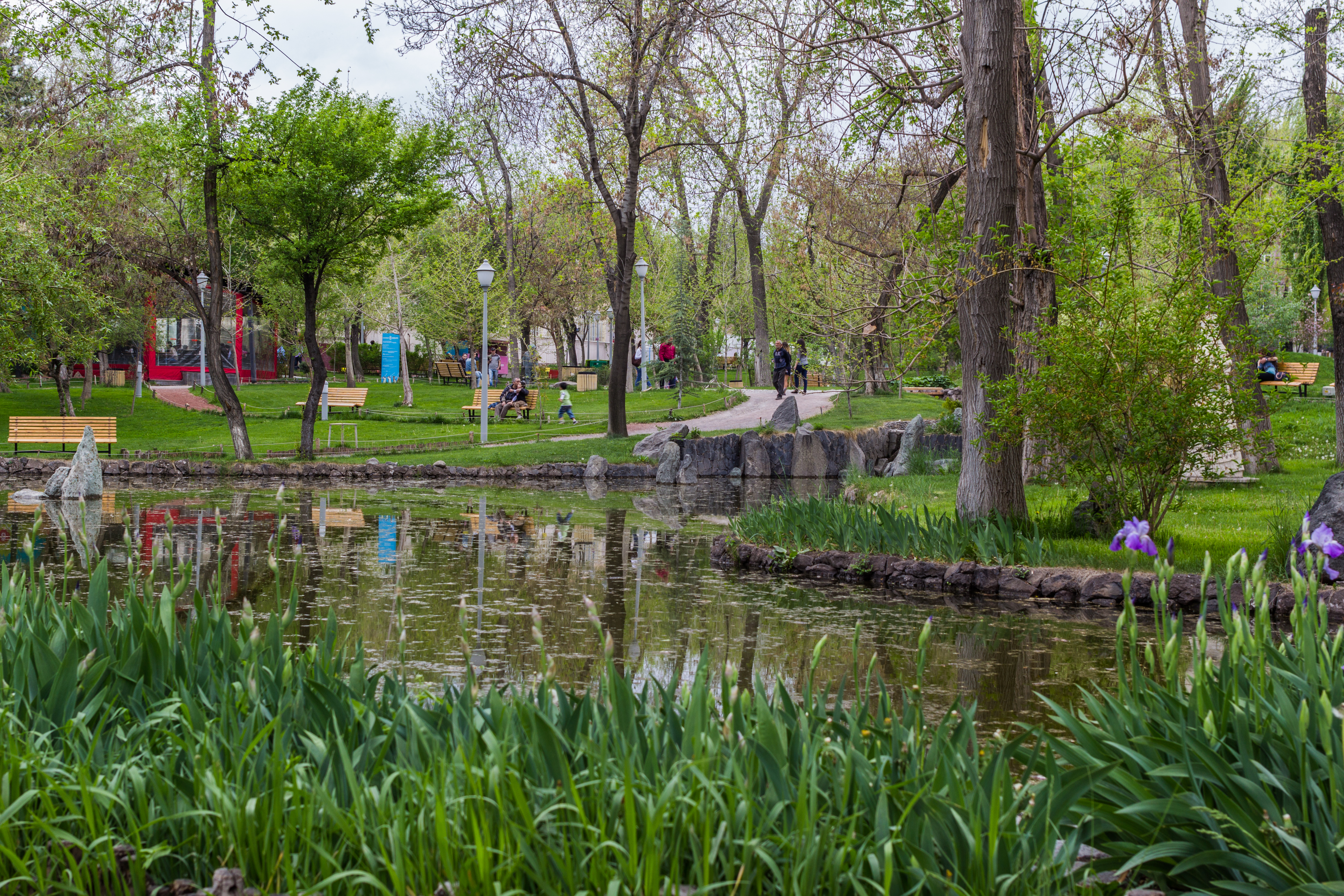
The pond and Achajur café at Lovers' Park

The park dates back to the 18th century, known as Kozern Park named after the Kozern district, a northwestern suburb of old Yerevan. It was well known for its medieval cemetery and its chapel.

After the World War II, the park was redesigned in 1949 and renamed Pushkin Park by the decision of the Council of Ministers of the Armenian Soviet Socialist Republic, as part of the celebration of the 150th anniversary of the birth of the renowned Russian poet Alexander Pushkin. Later in 1970, the park was named Barekamutyun (Friendship) as a tribute to the friendship of all Soviet Union member nations. In 1995, following the independence of Armenia, by the decision of the presidency of Yerevan City Council’s civil representatives, the park was renamed Lovers' Park Yerevan, based on the fact that the park had been a favorite rendezvous for many couples, during the second half of the 20th century.

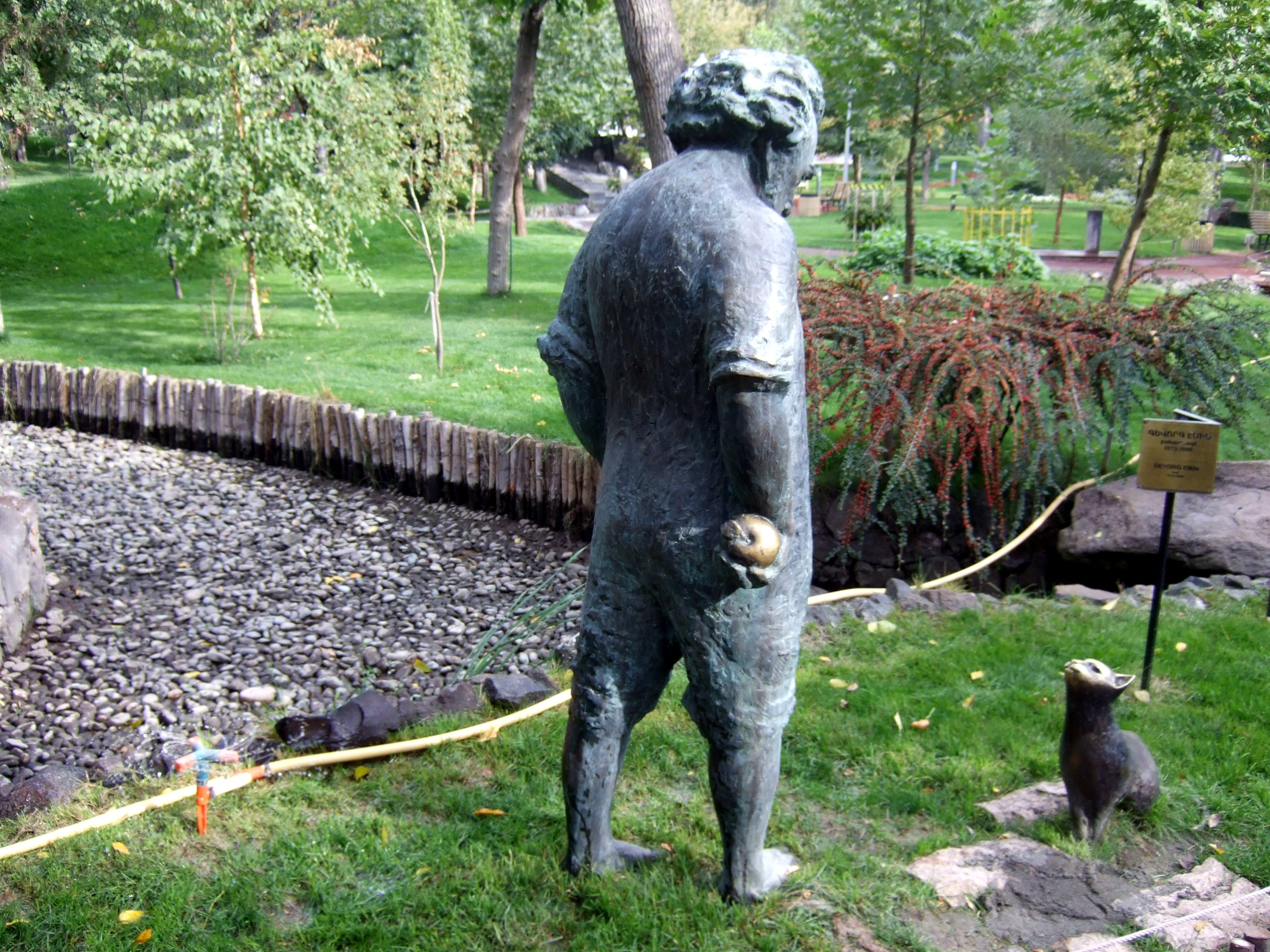
The statue of Gevorg Emin at the Lovers' Park Yerevan

In 2005, by the initiative of benefactor Albert Boghossian, the Boghossian Foundation assumed the renovation of the park, within the frames of Boghossian Gardens project. Following a year of research, French designer architect Pierre Rambach presented the sketches of the new Lovers' Park project in 2006 and received the approval of the Yerevan City Council. Pierre Rambach has visited Armenia several times to explore Armenian landscapes and find the best solutions to enable the combination of rigorous Japanese landscaping principles with the spirit of Armenia.

After being entirely renovated between 2005 and 2008, the Lovers' Park Yerevan was opened in November 2008. The park has no steps in order to enable an easy access of wheelchairs to all parts. It has a small café with many outdoor seats.

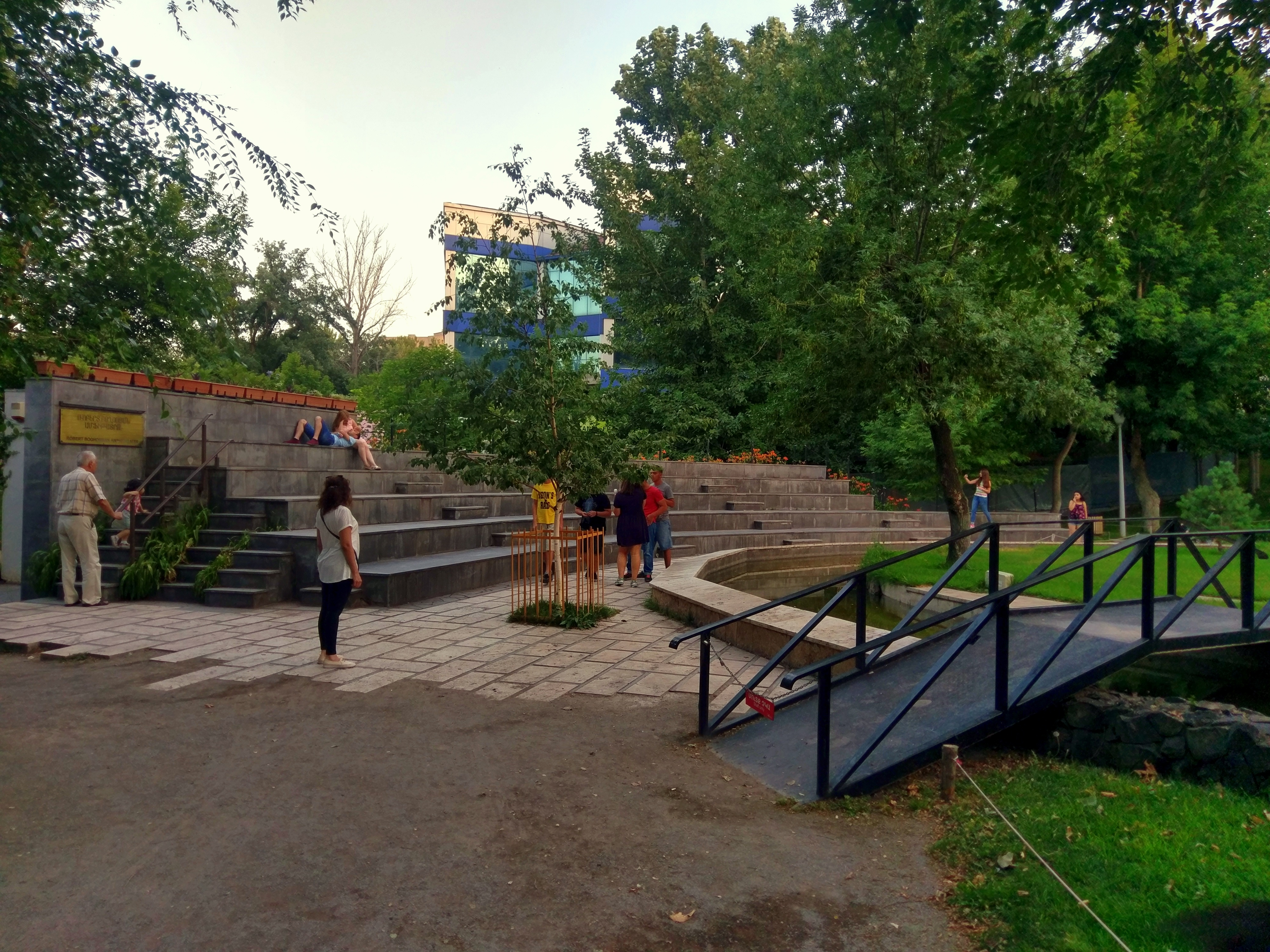
Robert Boghossian amphitheatre

The park is also home to a small amphitheatre with a capacity of 215 seats and a stage surface of 100 m², named after Robert Boghossian. The following events are held in the park:

- celebrations of the national holidays and feasts of Armenia
- open air movie screenings of The Golden Apricot International Film Festival
- open-air reading festivals
- music festivals
- live concerts
- exhibitions

In 2010, a statue of prominent Armenian poet Gevorg Emin, designed by sculptor Ashot Aramyan, was erected in the park. In 2014, the presentation of the art installation “Obsidian Heart” by artist Jean-Michel Othonie took place in the park.

The Marshal Baghramyan metro station stands at the northwestern corner of the Lover's Park since 1981.

== Facts and figures ==
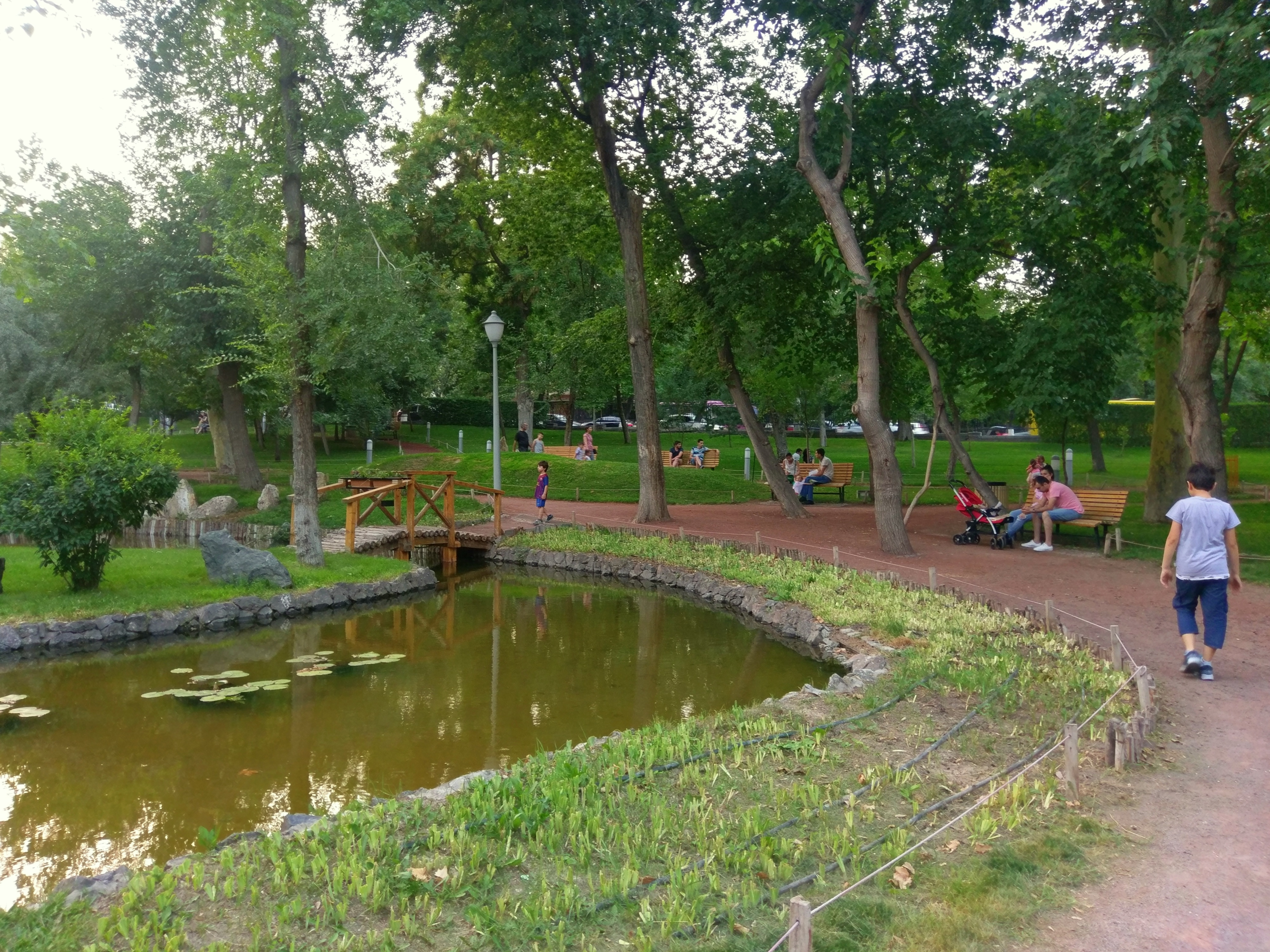
View from the park

- Total area: 1.6 hectare.
- Green area: 1.05 hectare.
- Number of trees: 370.
- Water surface: 0.11 hectare.
- Number of waterfalls: 4.
