= Claudio Ambrosini =

Italian composer and conductor

Claudio Ambrosini (born 9 April 1948) is an Italian composer and conductor.

== Biography ==
He studied foreign languages and literature at the Università di Milano graduating with an MA in 1972. Afterwards, he studied electronic music with Alvise Vidolin at the Venice Conservatory from 1972 to 1975. He also studied early instruments there from 1975 to 1978 and music history at the Università di Venezia, where he received an MA in 1978. He was influenced in his compositions by his encounters with Bruno Maderna and Luigi Nono.

He won the Prix de Rome in 1985. In 1986, he represented Italy at the UNESCO International Rostrum of Composers. In 2007, he received the Leone d'Oro per la Musica at the Biennale di Venezia. He has received commissions from RAI, WDR, the French government, the Teatro La Fenice, the Accademia Filarmonica Romana and from other institutions.

He has worked for the Centro per la Sonologia Computazionale in Padua since 1976. He is a professor with the department of information engineering of the University of Padua. In 1979, he founded the Ex Novo Ensemble in Venice, which is dedicated to the execution of contemporary music. In 1983, he founded the Centro Internazionale per la Ricerca Strumentale, where he is still director.
