= Vago Muradian =

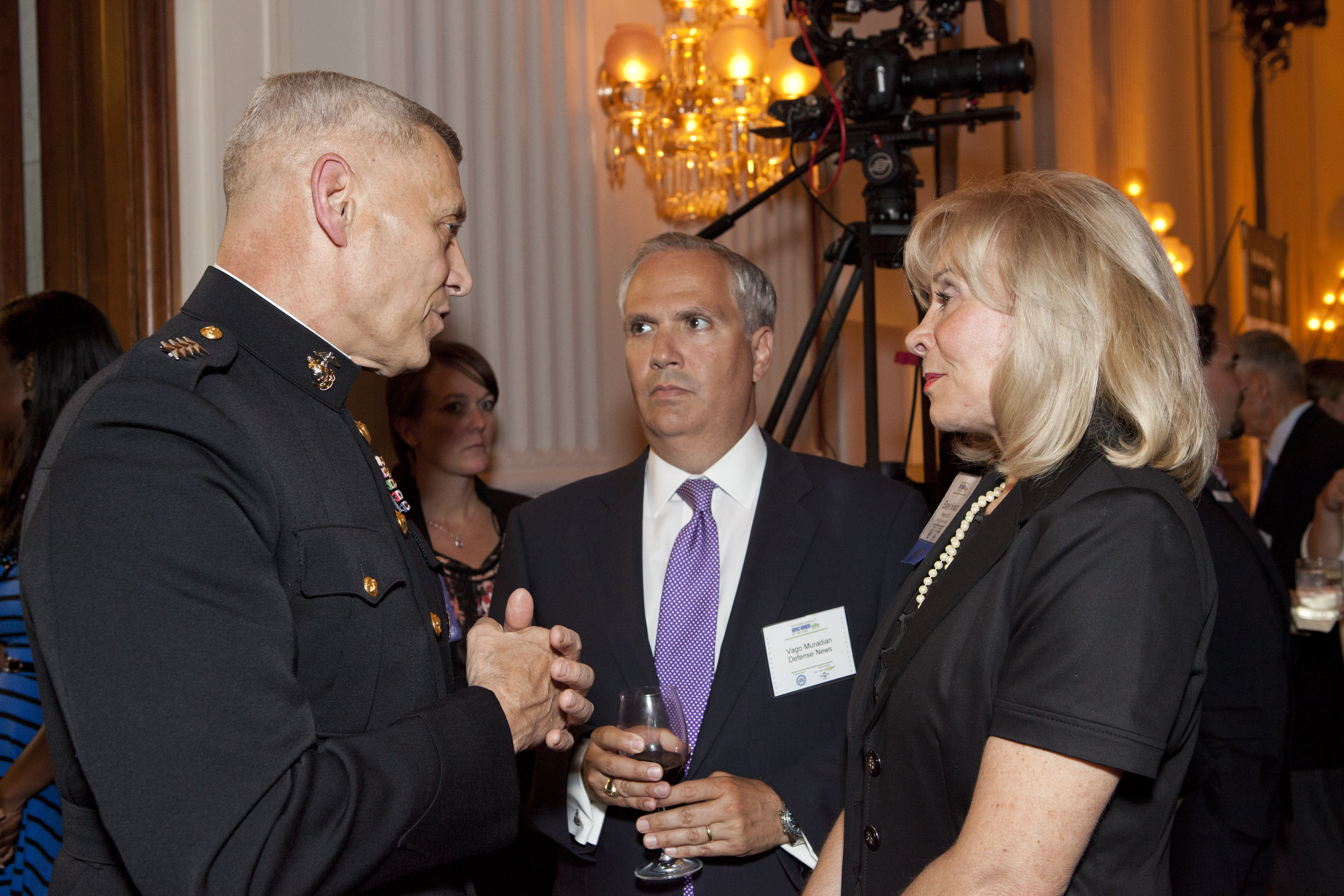

Vardges "Vago" Muradian is the editor-in-chief and host of the Defense & Aerospace Report, and hosts the Defense & Aerospace Business Report podcast and the Air Force Association's Airman for Life podcast. He is an American reporter, editor and commentator specializing in defense issues.

He previously worked as the editor of Defense News for 14 years, and was the founding host of This Week in Defense News with Vago Muradian, which aired on the American Forces Network. After his departure from Defense News in 2016, he founded the Defense & Aerospace Report.

Before joining Defense News, he served as founder and managing editor at Defense Daily International, and worked as a business and international reporter for Defense Daily, the leading U.S. daily newsletter covering the defense and aerospace industry. He won multiple awards while at Defense Daily, including for best breaking news coverage in 1998 for his series on the U.S. government’s rejection of the proposed merger between Lockheed Martin and Northrop Grumman. Muradian's reporting in Defense Daily International also played a major role in uncovering the US Department of Defense's desire to keep a competition going between the rival military jet manufacturers Boeing and Lockheed Martin and his reporting shed light on the differences between what was reported publicly and what was enacted privately.

He joined Defense Daily from Air Force Times, an independent U.S. publication covering the U.S. Air Force where he covered global operations, including in Europe, Haiti, Somalia and Zaire. Before covering the Air Force, Vago served as Defense News’ land warfare reporter. He began his career at Inside the Army.

Among the notables Muradian has interviewed over the years are former U.S. Secretary of Defense Robert Gates, current U.S. Secretary of the Navy Richard V. Spencer, current US STRATCOM Commander Gen. John Hyten, USAF, Canadian Minister of Defence Harjit Sajjan, German Navy Chief Vice Adm. Andreas Krause, Minecraft author and military futurist Max Brooks, and former Russian Prime Minister and now opposition leader Mikhail Kasyanov. Muradian has appeared often on C-SPAN as an expert on defense Issues.

Muradian has made numerous television appearances on C-SPAN, CNN, CNBC, MSNBC, conducted radio interviews with local stations as well as international outlets like the BBC, the Australian Broadcasting Corporation, Swiss TV and others. His work has been extensively cited in books and he has been quoted in publications including "The Economist".

He also serves as a speaker, panelist and moderator for security conferences around the world, and lectures on the military and the media, including at the Defense Acquisition University. He is a member of the National Press Club and the Naval Submarine League. A native of New York City, Muradian lives in Washington, D.C., with his family.

He is the son of the noted Armenian born Armenian-American composer Vazgen Muradian (1921-2018). He is a graduate of the George Washington University from which he received his Bachelor's of Arts degree in 1991.
