= Gabriele Bianchi =

Italian composer

Olympic medal record

Art competition
| Bronze medal – third place | 1948 London | Vocal |

Gabriele Bianchi (27 August 1901 – 8 October 1974) was an Italian composer, conductor and teacher.

He was born in Verona and died in Mirano. He studied with Gian Francesco Malipiero at the Venice Conservatory. He was director of the Trieste Conservatory from 1955 and director of the Venice Conservatory from 1960 to 1971. When he was 29 years old, he participated in Biennale della Musica di Venezia with his composition Concerto per orchestra.
