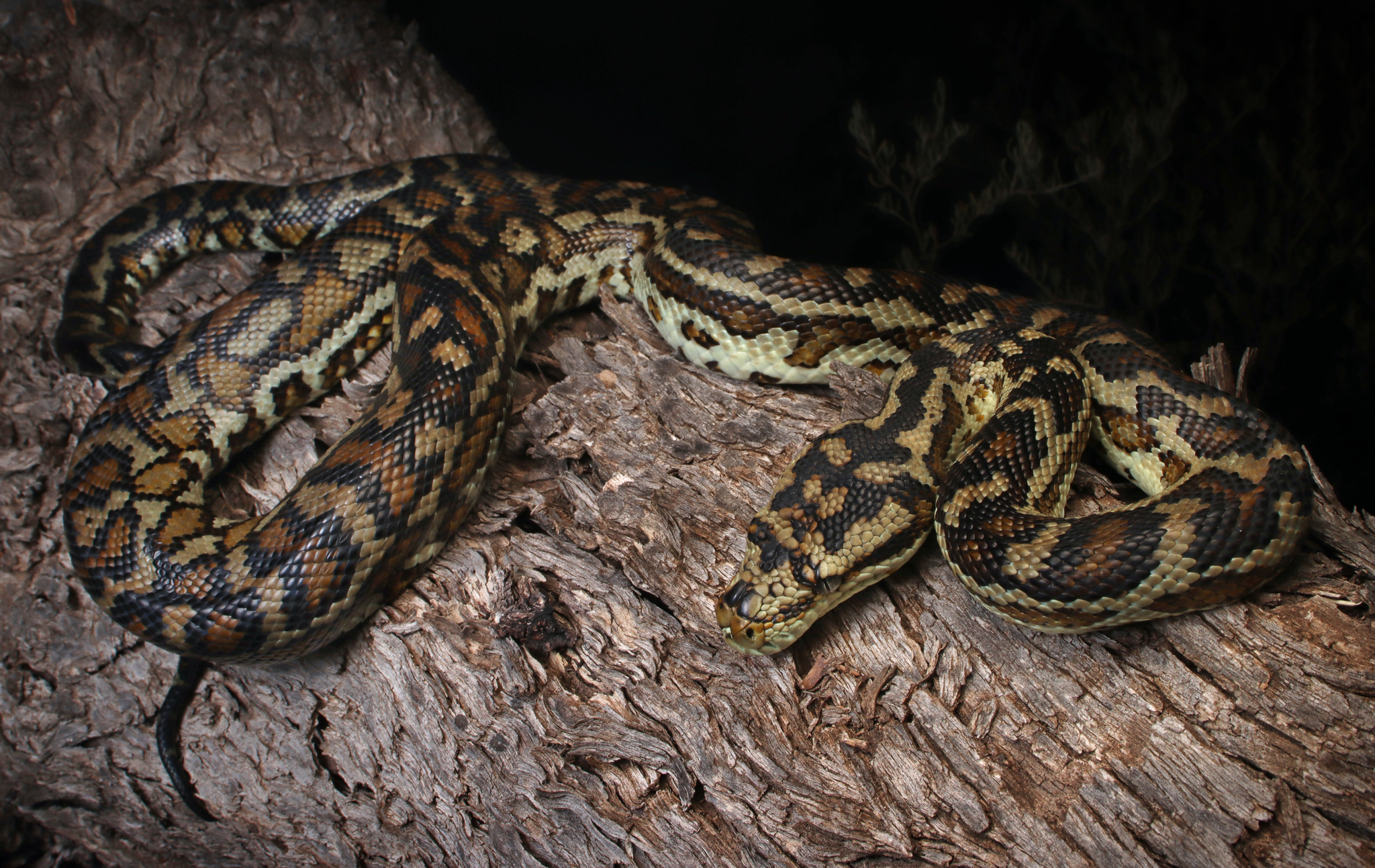
- Southwestern carpet python (Morelia imbricata) in South Australia

Conservation status
- Near Threatened (IUCN 2.3)

Scientific classification
- Kingdom: Animalia
- Phylum: Chordata
- Class: Reptilia
- Order: Squamata
- Suborder: Serpentes
- Family: Pythonidae
- Genus: Morelia
- Species: M. imbricata

Binomial name
- Morelia imbricata (L.A. Smith, 1981)

Synonyms
- Python spilotus imbricatus L.A. Smith, 1981; Morelia spilota imbricata — Franz, 2003; Morelia imbricata — Greer, 2006

= Morelia imbricata =

Species of snake

Morelia imbricata, also known commonly as the southwestern carpet python, is a large species of snake in the family Pythonidae. It is a constrictor and is not venomous. The species is native to southern regions of Western Australia and western regions of South Australia.

== Taxonomy ==
Morelia imbricata is closely related to other Australian diamond or carpet pythons (genus Morelia). The abundant and well known genus Morelia contains six species across Australia.

== Description ==
Morelia imbricata may attain a total length (tail included) of up to 2.3 m (7.5 ft), with a snout-to-vent length (SVL) of 2.0 m (6.6 ft). This species has a well defined neck and small scales across the head. Males may be up to 1.1 kg (2.4 lb) in weight, but females may be four times heavier when fully grown. Larger individuals have been reported as being 4 m (13 ft) in total length.

Several other similar pythons occur in its range. The woma, Aspidites ramsayi, lacks the obvious neck of M. imbricata, and the western Stimson's python, Antaresia stimsoni stimsoni, has a higher number of ventral scales.

== Habitat ==
The preferred natural habitat of Morelia imbricata is coastal areas, woodland, heathland, and semiarid areas. It is often found in woodlands of Eucalypt and Banksia, or amongst grasses or low growing shrubs.

== Behavior ==
Morelia imbricata is discreet and slow moving, spending most of its time hidden, though occasionally it is seen attempting to cross roads. Typically this python is sedentary, but females in a survey at Garden Island were noted to be active most of the year. M. imbricata takes up residence in deep crevices or holes in limestone, on granite, in dense heath, and animal burrows.

== Diet ==
Morelia imbricata eats geckos, house mice, birds, and marsupials, including the tammar wallaby. The young of brooding red-eared firetails, Stagonopleura oculata, were taken from a nest being observed. A numbat was also observed to be captured and eaten by the southern carpet python.

== Home range ==
An individual Morelia imbricata may have a large home range, occupying hollow logs in cooler months and wandering across areas up to 20 ha (49 acres). Males tend to have a larger home range. They appear to return to the same sites, even after long absences, which may contribute to a threat of extinction.

== Conservation ==
Morelia imbricata is widespread and thought to have large populations, but is exposed to the threatening processes of its distribution range. Noted in the assessment of its conservation status are land clearing and altered fire regimes, as it typically occupies a large undisturbed habitat. The impact of introduced predators, known to be foxes and cats, have not been assessed. Population densities have declined in the Esperance region. The various threat assessments have described it as near threatened (Red list 2000) and "specially protected fauna" under its region's Wildlife Conservation Act. The hollow logs favored by the species are not produced by altered fire regimes or cleared in plantations.

== Geographic range ==
Morelia imbricata occupies all the regions of Southwest Australia, a typical Mediterranean climate, and into the central arid and semiarid regions. The northern extent is to Northampton north of Geraldton and it is found as far east as the Eyre Peninsula. The python also occurs on islands at the Houtman Abrolhos, Garden Island, and the Archipelago of the Recherche. There are records of the species beyond the eastern mainland range from St Francis Island in South Australia's Nuyts Archipelago.
