= Isles of St Francis Conservation Park =

- IUCN category Ia (strict nature reserve)
- Location within South Australia
- Location: South Australia
- Nearest city: Ceduna
- Coordinates: 32°30′50″S 133°17′22″E
- Area: 12.36 km^{2} (4.77 sq mi)
- Established: 16 March 1967
- Governing body: Department of Environment and Natural Resources (2011)

Isles of St Francis Conservation Park
- Interactive map of Isles of St Francis Conservation Park

Register of the National Estate
- Official name: Register of the National Estate
- Designated: 21 October 1980
- Reference no.: 6741

Isles of St Francis Conservation Park was a protected area in the Australian state of South Australia located on islands within the Isles of St Francis off the west coast of Eyre Peninsula about 562 kilometres (349 mi) north-west of the state capital of Adelaide and about 50 kilometres (31 mi) south-west of the town of Ceduna.

The conservation park consisted of land on ten (sic) islands within the Isles of St Francis which form the south-westerly extension of the Nuyts Archipelago. (Note: The management plan for the conservation park states on its page 2 that the Isles of St Francis has a membership of ten islands while another part of the Government of South Australia and the Australian Heritage Database both state that there are only nine islands in the Isles.)

The land first received protected area status as a pair of fauna conservation reserves proclaimed on 16 March 1967 under the Crown Lands Act 1929 in respect to Freeling Island and Smooth Island. Additional fauna conservation reserves were proclaimed on 4 November 1967 in respect to Dog Island, Egg Island, Fenelon Island, Hart Island, Masillon Island, West Island and all of St Francis Island with exception to section 220 which had been acquired by the Australian government. On 27 April 1972, all of the land proclaimed as fauna conservation reserves was reconstituted as the Isles of St Francis Conservation Park under the National Parks and Wildlife Act 1972. On 19 December 1991, additional land was added to the conservation park to extend protection over land located between high tide and low tide. As of 2010, the conservation park covered an area of 12.36 square kilometres (4.77 sq mi).

On 25 August 2011, all of the land within the conservation park was constituted as part of the Nuyts Archipelago Wilderness Protection Area with the result that the conservation park ceased to exist.

In 1980, the conservation park was described as follows:

St Francis Island is the site of a reintroduction program for the endangered brush tailed bettong (Bettongia penicillata), which became extinct on the island in the early 1900s. St Francis Island is also one of only two islands in South Australia which has a population of the vulnerable southern brown bandicoot (Isoodon obesulus). This island also supports a population of the carpet snake (Morelia spilota), which is vulnerable in South Australia and in decline throughout its mainland range. Several rare or uncommon bird species breed on the Isles, including Cape Barren goose (Cereopsis novaehollandiae), the second rarest goose species in the world and the banded rail (Rallus philippensis). Significant breeding colonies of Australian sea lion (Neophoca cinerea), one of the rarest marine mammals in the world, occur on Fenelon and West Islands… St Francis granite formation outcrops on eastern St Francis Island and this is a type locality… The Isles also support a large breeding population of short tailed shearwaters (Puffinus tenuirostris). New Zealand fur seals (Arctocephalus forsteri) breed on Fenelon Island...

This group of nine islands lies off the coast of South Australia near Ceduna, beyond the Nuyts Archipelago group of islands. The total area covered by the group is 1,312 ha, the largest islands in the group being St Francis Island (809ha), Masillon Island (202 ha) and Egg, Dog and West Islands (all 60 ha in area). The islands consist of limestone and sand over granite bases. Nuyts Volcanics formation outcrops on western St Francis Island, and St Francis Granite formation outcrops on eastern St Francis Island. Both are considered geological monuments. The vegetation on the larger islands consists mostly of coast saltbush (Atriplex cinerea) shrubland on the low-lying areas, with grassland and scattered low shrubs covering the remainder. Populations of bush rat (Rattus fuscipes) occur on Dog and Masillon Islands. St Francis is also the site of a breeding population of short-tailed shearwaters (Puffinus tenuirostris). Other birds which breed on the Isles include Cape Barren goose (Cereopsis novaehollandiae), banded rail (Rallus philippensis), rock parrot (Neophema petrophila) and little penguin (Eudyptula minor). Significant breeding colonies of Australian sea-lion (Neophoca cinerea) occur on Fenelon and West Islands and New Zealand fur seals (Arctocephalus forsteri) breed on Fenelon Island…

For most of these islands, pastoral leases have been held since the late 1800s. St Francis Island is the most disturbed of the group, a large part of it having been cleared and the whole island grazed by sheep, but the vegetation is now recovering. Introduced plants are common on St Francis Island. The remaining islands are in their natural state.

The conservation park was classified in 2010 as being an IUCN Category Ia protected area. In 1980, it was listed on the now-defunct Register of the National Estate.

== See also ==
- Protected areas of South Australia
- Nuyts Archipelago Conservation Park

== Notes and references ==
=== Attribution ===
- This article incorporates text by Commonwealth of Australia available under the CC BY 3.0 AU licence.
