= St Peter Island (South Australia) =

Island in South Australia

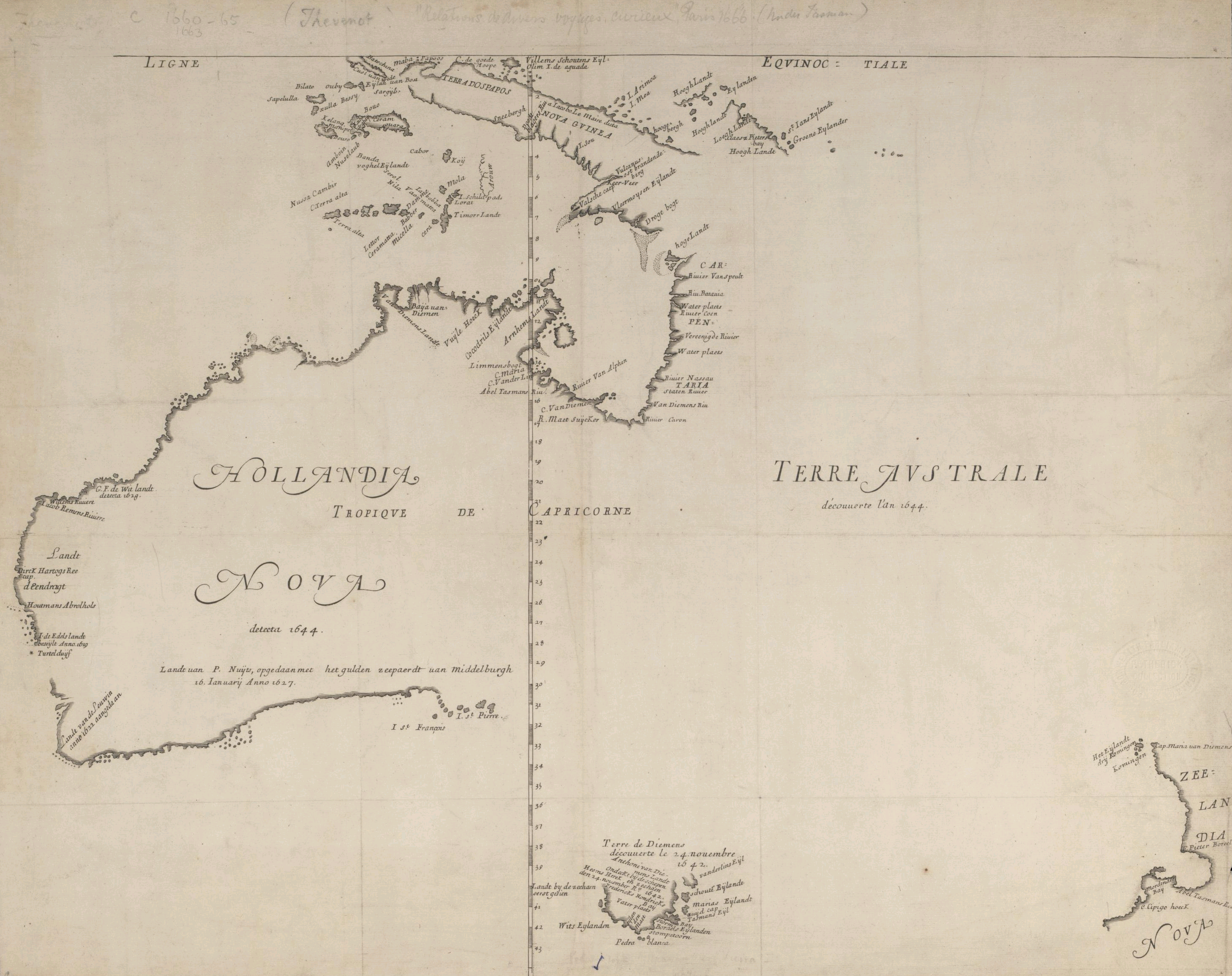
- The island appears on this 1644 map as "I St. Pierre"

- Location within South Australia

Geography
- Location: Great Australian Bight
- Coordinates: 32°17′S 133°34′E
- Archipelago: Nuyts Archipelago

Administration
- Australia

St Peter Island (originally in Dutch: Eyland St. Pierre) is an island in the Nuyts Archipelago on the west coast of Eyre Peninsula in South Australia near Ceduna. It is the second largest island in South Australia and about 13 km (8.1 mi) long. It was one of the first parts of South Australia to be discovered and named by Europeans, along with St Francis Island, mapped by François Thijssen in 't Gulden Zeepaert in 1627.

Seal hunting took place on the island in the 1820s and 1830s. Archaeological investigations have also located whale vertebra at the site.

The historic St Peter Island Whaling Sites are listed on the South Australian Heritage Register as a designated place of archaeological significance.

== Protected area status ==
=== Statutory reserves ===
The island is part of the Nuyts Archipelago Conservation Park while the waters surrounding its shores are in the Nuyts Archipelago Marine Park.

=== Non-statutory arrangements ===
==== Important Bird Area ====
The island is part of the Nuyts Archipelago Important Bird Area (IBA), so identified by BirdLife International because it supports over 1% of the world populations of short-tailed shearwaters, white-faced storm-petrels and pied oystercatchers. The island lies across the Yatala Channel from the separate Tourville and Murat Bays Important Bird Area, just west of Ceduna on the mainland.

== See also ==
- List of islands of Australia
- Woylie
- Greater stick-nest rat
