= Nuyts Archipelago =

Group of islands off Southern Australia

Coordinates: 32°19′44″S 133°37′31″E

Geography
- Location: Great Australian Bight

Administration
- Australia

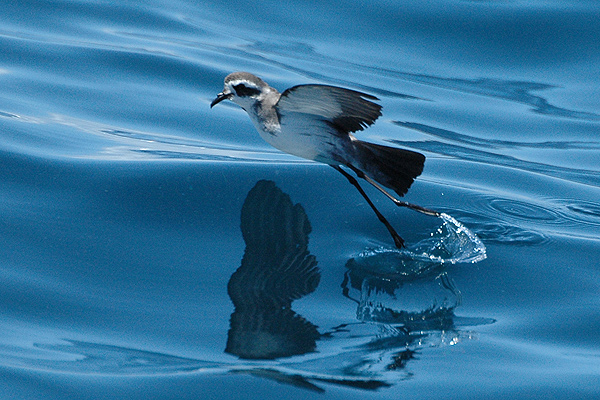
The archipelago is an important breeding site for white-faced storm petrels…

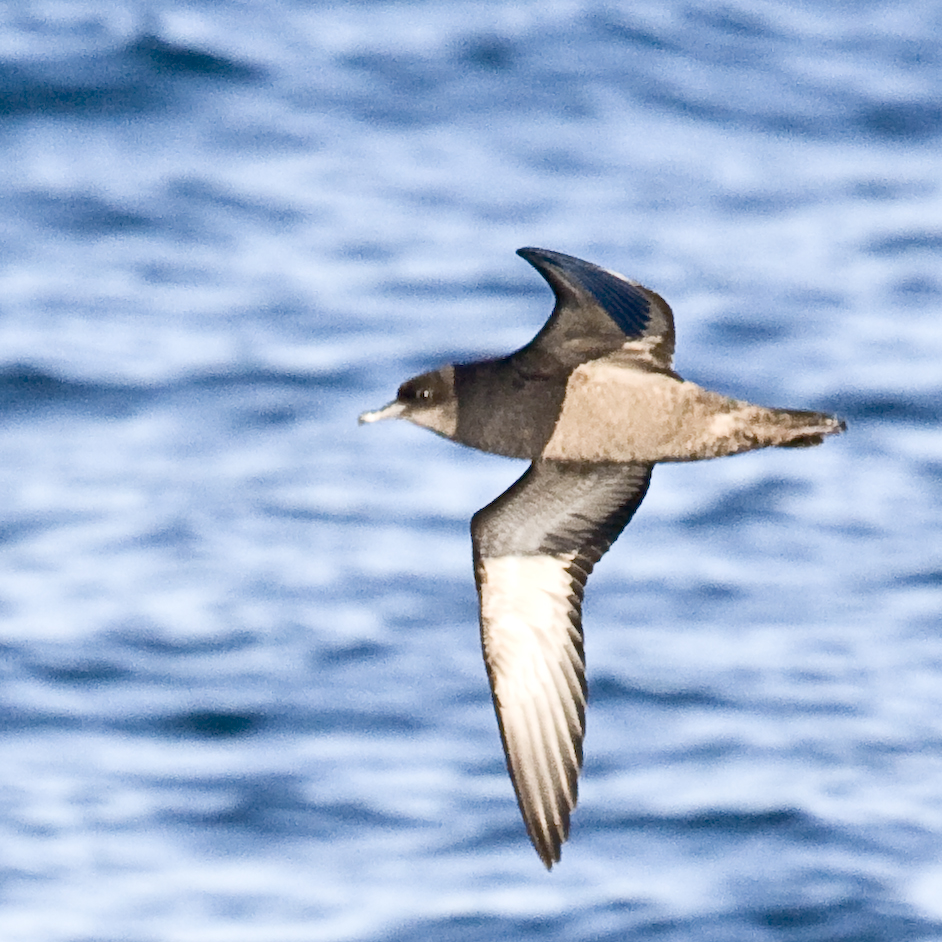
…short-tailed shearwaters…

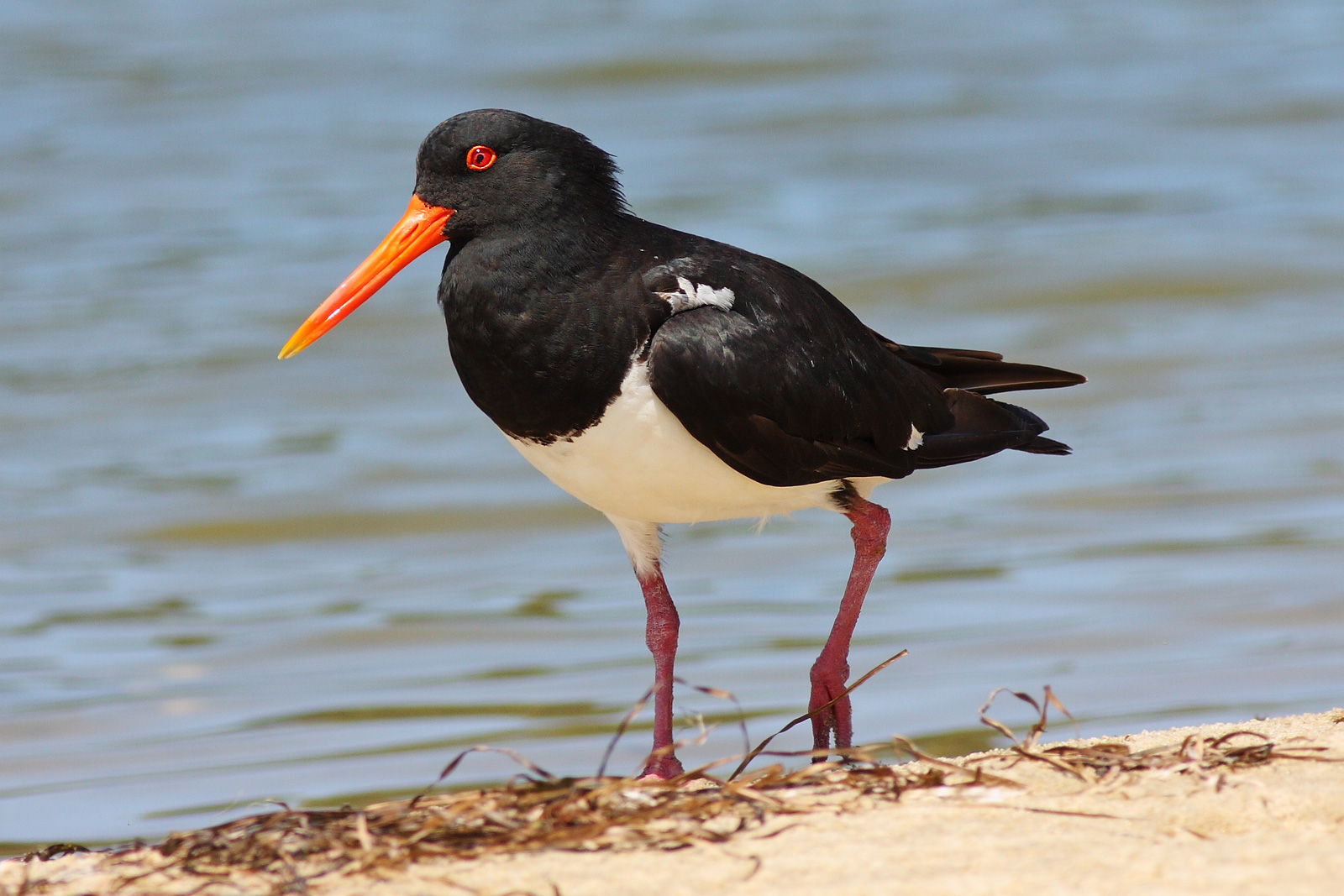
…and pied oystercatchers…

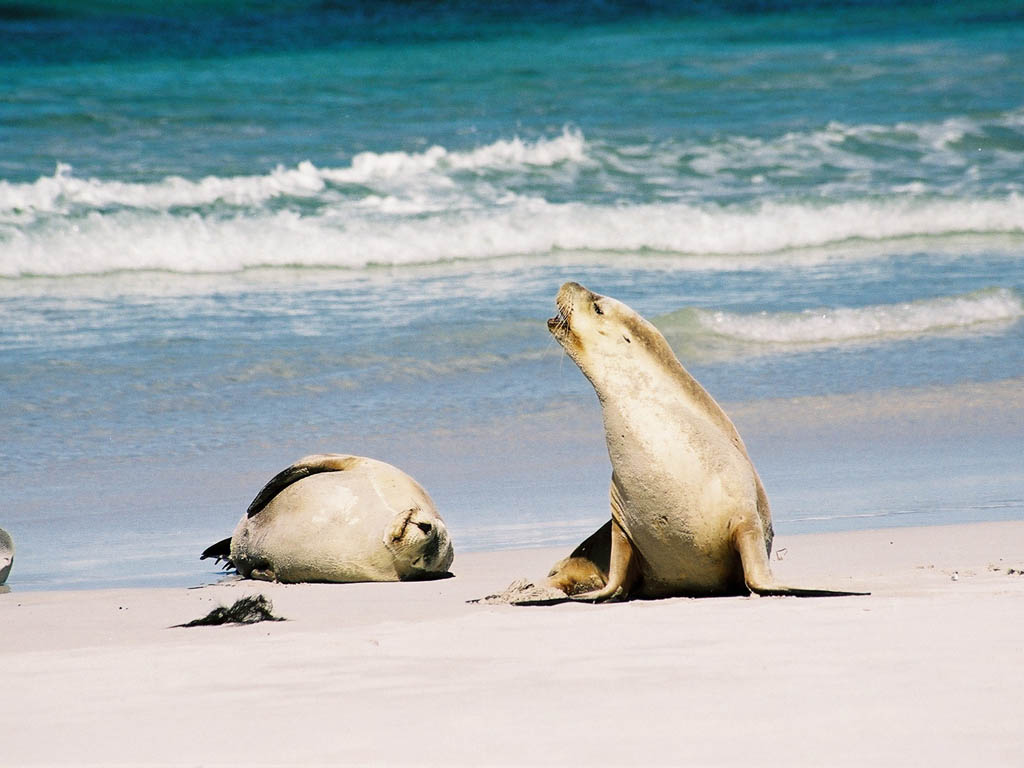
…as well as Australian sea lions

The Nuyts Archipelago is an island group in South Australia in the Great Australian Bight, to the south of the town of Ceduna on the west coast of the Eyre Peninsula. It consists of mostly granitic islands and reefs that provide breeding sites for Australian sea lions and support colonies of short-tailed shearwater. It also includes the island group known as the Isles of St Francis. All the islands, with the exception of a part of Evans Island, are located within the protected areas of the Nuyts Archipelago Wilderness Protection Area and the Nuyts Archipelago Conservation Park.

== Description ==
Of the roughly 30 islands and reefs in the archipelago, those lying furthest from the coast of the Eyre Peninsula are the Isles of St Francis, after the largest. Most of the islands are formed of calcarenite lying on granite; where the softer calcarenite is close to sea level it has been heavily eroded by wave action.

The area is biologically unique in South Australia due to the influence of the Leeuwin Current, flowing eastwards across the Great Australian Bight and bringing features more typical of western than south-eastern Australia. In and around the archipelago the subtropical Leeuwin Current meets and mixes with the colder waters of the Flinders Current creating a biodiversity hotspot. Examples of the effect of the Leeuwin Current include the presence of plate corals and fish such as the Western Footballer.

== History ==
Prior to the last ice age, approximately 9,800 years ago, the islands formed part of the mainland coastline.

The archipelago was named in 1802 by Matthew Flinders after Dutch diplomat Pieter Nuyts, who was the senior official of the Dutch East India Company on the ship 't Gulden Zeepaert ("The Golden Seahorse"), captained by François Thijssen who mapped 1800km of the southern coastline of Australia from Albany to Ceduna in the course of a 1626–27 voyage from the Netherlands to Formosa and Japan. Nuyts was in the region of the archipelago in January 1627. The remote and desolate islands were later arguably also used as a source in the 1726 novel Gulliver’s Travels. Both Flinders and Nicolas Baudin, who also explored the area in 1802-1803, named several of the islands.

During the early 19th century the archipelago and adjacent coast were used as a base for sealing and for whaling, usually by Hobart-based entrepreneurs who established whaling stations on St Peter Island as well as at Fowlers Bay and Streaky Bay. Early interactions by sealers with the mainland native people were usually hostile. Later, the islands were privately purchased in 1925 and used for farming and sheep grazing.

== List of constituent islands ==
=== St Francis Island ===
St Francis Island was named in 1627 by Thijssen after his patron saint, at 809 hectares (2,000 acres) it is the second largest island in the archipelago. It is covered by a mix of grassland, saltbush and low shrubland and supports a large population of muttonbirds (estimated at 273,000 pairs). The highest point, 81 metres (266 feet) above sea level, carries an automated lighthouse and radio beacon. It has a long history of agricultural use as well as of guano mining.

=== Masillon Island ===
Masillon Island is located about 2.5 kilometres (1.6 miles) south of St Francis, it was named in 1802 in the course of Baudin’s expedition after a Bishop of Clermont, Jean Baptiste Massillon. It is vegetated with heathy shrubland and saltbush, and supports muttonbirds (39,520 pairs).

=== Fenelon Island ===
Fenelon Island is located about 1.5 kilometres (0.93 miles) south of Masillon, it was named by Baudin after François Fénelon, a French archbishop and theologian. It features heathland on shallow soils and supports a large population of white-faced storm petrels (13,000 pairs), as well as a sea lion breeding colony.

=== Smooth Island ===
Smooth Island is a dome-shaped island with a covering of dense, low scrub, it lies 200 metres (660 feet) north of St Francis.

=== Egg Island ===
Egg Island is located about 400 metres (1,300 feet) north-east of St Francis, it is dome shaped with a high point 41 m above sea level. It has deep soils and muttonbirds (400 pairs).

=== Dog Island ===
Dog Island is located about 300 metres (980 feet) east-north-east of St Francis, it has saltbush shrubland and muttonbirds (1816 pairs).

=== Freeling Island ===
Freeling Island is located about 100 metres (330 feet) north-east of Dog Island, it was named after Major-General Sir Arthur Henry Freeling, Surveyor General of South Australia. The island first obtained protected area status as a fauna conservation reserve declared under the Crown Lands Act 1929-1966 on 16 March 1967 . It has muttonbirds (112 pairs).

=== West Island ===
West Island is located in the open ocean about 1.5 kilometres (0.93 miles) west of St Francis, it features exposed granite surfaces and is used by Cape Barren geese. It supports a sea lion breeding colony.

=== Lacy Island ===
Lacy Island is located about 12 kilometres (7.5 miles) north-east of St Francis, it was named by Flinders on 3 February 1802 after Mr Lacy, a crew member of HMS Investigator. It has low heath, shrubland, and supports muttonbirds (4740 pairs).

=== Hart Island ===
Hart Island was named after Captain John Hart, a Premier of South Australia.

=== Evans Island ===
Evans Island is located about between the two protected areas but is part of neither. It serves as a lighthouse reserve managed by the Australian Maritime Safety Authority (AMSA). It features marsh saltbush shrubland on deep soils, and supports muttonbirds (29,472 pairs).

=== St Peter Island ===
St Peter Island (also called St Peter's Island) is located about 13 kilometres (8.1 miles) in length and 3,429 hectares (8,470 acres) in area, is the largest and most accessible island in the archipelago, and holds the greatest number of muttonbirds (334,800 pairs). It lies only 5 kilometres (3.1 miles) from the mainland and was farmed from 1859 until it was added to the conservation park in 1988. Since sheep grazing ceased the vegetation has become dominated by regenerating native plant communities with patches of mallee woodland. It was named in 1627 by Thijssen after Nuyts' patron saint.

=== Gliddon Reef ===
Gliddon Reef is an islet to the south-west of St Peter, it supports a sea lion breeding colony.

=== Purdie Islands ===
Purdie Islands are little more than a chain of low rocks, they were named by Flinders on 3 February 1802 after Robert Purdie, the surgeon’s assistant on the Investigator. They support a sea lion breeding colony.

=== Lounds Island ===
Lounds Island is covered by low, dense vegetation, it was named by Flinders on 7 February 1802 after midshipman Sherrard Lound. It supports a sea lion breeding colony.

=== Goat Island ===
Goat Island is a 303 hectares (750 acres) island lying 2 km south-west of St Peter Island, it supports muttonbirds (94,800 pairs). The wreck of the single-screw steamer, Eleni K (originally Johns Hopkins) lies on the north side of the island.

=== Breakwater Island ===
Breakwater Island is an islet to the south-east of Goat Island, it supports a sea lion breeding colony.

=== Eyre Island ===
Eyre Island is a sand island supporting large numbers of pied oystercatchers, it was named after explorer Edward John Eyre. The island first obtained protected area status as a fauna conservation reserve declared under the Crown Lands Act 1929-1966 on 16 March 1967 .

=== Franklin Islands ===
Franklin Islands – both East and West Franklin Islands are covered by nitre bush on deep soils, with breeding muttonbirds (102,080 pairs). They were named by Flinders on 3 February 1802 after midshipman John Franklin who was later to become well known as a polar explorer. Similar calcarenite-capped plateaus on granite platforms, the islands are joined at low tide by a strip of sand. Once part of the St Francis Island pastoral lease, they were occasionally used for grazing sheep. Public access to the Franklin Islands is prohibited, to safeguard the relict population of stick-nest rats there.

=== Lilliput and Blefescu Islands ===
Lilliput and Blefescu Islands are small islets which were only officially named in 2007, lying off East and West Franklin respectively, they both support sea lion breeding colonies.

== Other animals ==
Tiger snakes and southern carpet pythons occur in the archipelago. Greater stick-nest rats are found on the Franklin Islands. An isolated subspecies of the southern brown bandicoot (Isoodon obesulus nauticus) is endemic to the archipelago and confined to St Francis and the Franklin Islands. An unsuccessful attempt was made to reestablish a colony of brush-tailed bettongs on St Francis Island, where the species had previously become extinct; a similar introduction to St Peter Island has been more successful. The archipelago is important for Australian sea lions; it contains eight breeding colonies as well as several haul-out sites. southern fur seals also use haul-out sites in the archipelago, while southern right whales migrate along the coast from May to October.

== Protected area status and other arrangements ==
=== Statutory reserves ===
The majority of islands within the group are within the Nuyts Archipelago Wilderness Protection Area which was proclaimed on 25 August 2011 and was excised from all of the Isles of St Francis Conservation Park and from the Nuyts Archipelago Conservation with exception to Eyre Island and St Peter Island. Evans Island which was previously unalienated Crown land has only partially included in the wilderness protection area as part of the island is held by AMSA for use as a site for a lighthouse. The waters around the archipelago and adjoining the mainland have been within the 4000 km^{2} Nuyts Archipelago Marine Park since 2012.

=== Non-statutory arrangements ===
==== Important Bird Area ====
The archipelago, with the exception of Hart Island, has been identified by BirdLife International as a 110 km^{2} Important Bird Area (IBA) because it contains over 1% of the world populations of short-tailed shearwaters (with an estimated maximum of 890,740 breeding pairs), white-faced storm-petrels (22,750 breeding pairs) and pied oystercatchers (about 250 individuals). Other birds nesting in the IBA include little penguins (over 1000 pairs), Pacific gulls (about eight pairs), Caspian terns (about 250 pairs) and crested terns (at least 3000 pairs), as well as eastern reef egrets, ospreys, white-bellied sea eagles and hooded plovers. Rock parrots occur on Lounds Island and probably Smooth Island.

== See also ==
- List of archipelagos
- Murat Commonwealth Marine Reserve
