= Nuyts Archipelago Wilderness Protection Area =

Protected area in South Australia

- IUCN category Ib (wilderness area)
- Location within South Australia
- Location: South Australia
- Nearest city: Ceduna
- Coordinates: 32°30′33″S 133°17′29″E
- Area: 24.62 km^{2} (9.51 sq mi)
- Established: 25 August 2011
- Governing body: Department for Environment and Water

Nuyts Archipelago Wilderness Protection Area is a protected area in the Australian state of South Australia located in the Nuyts Archipelago off the west coast of Eyre Peninsula within 10 kilometres (6.2 miles) to 75 kilometres (47 miles) south-west of Ceduna.

The wilderness protection area consists of land on Blefuscu Island, Dog Island, Egg Island, part of Evans Island, Franklin Islands, Freeling Island, Fenelon Island, Goat Island, Hart Island, Lacy Islands, Lilliput Island, Lound Island, Masillon Island, Purdie Islands, Smooth Island, St Francis Island and West Island.

The wilderness protection area was proclaimed on 25 August 2011 under the Wilderness Protection Act 1992 to protect "important island habitat for species such as the stick-nest rat and brush-tailed bettongs (which are part of re-introduction programs) and species such as the carpet python and short-nosed bandicoot" and habitat for "other notable species", including the Australian sea lion and mutton birds. It was created on land excised from all of the Isles of St Francis Conservation Park and part of the Nuyts Archipelago Conservation Park, and land on Evans Island previously classed as unalienated Crown land with exception of a portion held by Australian Maritime Safety Authority for "lighthouse purposes". The waters surrounding all of the islands in the wilderness protection area have been located within the Nuyts Archipelago Marine Park since 2012.

The wilderness protection area is classified as an IUCN Category Ib protected area.

== See also ==
- Protected areas of South Australia
