= Smooth Island (South Australia) =

Island in South Australia

- Location within South Australia

Geography
- Location: Great Australian Bight
- Coordinates: 32°29′08″S 133°18′33″E
- Highest elevation: 35 m (115 ft)

Administration
- Australia

Demographics
- Population: 0

Smooth Island is an island in the Australian state of South Australia located off the west coast of Eyre Peninsula about 52 kilometres (32 miles) south west of the town of Ceduna. It is both part of a local group of islands known as the Isles of St Francis group and a larger group known as the Nuyts Archipelago. It has enjoyed protected area status since the 1960s and since 2011, it has been part of the Nuyts Archipelago Wilderness Protection Area.

== Description ==
Smooth Island is an island located within the Isles of St Francis group, which itself is part of the Nuyts Archipelago. It is located about 52 kilometres (32 miles) south west of the town of Ceduna on the west coast of Eyre Peninsula in South Australia. Several sources states that the island is located about 200 metres (660 feet) north of St Francis Island while the National Geospatial-Intelligence Agency and charts published by the Government of South Australia respectively state and show that the island is located "almost one nautical mile (1.9 km) N of the NE extremity of St. Francis Island".

The island is predominantly dome shaped with a summit at a height of 35 metres (115 feet) with steep sides rising from the surrounding waters. The island is described as having a "teardrop" plan with its long axis oriented in a south easterly direction with overall length of about 500 metres (1,600 feet) and a width of 300 metres (980 feet).

The island is considered to be difficult to access via watercraft in "normal conditions" on the basis of "impressions from a brief flyover" in a helicopter during 1982.

== Formation, geology and oceanography ==
Smooth Island was formed about 7700 years ago when sea levels rose at the start of the Holocene. The island's geology consists of a "granite base and thin calcarenite mantle" that is "likely to be fragmented into jagged rocks and shingles, with a sandy, skeletal soil filling depressions" in areas that are "beyond the reach of storm waves". The island's steep sides drop into water of depth equal or greater than 20 metres (66 feet).

== History ==
=== European discovery and use ===
Smooth Island is reported as being named by Matthew Flinders in 1802 and was so named because of the "island's shape". The Baudin expedition to Australia named the island as Ile Malesherbes later in 1802.

== Flora and fauna ==
=== Flora ===
As of 1996, the literature suggests that no onsite flora survey had been carried out and accordingly, contains the following description based on an extrapolation of observations carried out on nearby Egg Island. Saltbush and nitre-bush should be present where soil pockets exist in the calcarenite capping while an open heath of twiggy daisy-bush should be present over the central part of the island.

==== Sub tidal flora ====
A survey carried out in 2002 found that kelp from the genus Ecklonia was the dominant plant cover on reef substrate at a depth of 22 metres (72 feet) while a community of Cystophora and Sargassum species were dominant on reef substrate at a depth of 5 metres (16 feet).

=== Fauna ===
As of 1996, the literature suggests that no onsite fauna survey had been carried out as the following list is an extrapolation of species present on nearby Egg Island. Seabird species are likely to be represented by sooty oystercatcher, crested tern and pacific gull as well as visitors such as white-bellied sea-eagle. Land bird species that are likely to visit the island are the rock parrot and the richard's pipit. Reptilian species are likely to include the marbled gecko, the four-toed earless skink and the bull skink.

== Protected area status ==
Smooth Island first received protected area status as a fauna reserve declared under the Fauna Conservation Act 1964 and then as a fauna conservation reserve declared under the Crown Lands Act 1929-1966 on 16 March 1967. In 1972, it became part of the Isles of St Francis Conservation Park, which was declared under the National Parks and Wildlife Act 1972 to "conserve island populations and habitat for endangered species". On 25 August 2011, it and the rest of the Isles of St Francis Conservation Park was transferred to the newly created Nuyts Archipelago Wilderness Protection Area. As of 2012, the waters adjoining Smooth Island are part of a sanctuary zone within the Nuyts Archipelago Marine Park.

== See also ==
- List of islands of Australia

== Citations and references ==
=== References ===
- Baker, J. L. (2004), Towards a System of Ecologically Representative Marine Protected Areas in South Australian Marine Bioregions - Technical Report (Part 2) (PDF), Dept. for Environment and Heritage
- Kelton, Greg (31 October 2009). "West Coast island protection areas". The Advertiser.
- Robinson, A. C.; Canty, P.; Mooney, T.; Rudduck, P. (1996). South Australia's offshore islands (PDF). Australian Heritage Commission. ISBN 978-0-644-35011-2.
- South Australia. Department of Marine and Harbors (DMH) (1985), The Waters of South Australia a series of charts, sailing notes and coastal photographs, Dept. of Marine and Harbors, South Australia, ISBN 978-0-7243-7603-2
- South Australia. Department for Environment and Heritage (DEH) (2006), Management plan : island parks of western Eyre Peninsula (PDF), Dept. for Environment and Heritage, ISBN 978-1-921238-18-5
- "Nuyts Archipelago Marine Park Management Plan 2012" (PDF). Department of Environment, Water and Natural Resources (DEWNR). 2012.
- "Wilderness Advisory Committee Annual Report 2012-13" (PDF). Annual Report. Government of South Australia (GSA). September 2013. ISSN 1832-9357.
