= Peter Copley (ecologist) =

Australian ecologist

Peter Bruce Copley is an ecologist based in South Australia. He has worked in threatened species and ecological community recovery planning since the 1990s. Copley has had leadership and foundational roles in key projects in South Australia including Arid Recovery (near Roxby Downs) and the Bouceback program which focused on the recovery of the Yellow-footed rock wallaby, and has overseen the Greater stick-nest rat recovery project. Copley currently works for the Department of Environment, Water and Natural Resources for the Government of South Australia. Copley was awarded a Public Service Medal in 2019 "for outstanding public service to conservation and the environment, and to biodiversity research and policy development, in South Australia."
