= European exploration of Australia =

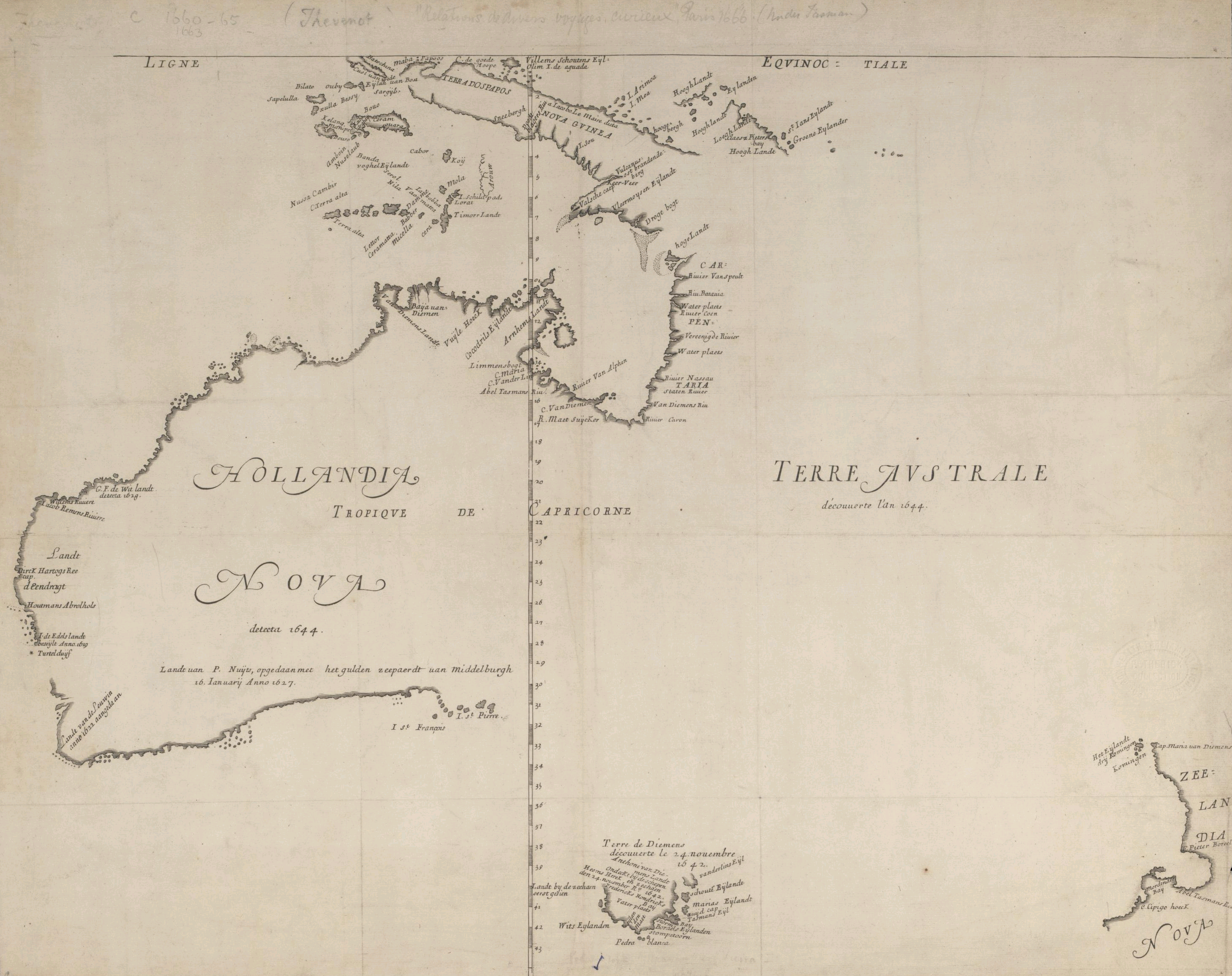
Melchisédech Thévenot (1620?–1692): map of New Holland 1664, based on a map by the Dutch cartographer Joan Blaeu. This is a typical map from the Golden Age of Dutch cartography. Australasia during the Golden Age of Dutch exploration and discovery (c. 1590s–1720s): including Nova Guinea (New Guinea), Nova Hollandia (mainland Australia), Van Diemen's Land (Tasmania), and Nova Zeelandia (New Zealand).

The European exploration of Australia first began in February 1606, when Dutch navigator Willem Janszoon landed in Cape York Peninsula and on October that year when Spanish explorer Luís Vaz de Torres sailed through, and navigated, Torres Strait islands. Twenty-nine other Dutch navigators explored the western and southern coasts in the 17th century, and dubbed the continent New Holland. Most of the explorers of this period concluded that the apparent lack of water and fertile soil made the region unsuitable for colonisation.

Other European explorers followed until, in 1770, Lieutenant James Cook charted the east coast of Australia for Great Britain. Later, after Cook's death, Joseph Banks recommended sending convicts to Botany Bay (now in Sydney), New South Wales. A First Fleet of British ships arrived at Botany Bay in January 1788 to establish a penal colony, the first colony on the Australian mainland. In the century that followed, the British established other colonies on the continent, and European explorers ventured into its interior.

== Earliest European explorations ==
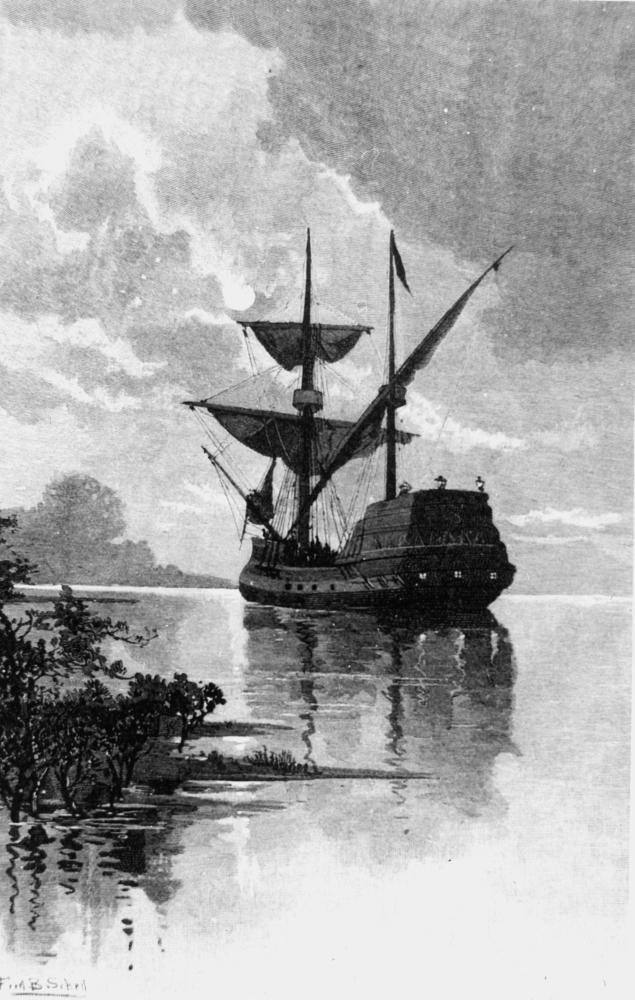
19th-century artist impression of the ship Duyfken in the Gulf of Carpentaria

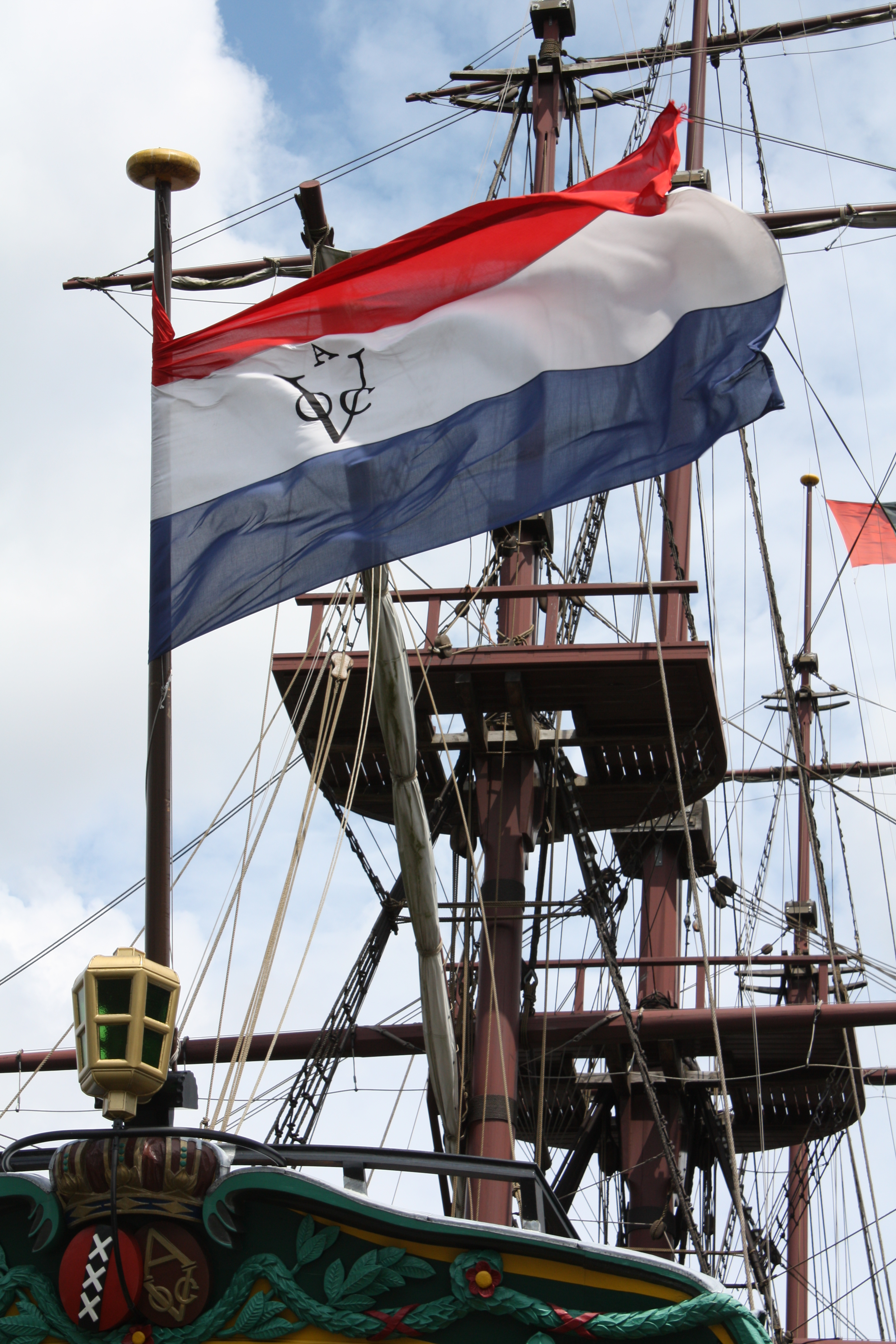
Replica of an East Indiaman of the Dutch East India Company/United East India Company (VOC)

Although a theory of Portuguese discovery in the 1520s exists, it lacks definitive evidence. In 1606, Dutch explorers made the first recorded European sightings of, and first recorded landfalls on, the Australian mainland. The first ship and crew to chart the Australian coast and meet with Aboriginal people was the Duyfken captained by Dutch navigator, Willem Janszoon. He sighted the coast of Cape York Peninsula in early 1606, and made landfall on 26 February at the Pennefather River near the modern town of Weipa on Cape York. The Dutch charted the whole of the western and northern coastlines and named the island continent "New Holland" during the 17th century, but made no attempt at settlement. William Dampier, an English explorer and privateer, landed on the north-west coast of New Holland in 1688, and again in 1699 on a return trip.

The Dutch, following shipping routes to the Dutch East Indies to trade in spices, china and silk, proceeded to contribute a great deal to Europe's knowledge of Australia's coast. In 1616, Dirk Hartog, sailing off course, en route from the Cape of Good Hope to Batavia, landed on an island off Shark Bay, West Australia. In 1622–23 the Leeuwin made the first recorded rounding of the south west corner of the continent, and gave her name to Cape Leeuwin.

In 1627 the south coast of Australia was accidentally encountered by François Thijssen and named 't Land van Pieter Nuyts, in honour of the highest ranking passenger, Pieter Nuyts, extraordinary Councillor of India. In 1628 a squadron of Dutch ships was sent by the Governor-General of the Dutch East Indies Pieter de Carpentier to explore the northern coast. These ships made extensive examinations, particularly in the Gulf of Carpentaria, named in honour of de Carpentier.

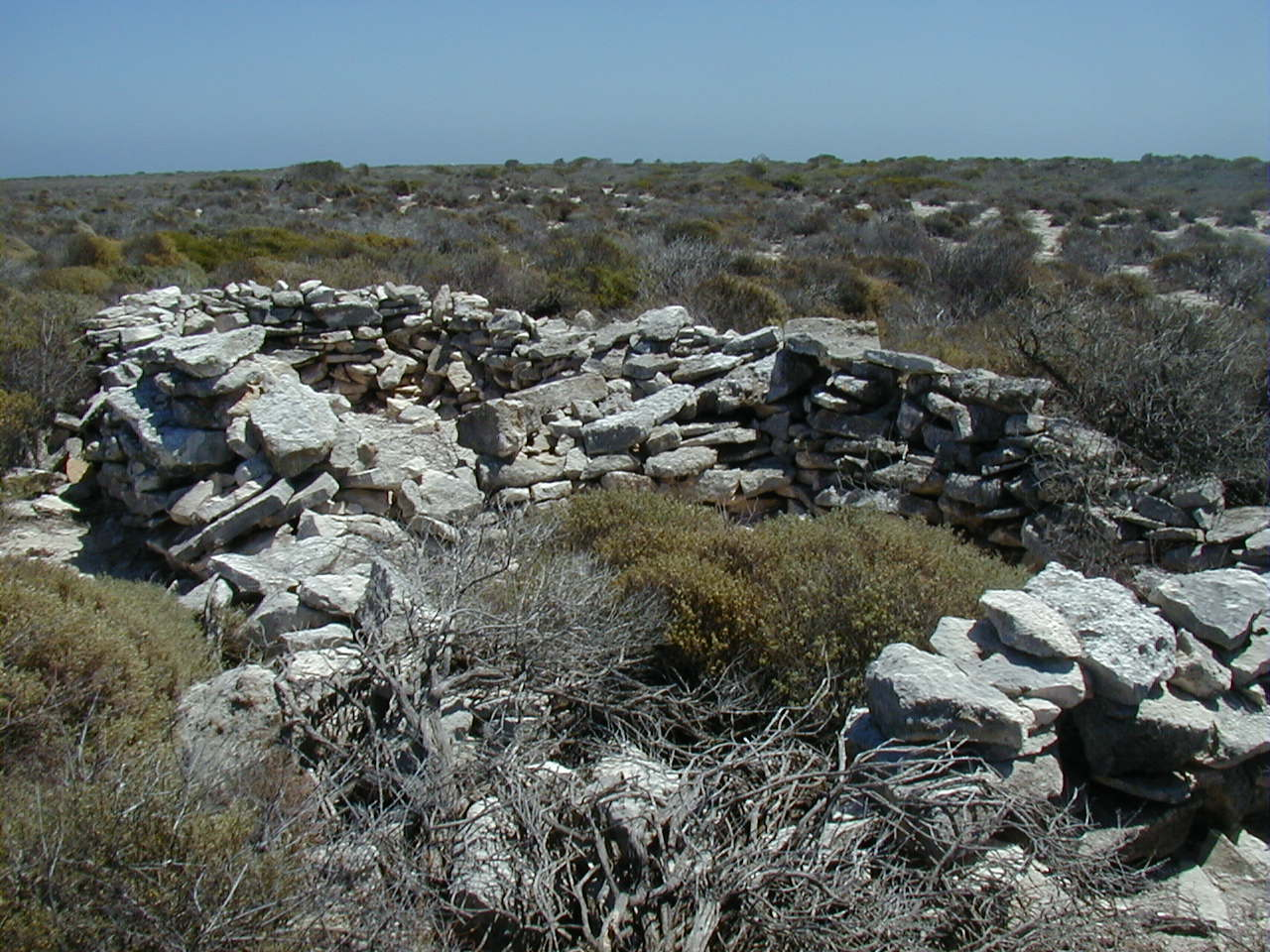
The Wiebbe Hayes Stone Fort on West Wallabi Island is the first known European structure to be built in Australia.

Abel Tasman's voyage of 1642 was the first known European expedition to reach Van Diemen's Land (later Tasmania) and New Zealand, and to sight Fiji. On his second voyage of 1644, he also contributed significantly to the mapping of Australia proper, making observations on the land and people of the north coast below New Guinea.

A map of the world inlaid into the floor of the Burgerzaal ("Burger's Hall") of the new Amsterdam Stadhuis ("Town Hall") in 1655 revealed the extent of Dutch charts of much of Australia's coast. Based on the 1648 map by Joan Blaeu, Nova et Accuratissima Terrarum Orbis Tabula, it incorporated Tasman's discoveries, subsequently reproduced in the map, Archipelagus Orientalis sive Asiaticus published in the Kurfürsten Atlas (Atlas of the Great Elector).

In 1664 the French geographer Melchisédech Thévenot published a map of New Holland in Relations de Divers Voyages Curieux. Thévenot divided the continent in two, between Nova Hollandia to the west and Terre Australe to the east. Emanuel Bowen reproduced Thevenot's map in his Complete System of Geography (London, 1747), re-titling it A Complete Map of the Southern Continent and adding three inscriptions promoting the benefits of exploring and colonising the country. One inscription said:

It is impossible to conceive a Country that promises fairer from its Situation than this of TERRA AUSTRALIS, no longer incognita, as this Map demonstrates, but the Southern Continent Discovered. It lies precisely in the richest climates of the World... and therefore whoever perfectly discovers and settles it will become infalliably possessed of Territories as Rich, as fruitful, and as capable of Improvement, as any that have hitherto been found out, either in the East Indies or the West.

In 1770, James Cook sailed along and mapped the east coast, which he named New South Wales and claimed for Great Britain.

== Colonisation ==
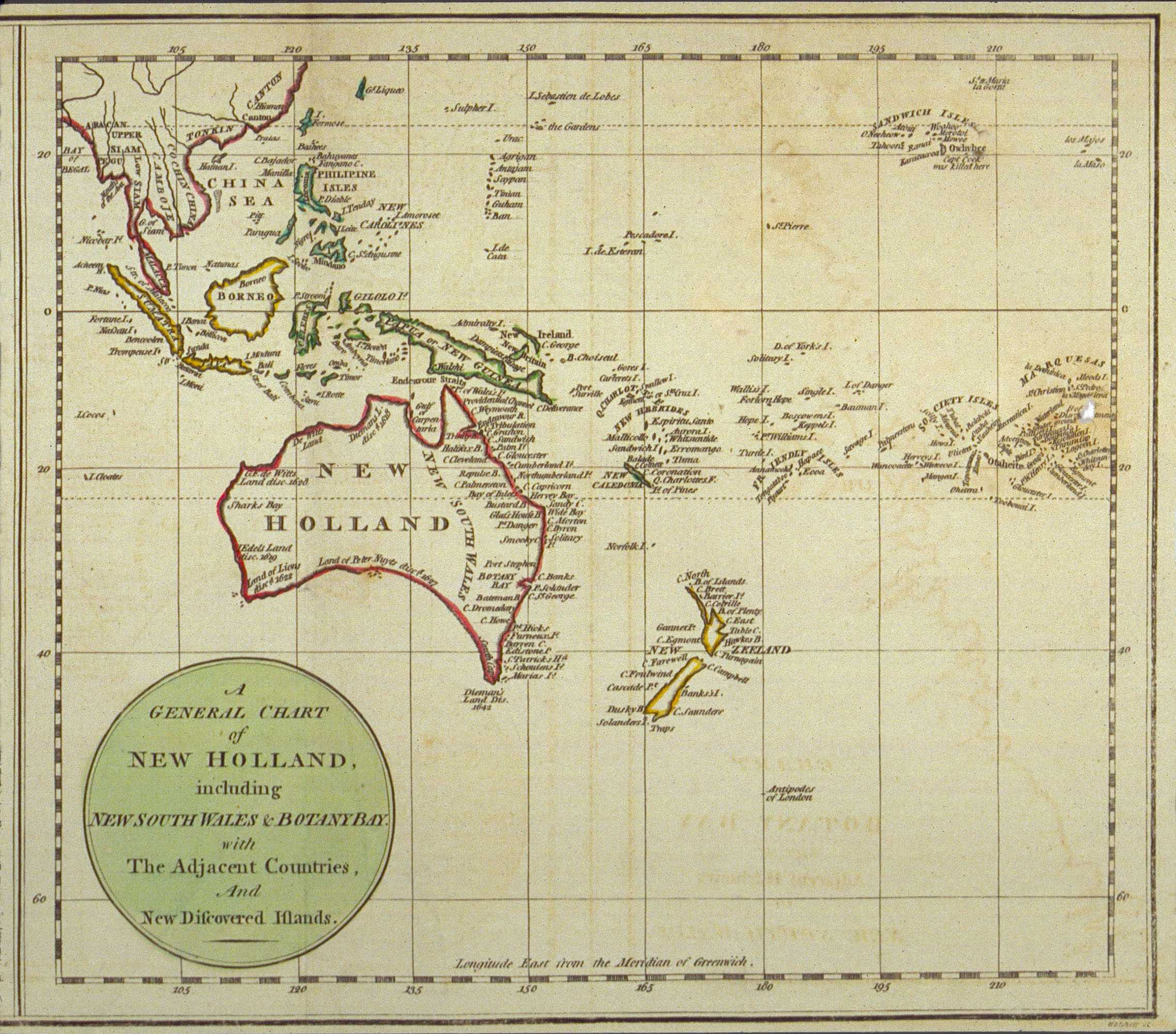
A General Chart of New Holland including New South Wales & Botany Bay with The Adjacent Countries and New Discovered Lands, published in An Historical Narrative of the Discovery of New Holland and New South Wales, London, Fielding and Stockdale, November 1786

With the loss of its American colonies in 1783, the British Government sent a fleet of ships, the "First Fleet", under the command of Captain Arthur Phillip, to establish a new penal colony in New South Wales. A camp was set up and the flag raised at Sydney Cove, Port Jackson, on 26 January 1788, a date which became Australia's national day, Australia Day. Phillip sent exploratory missions in search of better soils, fixed on the Parramatta region as a promising area for expansion, and moved many of the convicts from late 1788 to establish a small township, which became the main centre of the colony's economic life.

Seventeen years after Cook's landfall on the east coast of Australia, the British government decided to establish a colony at Botany Bay. Following the American Revolutionary War (1775–1783), Britain lost most of its territory in North America and considered establishing replacement colonies. In 1779 Sir Joseph Banks, the eminent scientist who had accompanied James Cook on his 1770 voyage, recommended Botany Bay as a suitable site for settlement, saying that "it was not to be doubted that a Tract of Land such as New Holland, which was larger than the whole of Europe, would furnish Matter of advantageous Return".

Georg Forster, who had sailed under Lieutenant James Cook in the voyage of HMS Resolution (1772–1775), wrote in 1786 on the future prospects of the British colony: "New Holland, an island of enormous extent or it might be said, a third continent, is the future homeland of a new civilized society which, however mean its beginning may seem to be, nevertheless promises within a short time to become very important."

Britain claimed territory encompassing all of Australia eastward of the meridian of 135° East and all the islands in the Pacific Ocean between the latitudes of Cape York and the southern tip of Van Diemen's Land (Tasmania). The western limit of 135° East was set at the meridian dividing New Holland from Terra Australis, as shown on Emanuel Bowen's Complete Map of the Southern Continent, published in John Campbell's editions of John Harris' Navigantium atque Itinerantium Bibliotheca, or Voyages and Travels (1744–1748, and 1764). It was a vast claim which elicited excitement at the time: the Dutch translator of First Fleet officer and author Watkin Tench's A Narrative of the Expedition to Botany Bay wrote: "a single province which, beyond all doubt, is the largest on the whole surface of the earth. From their definition it covers, in its greatest extent from East to West, virtually a fourth of the whole circumference of the Globe."

A British settlement was established in 1803 in Van Diemen's Land, now known as Tasmania, and it became a separate colony in 1825. The United Kingdom formally claimed the western part of Western Australia (the Swan River Colony) in 1828. Separate colonies were carved from parts of New South Wales: South Australia in 1836, Victoria in 1851, and Queensland in 1859. The Northern Territory was founded in 1911 when it was excised from South Australia. South Australia was founded as a "free province"—it was never a penal colony. Victoria and Western Australia were also founded "free", but later accepted transported convicts. A campaign by the settlers of New South Wales led to the end of convict transportation to that colony; the last convict ship arrived in 1848.

== Exploration of the continent ==
=== Early days ===
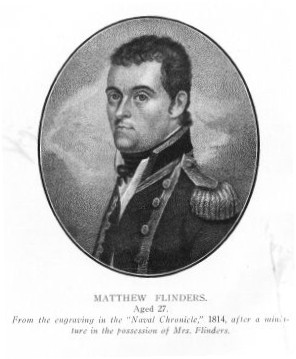
Matthew Flinders led the first successful circumnavigation of Australia.

In 1798–99 George Bass and Matthew Flinders set out from Sydney in a sloop and circumnavigated Tasmania, thus proving it to be an island, following a failed attempt to settle at Sullivan Bay in what is now Victoria. In 1801–02 Matthew Flinders in HMS Investigator led the first circumnavigation of Australia. Aboard ship was the Aboriginal explorer Bungaree, of the Sydney district, who became the first person born on the Australian continent to circumnavigate the Australian continent. Previously, the famous Bennelong and a companion had become the first people born in the area of New South Wales to sail for Europe, when, in 1792 they accompanied Governor Phillip to England and were presented to King George III.

In 1813, Gregory Blaxland, William Lawson and William Wentworth succeeded in crossing the formidable barrier of forested gulleys and sheer cliffs presented by the Blue Mountains, west of Sydney. At Mount Blaxland they looked out over "enough grass to support the stock of the colony for thirty years", and expansion of the British settlement into the interior could begin.

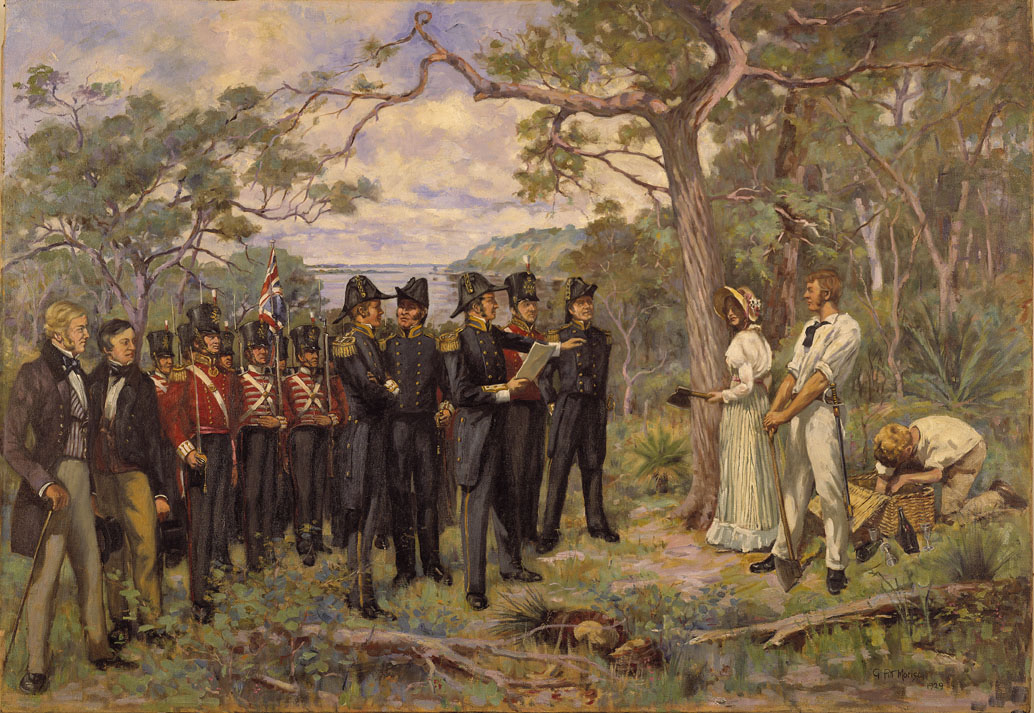
The Foundation of Perth 1829 by George Pitt Morison

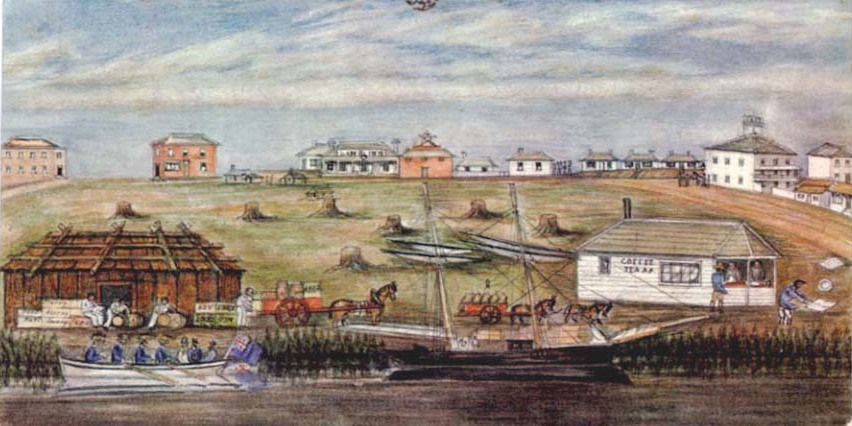
Melbourne Landing, 1840; watercolour by W. Liardet (1840)

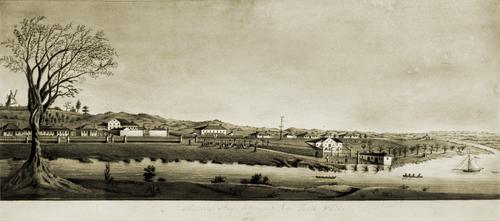
Brisbane (Moreton Bay Settlement), 1835; watercolour by H. Bowerman

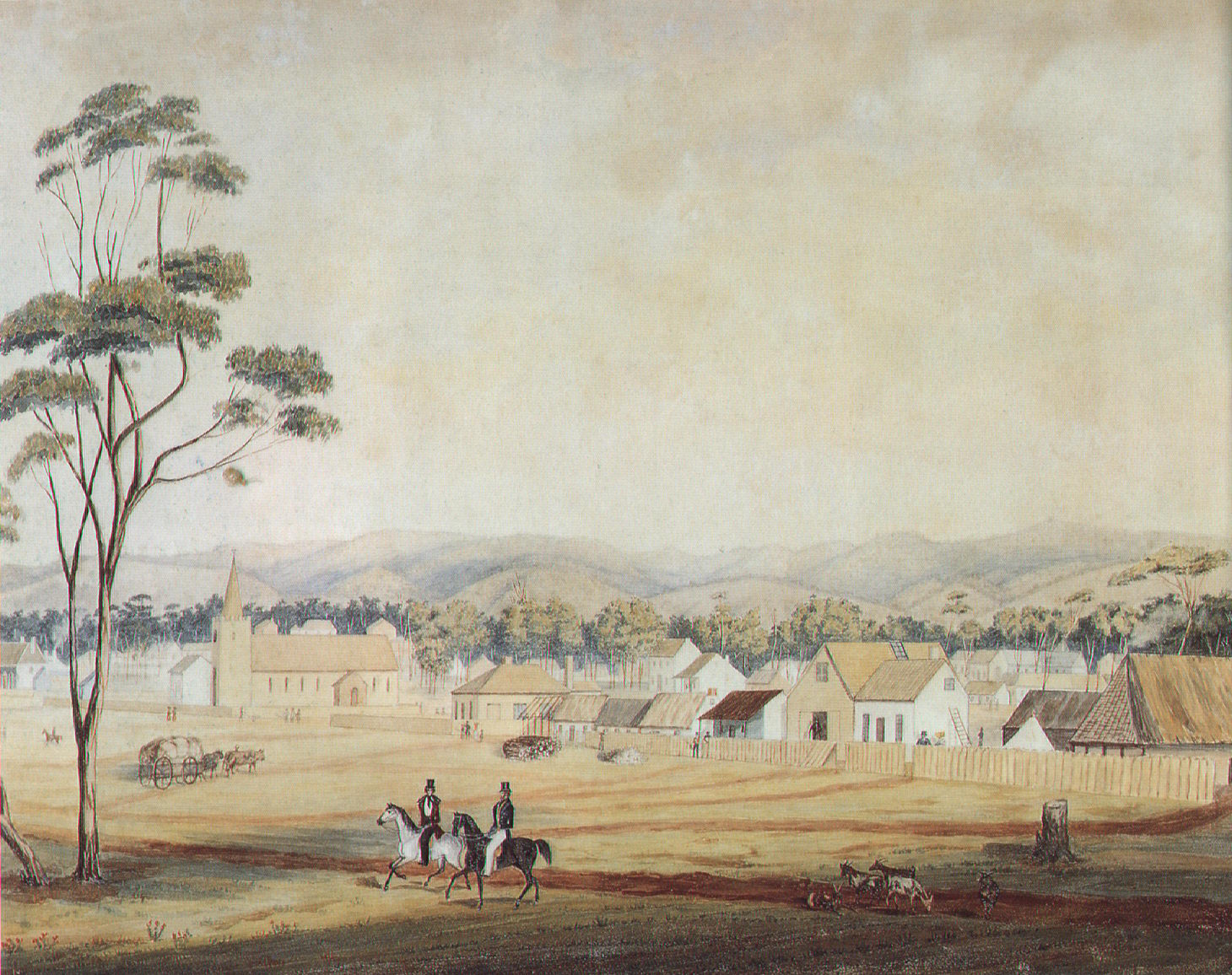
Adelaide in 1839. South Australia was founded as a free colony, without convicts.

=== 1820s–1830s ===
In 1824 the Governor Sir Thomas Brisbane commissioned Hamilton Hume and former Royal Navy Captain William Hovell to lead an expedition to find new grazing land in the south of the colony, and also to find an answer to the mystery of where New South Wales' western rivers flowed. Over 16 weeks in 1824–25, Hume and Hovell journeyed to Port Phillip and back. They made many important discoveries including the Murray River (which they named the Hume), many of its tributaries, and good agricultural and grazing lands between Gunning, New South Wales and Corio Bay, Port Phillip.

Charles Sturt led an expedition along the Macquarie River in 1828, becoming the first European to encounter the Darling River. A theory had developed that the inland rivers of New South Wales were draining into an inland sea. Leading a second expedition in 1829, Sturt followed the Murrumbidgee River into a 'broad and noble river', the Murray River, which he named after Sir George Murray, secretary of state for the colonies. His party followed this river to its junction with the Darling River, facing two threatening encounters with local Aboriginal people along the way. Sturt continued down river to Lake Alexandrina, where the Murray meets the sea in South Australia. Suffering greatly, the party had to row hundreds of kilometres back upstream for the return journey.

Surveyor General Sir Thomas Mitchell conducted a series of expeditions from the 1830s to 'fill in the gaps' left by these previous expeditions. In this work, he depended on Indigenous guides and interpreters, such Turandurey and Yuranigh. With that collaboration, history records Mitchell as meticulous in seeking to record the original Aboriginal place names around the colony, for which reason the majority of place names to this day retain their Aboriginal titles. These include several rivers, such as the Avoca River, Belyando River, and the Cogoon River.

In 1836, two ships of the South Australia Land Company left to establish the first settlement on Kangaroo Island. The foundation of South Australia is now generally commemorated as Governor John Hindmarsh's Proclamation of the new Province at Glenelg, on the mainland, on 28 December 1836.

The Polish scientist/explorer Count Paul Edmund Strzelecki conducted surveying work in the Australian Alps in 1839. He became the first European to ascend Australia's highest peak, which he named Mount Kosciuszko in honour of the Polish patriot Tadeusz Kościuszko.

Other British settlements followed, at various points around the continent, many of them unsuccessful. The East India Trade Committee recommended in 1823 that a settlement be established on the coast of northern Australia to forestall the Dutch, and Captain J.J.G. Bremer, RN, was commissioned to form a settlement between Bathurst Island and the Cobourg Peninsula. Bremer fixed the site of his settlement at Fort Dundas on Melville Island in 1824. Because this was well to the west of the boundary proclaimed in 1788, he proclaimed British sovereignty over all the territory as far west as longitude 129° East.

The new boundary included Melville and Bathurst islands, and the adjacent mainland. In 1826, the British claim was extended to the whole Australian continent when Major Edmund Lockyer established a settlement on King George Sound (the basis of the later town of Albany), but the eastern border of Western Australia remained unchanged at longitude 129° East. In 1824, a penal colony was established near the mouth of the Brisbane River (the basis of the later colony of Queensland). In 1829, the Swan River Colony and its capital of Perth were founded on the west coast proper and also assumed control of King George Sound. Initially a free colony, Western Australia later accepted British convicts, because of suffering a lack of settlers and an acute labour shortage.

The colony of South Australia was settled in 1836, with its western and eastern boundaries set at 132° and 141° East of Greenwich, and to the north at latitude 26° South. The western and eastern boundary points were chosen as they marked the extent of coastline first surveyed by Matthew Flinders in 1802 (Nicolas Baudin's priority being ignored). The British Parliament set the northern boundary at the parallel of latitude 26° South, because they believed that was the limit of effective control of territory that could be exercised by a settlement founded on the shores of Gulf St Vincent. The South Australian Company had proposed the parallel of 20° South, later reduced to the Tropic of Capricorn (the parallel of latitude 23° 37′ South).

=== Into the interior ===
European explorers made their last great, often arduous and sometimes tragic expeditions into the interior of Australia during the second half of the 19th century—some with the official sponsorship of the colonial authorities and others commissioned by private investors. By 1850, large areas of the inland were still unknown to Europeans. Trailblazers like Edmund Kennedy and the Prussian naturalist Ludwig Leichhardt had met tragic ends attempting to fill in the gaps during the 1840s, but explorers remained ambitious to discover new lands for agriculture or answer scientific enquiries. Surveyors also acted as explorers and the colonies sent out expeditions to discover the best routes for lines of communication. The size of expeditions varied considerably from small parties of just two or three to large, well-equipped teams led by gentlemen explorers assisted by smiths, carpenters, labourers and Aboriginal guides accompanied by horses, camels or bullocks.

From 1858 onwards, the so-called "Afghan" cameleers and their beasts played an instrumental role in opening up the outback and helping to build infrastructure.

In 1860, the ill-fated Burke and Wills led the first north–south crossing of the continent from Melbourne to the Gulf of Carpentaria. Lacking bushcraft and unwilling to learn from the local Aboriginal people, Burke and Wills died in 1861, having returned from the Gulf to their rendezvous point at Coopers Creek only to discover the rest of their party had departed the location only a matter of hours previously. Though an impressive feat of navigation, the expedition was an organisational disaster which continues to fascinate the Australian public.

In 1862, John McDouall Stuart succeeded in traversing Central Australia from south to north. His expedition mapped out the route which was later followed by the Australian Overland Telegraph Line.

Uluru and Kata Tjuta were first mapped by Europeans in 1872 during the expeditionary period made possible by the construction of the Australian Overland Telegraph Line. In separate expeditions, Ernest Giles and William Gosse were the first European explorers to this area. While exploring the area in 1872, Giles sighted Kata Tjuta from a location near Kings Canyon and called it Mount Olga, while the following year Gosse observed Uluru and named it Ayers Rock, in honour of the Chief Secretary of South Australia, Sir Henry Ayers. These barren desert lands of Central Australia disappointed the Europeans as unpromising for pastoral expansion, but would later come to be appreciated as emblematic of Australia.

== Sources ==
- Davison, Graeme; Hirst, John; Macintyre, Stuart (1998). The Oxford Companion to Australian History. Melbourne: Oxford University Press. ISBN 978-0-19-553597-6.
- McGillivray, Mary (5 August 2025). "European cartographers' inaccurate maps of Australia have plenty to teach us". ABC News.
