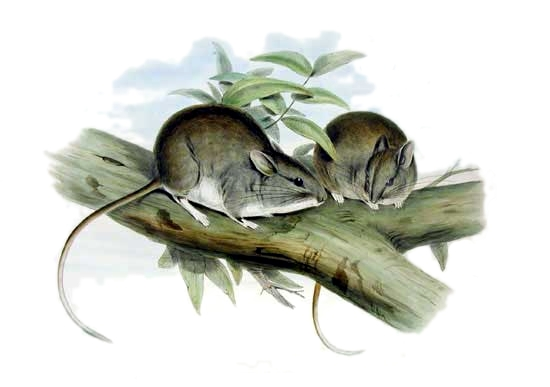

Conservation status
- Extinct (1933) (IUCN 3.1)

Scientific classification
- Kingdom: Animalia
- Phylum: Chordata
- Class: Mammalia
- Order: Rodentia
- Family: Muridae
- Genus: Leporillus
- Species: †L. apicalis

Binomial name
- †Leporillus apicalis (Gould, 1854)

Synonyms
- Hapalotis apicalis Gould.

= Lesser stick-nest rat =

Species of mammal

The lesser stick-nest rat or white-tipped stick-nest rat (Leporillus apicalis) is an extinct species of rodent in the family Muridae. It lived in central Australia where it built nests of sticks that accumulate over years and can become very large. The last confirmed sighting of this rat was in 1933 although there is a credible report of a sighting in 1970. In 2008, the International Union for Conservation of Nature listed it as "critically endangered", suggesting that it may yet survive in remote areas of unsurveyed territory, but revised its evaluation to "extinct" again in 2016, based on an assessment in 2012. Its close relative, the greater stick-nest rat, survives on some offshore islands and in fenced sanctuaries.

== Behaviour ==
It accumulated large mounds of sticks to construct its nests, which were up to three metres long and a metre high. It was easily tamed, sometimes climbing onto tables to get sugar. It was also eaten by people. The last capture was filmed on 18 July 1933, when the stick-nests were set alight. The specimens are held in the South Australian Museum. The rat may have declined from competition with cattle and sheep. The reduction in available food sources also caused them to be more vulnerable to predators like owls. There is a possibility that a lesser stick-nest rat was seen in a cave in Western Australia in 1970.

The last specimen was found at Mount Crombie.

Gerard Krefft in 1862 wrote that he encountered the species in Euston, Bourke, and on both sides of the Murray and on the Darling. He could dislodge up to 15 individuals from a single tree and kept a large number of them in captivity. They were tame enough that any that escaped came back to join him for supper, "and help[ed] themselves, to damper especially". On a similar note, he also wrote that they themselves had "flesh white, tender, and well-tasted". Krefft tried to keep lesser-stick nest rats in a box with greater-stick nest rats but found that they kept fighting and that the former always remained victorious.

== Conservation status assessment ==
The 2008 release of the updated IUCN status for the lesser stick-nest rat downgraded the conservation status from extinct to critically endangered (possibly extinct), owing to the very slight possibility that a very small population may still exist in yet to be surveyed remote lands of the Australian interior. This was based on a reliable record from 1970, continued occasional reports of fresh vegetation being added to old stick-nests, and much of this species' range being in remote portions of central Australia which have not yet been fully surveyed. However, the classification was revised to "extinct" again in 2016.

== See also ==
- Leporillus
- Greater stick-nest rat
- Rodents of Australia
- List of Australia-New Guinea species extinct in the Holocene

== External sources ==
- Flannery, Tim; Schouten, Peter (2001). A Gap in Nature: Discovering the World's Extinct Animals. Atlantic Monthly Press, New York. ISBN 978-0-87113-797-5.
