= Nuyts Archipelago Conservation Park =

Protected area in South Australia

- IUCN category Ia (strict nature reserve)
- Location within South Australia
- Location: South Australia
- Nearest city: Ceduna
- Coordinates: 32°16′44″S 133°34′57″E
- Area: 88.62 km^{2} (34.22 sq mi)
- Established: 16 March 1967
- Governing body: Department for Environment and Water

Nuyts Archipelago Conservation Park is a protected area in the Australian state of South Australia located on Eyre Island and St Peter Island in the Nuyts Archipelago located off the west coast of Eyre Peninsula about 10 kilometres (6.2 miles) south and 25 kilometres (16 miles) south-east respectively of Ceduna.

The land first received protected area status as a fauna conservation reserves proclaimed on 16 March 1967 under the Crown Lands Act 1929 in respect to Eyre Island. Additional fauna conservation reserves were proclaimed on 4 November 1967 in respect to the Franklin Islands, Goat Island, Lacy Islands, Lound Island and Purdie Island. On 27 April 1972, all of the land proclaimed as fauna conservation reserves was reconstituted as the Nuyts Archipelago Conservation Park under the National Parks and Wildlife Act 1972. On 14 January 1988, St Peter Island was added to the conservation park. On 19 December 1991, additional land was added to the conservation park to extend protection over land located between high tide and low tide. On 4 November 1993, an islet located off the western end of Eyre Island was added. On 25 August 2011, all of the conservation park with the exception of Eyre Island and St Peter Island was constituted as part of the Nuyts Archipelago Wilderness Protection Area and therefore is no longer part of the conservation park. The waters surrounding both Eyre Island and St Peter Island have been located within the Nuyts Archipelago Marine Park since 2012.

The conservation park is classified as an IUCN Category Ia protected area. In 1980, it was listed on the now-defunct Register of the National Estate.

== See also ==
- Protected areas of South Australia
- Isles of St Francis Conservation Park
