= Murat Marine Park =

Protected area in Australia

- IUCN category II (national park)
- Interactive map of Murat Marine Park
- Location: Australia
- Nearest city: Fowlers Bay
- Coordinates: 32°31′0.12″S 132°39′00″E
- Area: 937.77 km^{2} (362.08 sq mi)
- Established: 8 December 2012
- Governing body: Director of National Parks
- Website: Official website

Murat Marine Park (formerly Murat Commonwealth Marine Reserve) is a marine protected area located in the Great Australian Bight south of South Australia in waters within the Australian Exclusive economic zone to the west of the island group known as the Nuyts Archipelago and ranging in depth from 15 metres (49 feet) to 70 metres (230 feet).

It was gazetted in November 2012. It was renamed on 11 October 2017.

The marine park includes ecosystems representative of a feature known as the "Great Australian Bight Shelf Transition", two "key ecological features" being "benthic invertebrate communities’’ and "areas important for small pelagic fish", and the feeding areas for the following species - Australian sea lion, great white shark, short-tailed shearwater and Caspian tern. It also provides protection for a submerged reef system known as "Yatala Reef".

It is part of a group of Australian marine parks known as the South-west Marine Parks Network.

The marine park is classified as an IUCN Category II protected area.

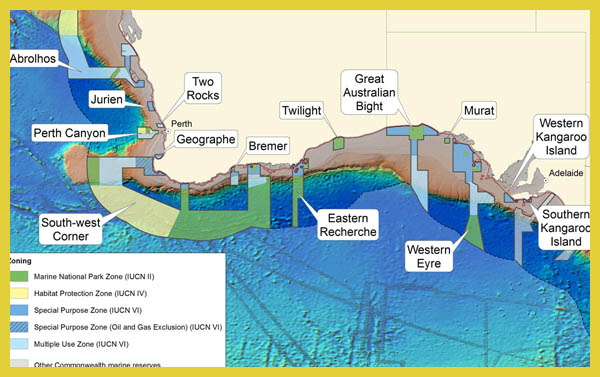
The South-west Marine Parks Network, including the Murat Marine Park

== See also ==
- Protected areas managed by the Australian government
