= Gulden Zeepaert =

Dutch East India Company ship

History

Netherlands
- Name: Gulden Zeepaert
- Owner: Dutch East India Company
- Launched: Before 1626
- Fate: Scrapped

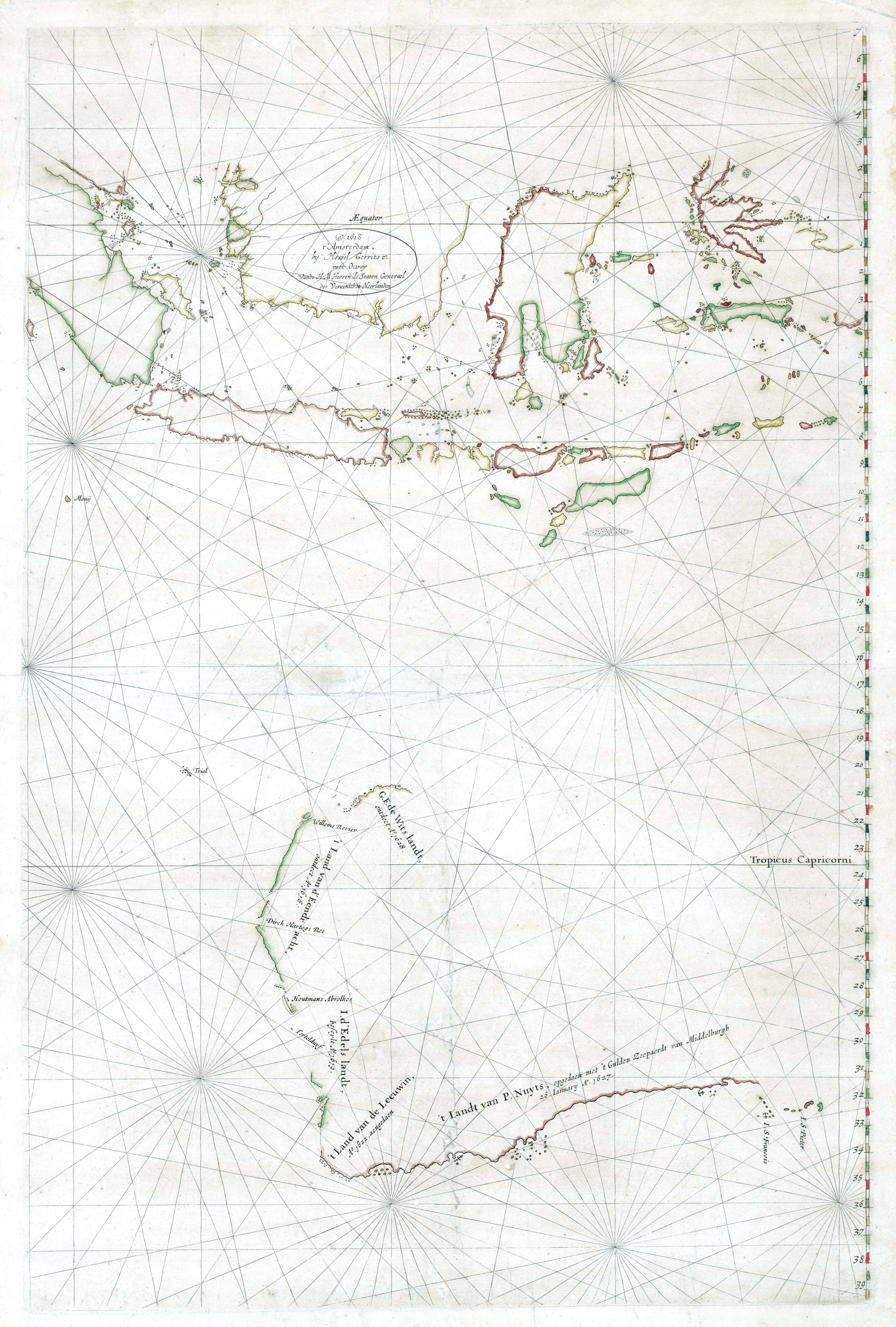
The Malay Archipelago and Australia by Hessel Gerritsz, 1628-32

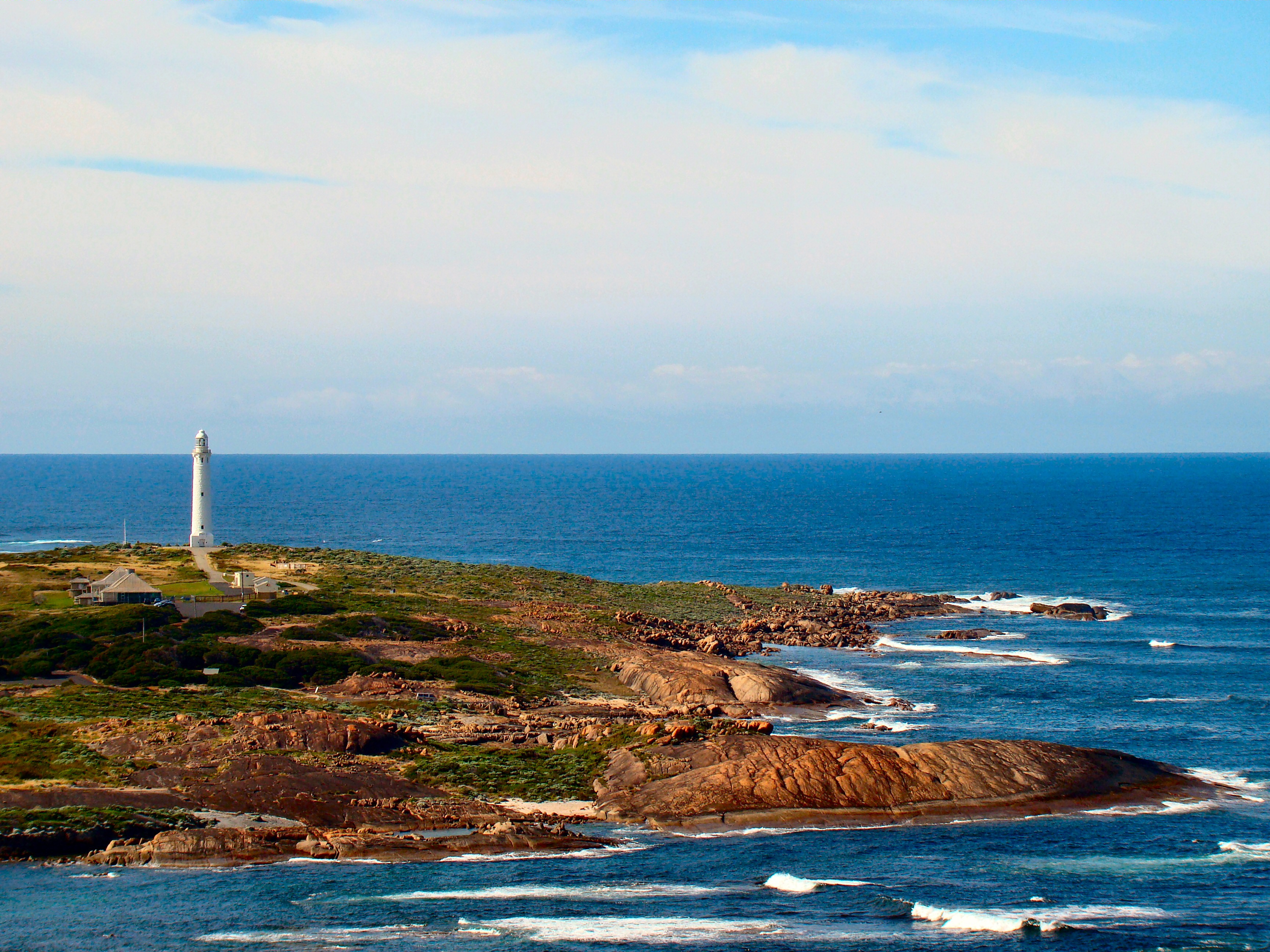
Cape Leeuwin

Gulden Zeepaert (lit. 'Golden Seahorse') was a ship belonging to the Dutch East India Company. It sailed along the south coast of Australia from Cape Leeuwin in Western Australia to the Nuyts Archipelago in South Australia early in 1627.

The captain was François Thijssen.

== Details of the voyage ==
On 22 May 1626 Gulden Zeepaert sailed from the Netherlands under the command of Francois Thijssen (sometimes recorded as Thijszoon and Thyssen). Also on board was Pieter Nuyts, extraordinary member of the Dutch East India Company's Council of India, their executive body in the East Indies.

It appears that in January 1627 the vessel encountered Australia in the vicinity of Cape Leeuwin. Instead of turning north to make for Batavia, as required by Dutch ships of this period, following what is known as the Brouwer Route, it continued along the south coast of Australia for a distance of 1,800 kilometres (1,100 mi). They reached St Francis and St Peter Islands in what is now known as the Nuyts Archipelago, off Ceduna in South Australia. Thijssen mapped the coastline around Fowlers Bay. It has been assumed that one of the trees that was examined during the transit across the south coast of what is now Western Australia was the Christmas tree (Nuytsia floribunda). The South Australian coast has also been recognized as a point of contact. What transpired during this part of the voyage is not known in detail as no log survives. The principal evidence consists of contemporary maps, a brief reference to the voyage in the daily register at Batavia for 1627, and in instructions to Gerrit Thomaszoon Pool in 1636 and Abel Tasman in 1644.

Gulden Zeepaert reached Batavia on 10 April 1627. Records indicate that 30 men died during the voyage. The region they encountered became known as Nuyts Land. Nuyts had also been on board Leeuwin which sighted and named Cape Leeuwin in 1622. According to the Landings List compiled by the Australia on the Map Division of the Australasian Hydrographic Society, Gulden Zeepaert was the 13th recorded European contact with Australia.

== Sources ==
- Heeres, Jan Ernst (1899). The Part Borne by the Dutch in the Discovery of Australia 1606-1765 (in Dutch and English). Leiden, London: Brill Publishers. hdl:2027/njp.32101073851337. LCCN 05012045. OCLC 13214159. OL 52349613M. Wikidata Q133908667.
