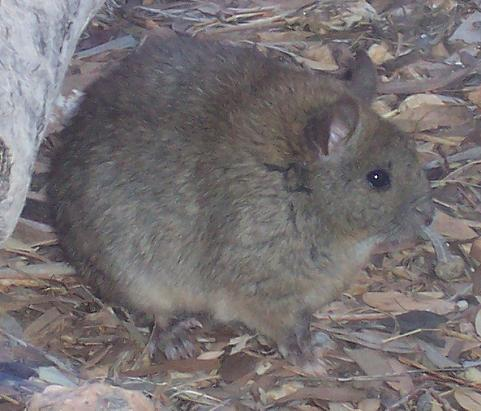

Conservation status
- Near Threatened (IUCN 3.1)
- CITES Appendix II

Scientific classification
- Kingdom: Animalia
- Phylum: Chordata
- Class: Mammalia
- Infraclass: Placentalia
- Order: Rodentia
- Family: Muridae
- Genus: Leporillus
- Species: L. conditor

Binomial name
- Leporillus conditor (Sturt, 1848)
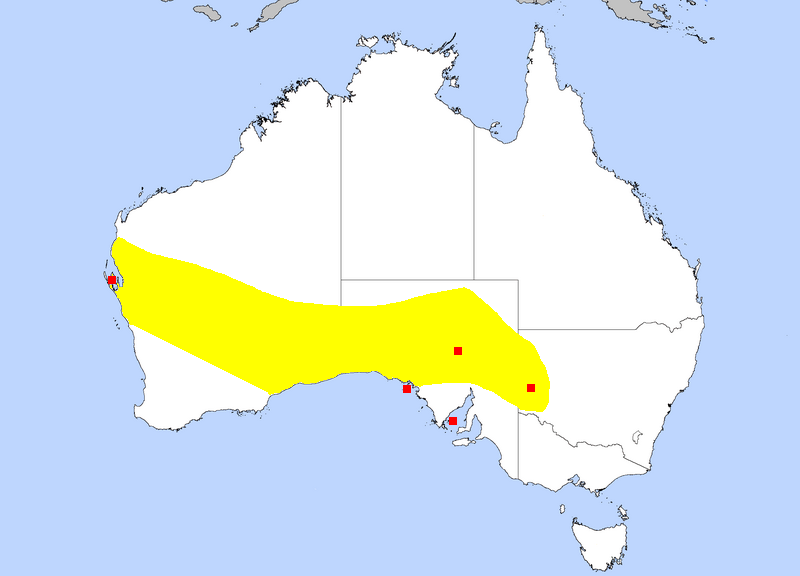

= Greater stick-nest rat =

Species of rodent

The greater stick-nest rat (Leporillus conditor), also known as the housebuilding rat and wopilkara, is a species of rodent in the family Muridae. They are about the size of a small rabbit and construct large nests of interwoven sticks. Once widespread across southern Australia, the population was reduced after European colonisation to a remnant outpost on South Australia's Franklin Islands. The species has since been reintroduced to a series of protected and monitored areas, with varying levels of success. Its close relative, the lesser stick-nest rat, is believed to be extinct.

== Taxonomy ==
A description of the species was given in a report of the explorer Charles Sturt, and published in 1848. The species was placed as genus Mus, and later assigned to Leporillus, and so allied to the murid family of rodents. The type was collected in vegetation on the Darling River, around 45 miles from Laidley Ponds, the disposition of this specimen is unknown.

== Description ==
The species has a broad and short head, with wide and rounded ears. The length of the head and body combined in 190 to 260 millimetres, and a tail noticeably shorter than that, measuring from 148 to 180 mm. The weight ranges from 190 to 450 grams. The pelage is a uniform grey-brown colour at the upper-side, the buff to grey beneath is paler and the two colours blend where they meet. The visible parts of the foot are whitish at the inside and greyish brown at the outside, this is from 42 to 48 mm in length. The female possesses four teats, two pairs at the inguinal region.

== Behaviour ==
The behavioural description is of a passive and gentle species, largely active at night, with a herbivorous diet largely composed of succulent leaves. The 'nest' of L. conditor is sited at a cave, rocky outcrop or over a shrub, the construction reaching a metre in height and around two metres in width. The larger part of the nest is tightly woven from sticks, the inner part is built from softer grassy material.

Ownership of nests appears typically to be passed down through relatively sedentary, genetically related female lines, with males typically distributing throughout the landscape at sexual maturity.

Mainland populations were reported in historical accounts to prefer building nests over slight depressions in the ground or above the burrows of other animals, which were used as escape routes. Some animals were known to weight their nests with small rocks. Nests were reported to be strong and secure enough to repel dingos and other predators.

Some nests built inside refugia such as caves, crevices, rock ledges, burrows or sinkholes have been found to be substantially cooler and better insulated than those built under shrubs, suggesting such sites may be important for local survival during periods of very high temperatures.

Breeding may occur throughout the year, although most often recorded during the austral spring, April to May, and they produce a litter of between one and four young.

The population on Reevesby Island is highly associated with the invasive exotic weed African boxthorn, which provides shelter from predators due to its thorny foliage, and food in the form of leaves and fruit.

== Distribution and habitat ==
The species' natural habitat is dry savanna, with perennial shrubland, especially of succulent and semi-succulent plant species including the chenopod and pig-face genera.

It was formerly widespread in semi-arid habitat on the mainland, where the soils were shallow with calcareous underlying strata. Before the sharp decline in population in the late nineteenth century, the species was found south of a line from Shark Bay to the meeting of the rivers at the Murray–Darling basin and above the 28° southern latitude.

The drastic reduction in the range of this mammal is associated with the collapse of mammalian fauna in Australia between about 1875 and 1925, which is often linked to the decline of aboriginal land management and burning practices, widespread land clearance and agriculture, the introduction of foreign grazing animals including sheep, cattle and rabbits, and invasions by exotic predators like the European red fox and feral cats. The susceptibility of this species to a theorised epizootic event, an unidentified disease spreading from Western Australia, was estimated to be high in modelling of mammal's relative immunity.

The drastic contraction of the distribution range continued until the species could only be found on the Franklin Islands in the Nuyts Archipelago, and from this population the species was reintroduced to protected areas on the mainland and other islands.

== Reintroductions and conservation programs ==
There are introduced or reintroduced populations established on St Peter Island in the Nuyts Archipelago, Reevesby Island and Salutation Island.

A reintroduced population at Arid Recovery, a fenced reserve at Roxby Downs in South Australia, persisted for over 20 years, but is now believed to be locally extinct, following periods of drought, high temperatures, degradation of food plants by over-abundant burrowing bettongs, and the reintroduction of the predatory western quoll.

Reintroduction attempts began at a fenced landscape within NSW's Mallee Cliffs National Park in September 2020, with the species observed as persisting during formal monitoring in 2023.

The species was reintroduced to Dirk Hartog Island in May 2021, with animals sourced from Salutation Island and the Franklin Islands. The site is modelled to have a potential carrying capacity of approximately 10,000 rats, which if ever reached, would make Dirk Hartog Island by far the largest extant population of the species. As of 2025, the species appears to be absent from its initial release sites, with the only known population now clustered around a birrida salt pan marked by natural limestone sinkholes and cavities. With numerous active stick nests found within the crevices, it is believed these underground refugia may have helped the remaining rats survive recent extreme heat.

A high proportion of reintroduction attempts for the species have not been successful. Attempts to reintroduce the species failed at Faure Island and Heirisson Prong in Western Australia, at Yookamurra Sanctuary and Venus Bay Conservation Park in South Australia, and at Scotia Sanctuary and Sturt National Park in NSW.

A series of translocations to the fenced Mount Gibson Sanctuary in Western Australia appear to have failed. Following an estimated population peak of 55 rats in 2023, severe heat and drought conditions coincided with a dramatic population collapse. After February 2024, only one specimen could be located, with the species now likely to have become functionally extinct at the site.

Most failures have been blamed on inadequate habitat, food or release protocols, or excessive predation by monitors, raptors or feral cats, but some of these extirpations have coincided with significant periods of very high temperatures. Hyperdispersal and stress responses due to the presence of predatory goannas were blamed for the failure of the reintroduction on Faure Island.

The catastrophic loss of animals at Sturt National Park — where 75% of the reintroduced rats died within just five days of release — was provisionally blamed on the site's microclimate differing from the rats' origin point, Reevesby Island. This was speculated to have contributed to dehydration, stress and malnutrition among the animals, despite the provision of supplementary wet food. However, it was also acknowledged that the reintroduction site hosts high densities of the predatory crest-tailed mulgara, which had been reintroduced to the site first, on the assumption the predators would not be a threat to the rats.

Since the relatively cool and wet Franklin Islands have seen separated from the Australian mainland for approximately 7,700 years, surviving greater stick-nest rat populations — which all trace their ancestry to the islands — may be poorly genetically adapted to survival in arid or semi-arid mainland environments.

The species is currently being bred in captivity at Monarto Safari Park and Adelaide Zoo, with progeny provided to reintroduction projects. Individuals from a captive population at Taronga Zoological Park have been used in research to improve the knowledge of health data of those in captivity.

The greater stick-nest rat is planned for reintroduction on Flinders Island (South Australia) following confirmation that feral pests have been successfully eradicated from the island.

== See also ==
- Leporillus
- Lesser stick-nest rat
- Rodents of Australia
- Threatened fauna of Australia
- Nuyts Archipeligo
- Dirk Hartog Island
- Mallee Cliffs National Park
