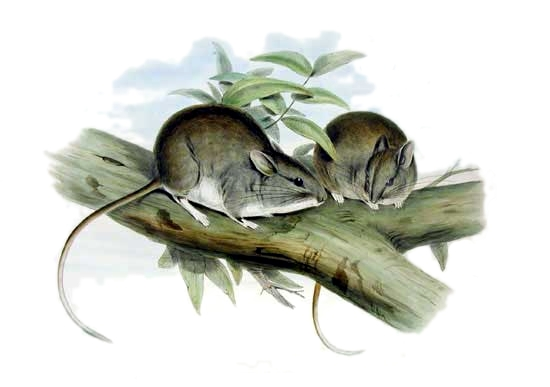
- Leporillus apicalis

Scientific classification
- Kingdom: Animalia
- Phylum: Chordata
- Class: Mammalia
- Order: Rodentia
- Family: Muridae
- Tribe: Hydromyini
- Genus: Leporillus; Thomas, 1906

Species
- †Leporillus apicalis Leporillus conditor

= Leporillus =

Leporillus Temporal range: Early Pleistocene to Recent

Genus of rodents

Leporillus is a genus of rodent in the family Muridae endemic to Australia. It contains the following species:

- Lesser stick-nest rat (Leporillus apicalis) (extinct)
- Greater stick-nest rat (Leporillus conditor)
