= St Francis Island =

Island in South Australia

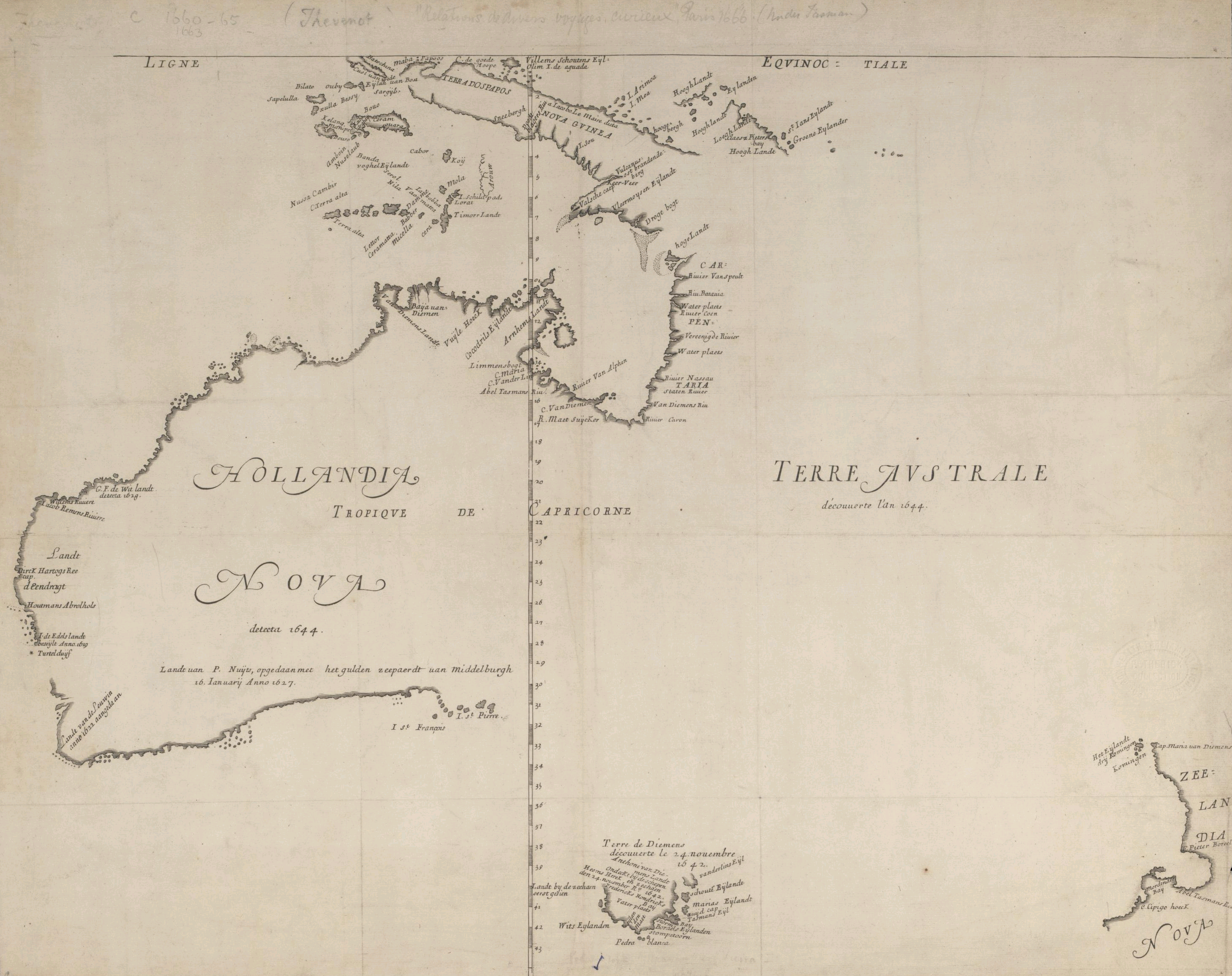
- The island appears on this 1644 map as "I St. François"

- Location within South Australia

Geography
- Location: Great Australian Bight
- Coordinates: 32°30′43″S 133°17′29″E
- Archipelago: Nuyts Archipelago

Administration
- Australia

St Francis Island (originally in Dutch: Eyland St. François) is an island on the south coast of South Australia near Ceduna. It is part of the Nuyts Archipelago. It was one of the first parts of South Australia to be discovered and named by Europeans, along with St Peter Island, mapped by François Thijssen in 't Gulden Zeepaert in 1627.

== Flora & Fauna ==
The flora and fauna of St Francis Island in the 1900s included petrels, Australian sea lions and little penguins.

== Protected area status ==
=== Statutory reserves ===
The island is part of the Nuyts Archipelago Wilderness Protection Area while the waters surrounding its shores are within the Nuyts Archipelago Marine Park.

=== Non-statutory arrangements ===
==== Important Bird Area ====
The island is part of the Nuyts Archipelago Important Bird Area (IBA), so identified by BirdLife International because it supports over 1% of the world populations of short-tailed shearwaters, white-faced storm-petrels and pied oystercatchers.

== See also ==
- List of islands of Australia
