= François Thijssen =

17th-century Dutch-French explorer

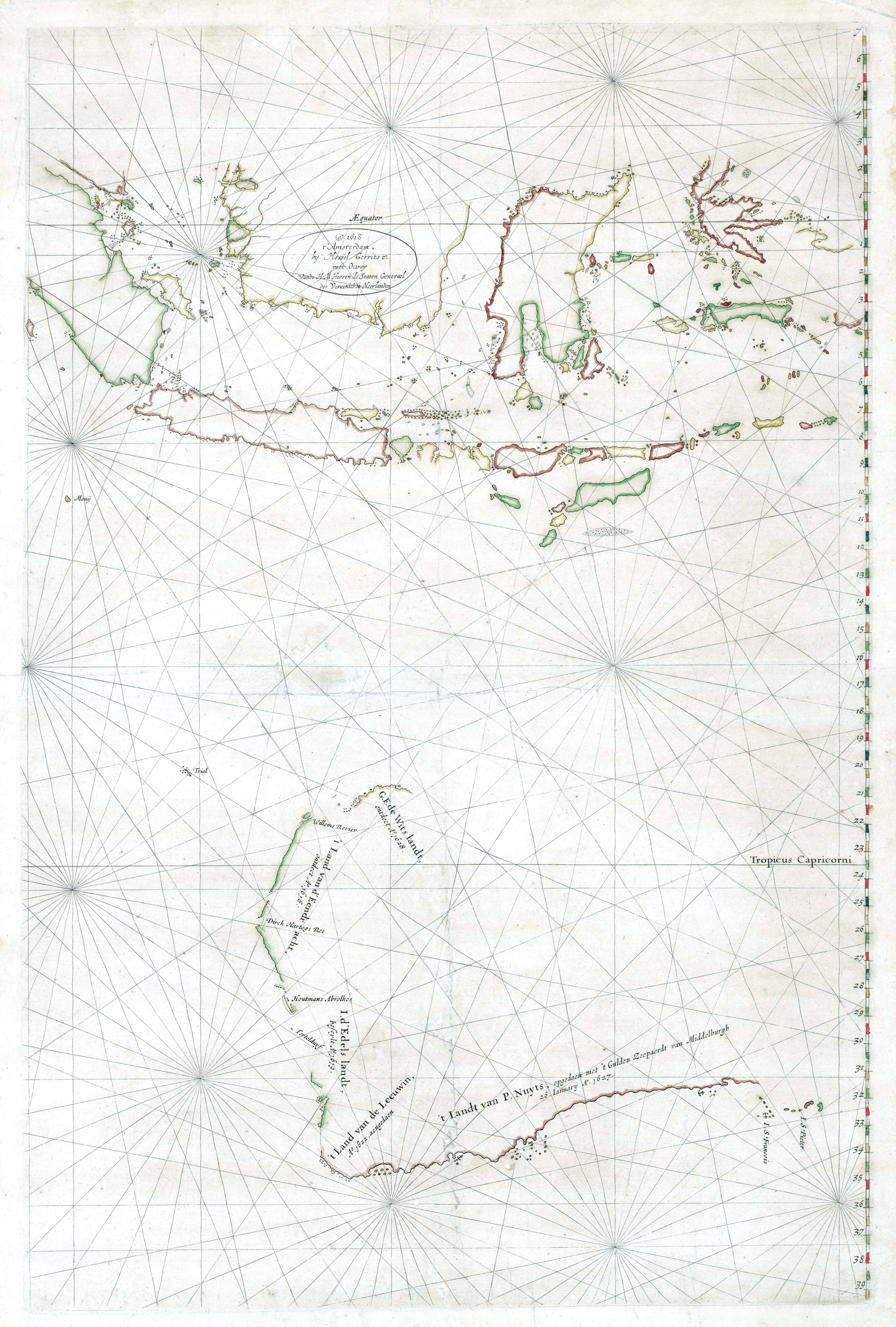

François Thijssen or Frans Thijsz (died 13 October 1638?) was a Dutch-French explorer who explored the southern coast of Australia.

He was the captain of the ship 't Gulden Zeepaerdt (The Golden Seahorse) when sailing from Cape of Good Hope to Batavia. On this voyage, he ended up too far to the south and on 26 January 1627 he came upon the coast of Australia, near Cape Leeuwin, the south-westernmost tip of the continent. Thijssen continued to sail eastwards, mapping more than 1,500 kilometres (930 mi) of Australia's coast. He called the land 't Land van Pieter Nuyts (The Land of Pieter Nuyts), referring to the highest VOC official aboard his ship. Part of Thijssen's map shows the islands St Francis and St Peter, now known collectively with their respective groups as the Nuyts Archipelago. He also mapped the coastline around Fowlers Bay.

The ship, which had been built in Middelburg and left Zeeland on 22 May 1626, finally arrived in Batavia on 10 April 1627. Thijssen's observations were included as soon as 1628 by the VOC cartographer Hessel Gerritsz in a chart of the Indies and "New Holland".

This voyage defined most of the southern coast of Australia and discouraged the notion that New Holland, as it was then known, was linked to Antarctica. Much later, Thijssen's findings led Jean-Pierre Pury to propose a Dutch colony on the mainland there in 1717–18.

Thijssen took the Gulden Zeepaerdt back to Middelburg in 1629–1630.

He was captain on the ship Valk which sailed in 1636 from Zeeland to Batavia. Later, this ship perished near Pulicat in southeast India on 13 October 1638, though it is unclear if François Thijssen was its captain at the time.

In his 1726 novel Gulliver's Travels, Jonathan Swift placed Lilliput and Blefuscu near the unimaginably remote Nuyts Archipelago, a hundred years after their discovery.

South Australia was not visited again by Europeans for 165 years, when in 1792 the French explorer Antoine Bruni d'Entrecasteaux searched there for his lost compatriot La Pérouse.

== See also ==
- European exploration of Australia
- Dutch exploration of Australia
- Terra Australis

== General references ==
- Pearson, Michael Naylor (2005). Cresswell, Margaret (ed.). Great Southern Land: The Maritime Exploration of Terra Australis (PDF). Canberra: Department of the Environment and Heritage. ISBN 0-642-55185-5. OCLC 67617194. OL 26818732M. Wikidata Q110529184. Archived from the original (PDF) on 4 October 2023.
- Data on trips of the VOC ships ‘’Gulden Zeepaard’’ and ‘’Valk’’
