= Wururoo =

Wururoo Temporal range: Late Oligocene, 26.0-24.0 Ma

Scientific classification
- Kingdom: Animalia
- Phylum: Chordata
- Class: Mammalia
- Infraclass: Marsupialia
- Order: Diprotodontia
- Family: †Balbaridae
- Genus: †Wururoo; Cooke, 1997
- Species: †W. dayamayi

Binomial name
- †Wururoo dayamayi Cooke, 1997

Extinct genus of marsupials

Wururoo is an extinct genus of balbarid macropod known from the Late Oligocene of northeastern Australia. The genus contains a single species, Wururoo dayamayi, known from a single lower jaw bone collected at the Riversleigh World Heritage Area in Queensland. This taxon might represent a junior synonym of Balbaroo. Like most balbarids, it had a folivorous (leaf-based) diet.

== Discovery and naming ==
The holotype and only known specimen of Wururoo, QM F19820, was recovered from the Late Oligocene-aged White Hunter Site of the Riversleigh World Heritage Area, in the Boodjamulla National Park, north-western Queensland. The specimen consists of a fragment of the right dentary preserving a lower premolar and all four lower molars. The remains were described and named as a new genus and species of macropod by Australian palaeontologist Bernard Cooke in 1997, alongside a new species of Nambaroo. Fossil material belonging to two additional species of Wururoo was reported from several Early Miocene deposits at Riversleigh, but were later referred to the closely related Balbaroo fangaroo.

The generic epithet, Wururoo, is a combination of the Mayabic word "wuru", meaning long ago, and the diminutive word for kangaroo. The specific epithet, dayamayi, combines the Waanyi words "daya", meaning chop, and "mayi", meaning tooth, in reference to its tall, blade-like premolar.

A study published in 2014 suggested that the species might potentially be a junior synonym of Balbaroo gregoriensis, but stated that more specimens were needed to test this proposal.

== Description ==
The holotype dentary of Wururoo is at its deepest beneath the third and fourth lower molars. A short gap, or diastema, is present between the third lower premolar and first lower incisor, with a low ridge running along its entire length. Two small mental foramina are present on the horizontal ramus, one below and slightly in front of the premolar and the other below the back half of the second molar. The masseteric canal extends far forwards until it reaches the front of the second molar, where the remainder of the canal is blocked by undissolved matrix. On the lingual (inner; towards the tongue) side of the dentary, the mandibular symphysis extends backwards until it is below the midpoint of the premolar. The lower premolar of Wururoo shares several similarities with that of Balbaroo fangaroo, in that they are both relatively large, plagiaulacoid, almond-shaped in occlusal view (or top view of the tooth enamel) and have six cuspids, with five of them having associated transcristae. Like all other balbarids, its molars are lophodont, meaning that they have transverse enamel ridges. The first lower molars possesses a very low metaconid, a feature also seen in Balbaroo gregoriensis. It was previously thought that Wururoo could be distinguished from other balbarids by the presence of a protostylid crest running down from the apex of the protoconid on the first lower molar. However, it is variably expressed in B. fangaroo, specifically in unworn juvenile and some less-worn adult specimens.

== Classification ==
Cooke in 1997 identified Wururoo as a member of the subfamily Balbarinae. In 2001, Kear and Cooke elevated the clade to the family level and assigned this genus to a new clade, "Nambarinae", which included Nambaroo and Ganawamaya.

The first systematic phylogenetic analysis to include Wururoo was the one conducted by Leah R. S. Schwartz and Dirk Megirian in their paper describing Nambaroo bullockensis in 2004. In their analysis, which was based on characteristics of the lower first molar, they found it to be nested in between two clades, both containing species of Nambaroo. Additionally, their results did not find support for a monophyletic Nambarinae. A study published in 2007 by Kear and colleagues recovered it as the sister taxon to Ganawamaya acris, a balbarid also known from the Riversleigh WHA. Similar results were also obtained by other researchers like Travouillon and colleagues (2015). In 2014, Black and colleagues argued that Wururoo was a junior synonym of Balbaroo gregoriensis. Using both bayesian and parsimonious phylogenetic analysis, it was found to nest inside of the genus Balbaroo either in a basal polytomy with or as sister taxon to B. gregoriensis. Several years later, Butler and colleagues also found support for these results.

Topology A: Travouillon and colleagues (2015).

- Macropodoidea
  - - Hypsiprymnodon moschatus
    - - †Ekaltadeta ima
      - Balbaridae
        - †Nambaroo gillespieae
        - - †Balbaroo fangaroo
          - - †Ganawamaya acris
            - †Wururoo dayamyi
  - Macropodidae
    - †Bettongia moyesi
    - - Potorous tridactylus
      - - Bettongia penicillata
        - - - †Bulungamaya delicata
            - - †Ganguroo bilamina
              - †Ganguroo bites
              - - †Wabularoo naughtoni
                - †Wabularoo prideauxi
                - - †Wanburoo hilarus
                  - - Macropodinae
                    - Sthenurinae
          - - †Ngmaroo archeri
            - - †Purtia mosaicus
              - †Wakiewakie lawsoni

Topology B: Butler and colleagues (2018).

- Macropodoidea
  - Hypsiprymnodon moschatus
  - †Hypsiprymnodon philcreaseri
  - †Hypsiprymnodon bartholomaii
  - - Propleopinae
      - - †Ekaltadeta ima
        - †Ekaltadeta jamiemulvaneyi
      - - †Jackmahoneya toxoniensis
        - †Propleopus oscillans
    - Balbaridae
      - †Nambaroo saltavus
      - - †Nambaroo tarrinyeri
        - - - - †Ganawamaya acris
              - †Ganawamaya couperi
            - - †Ganawamaya aediculis
              - †Ganawamaya gillespieae
          - - †Wururoo dayamayi
            - †Balbaroo gregoriensis
            - - †Balbaroo fangaroo
              - - †Balbaroo camfieldensis
                - †Balbaroo nalima
  - Macropodidae
    - Potoroinae
    - - †Bettongia moyesi
      - †Wakiewakie lawsoni
      - - †Purtia mosaicus
        - - †Ngamaroo archeri
          - - †Gumardee pascuali
            - - †Bulungamaya delicata
              - - †Ganguroo bilamina
                - †Ganguroo robustiter
                - †Ganguroo bites
                - - †Wabularoo naughtoni
                  - †Wabularoo prideauxi
                - - Lagostrophinae
                  - - Sthenurinae
                    - Macropodinae

== Paleobiology ==
=== Paleoenvironment ===
Wururoo is known only from the Late Oligocene-aged White Hunter Site, located on Hal's Hill of the D-Site Plateau, within the Riversleigh World Heritage Area. It is thought to have been deposited in either a temperate open forest or woodland environment. Plant remains from the similarly aged Dunsinane Site at Riversleigh show that the vegetation at the time was dominated by she-oak (Casuarinaceae) trees or shrubs. Pockets of rainforest may also have been present, specifically around pools or along watercourses, as indicated by fossils of a Burdekin plum relative from the same site as the other plant remains. Many additional macropods have been described from the White Hunter Site, including the balbarids Ganawamaya aediculis and Ganawamaya couperi, the propleopine Ekaltadeta ima, the basal macropodids Bulungamaya delicata, Gumardee pascuali and Gumardee springae, and the possible sthenurine Wabularoo naughtoni.

Other fauna contemporaneous with Wururoo include the thylacinids Badjcinus turnbulli, Ngamalacinus nigelmarveni and Nimbacinus peterbridgei; the ilariid Kuterintja ngama; the wynyardiid Namilamadeta albivenator; and the diprotodontid Ngapakaldia bonythoni.

=== Paleoecology ===
A study published in 2016 by Janis and colleagues found Wururoo to be a specialised folivorous browser using craniodental measurements. Based on its shorter diastema and more robust lower premolar, Wururoo may have had a greater reliance on its premolar for shearing action in food collection and/or processing than its close relative, Ganawamaya.
