= Wakiewakie =

Wakiewakie Temporal range: Early Miocene, 18.53–16.97 Ma Possible Middle Miocene record

Scientific classification
- Kingdom: Animalia
- Phylum: Chordata
- Class: Mammalia
- Infraclass: Marsupialia
- Order: Diprotodontia
- Family: Potoroidae (?)
- Genus: †Wakiewakie; Woodburne, 1984
- Species: †W. lawsoni

Binomial name
- †Wakiewakie lawsoni Woodburne, 1984

Extinct genus of marsupials

Wakiewakie is an extinct genus of macropod known from the Early Miocene, and possibly Middle Miocene, of central and northeastern Australia. The genus contains a single species, Wakiewakie lawsoni, based on lower jaw bones and isolated teeth from the Wipajiri Formation and Riversleigh World Heritage Area. It was initially thought to belong to the subfamily Potoroinae, but more recent analyses place it as a basal member of Macropodidae or Macropodoidea.

== Discovery and naming ==
In 1971, a joint expedition by the South Australian Museum and the University of California discovered the remains of a small macropod at Lake Ngapakaldi, north-eastern South Australia. The fossils were later described and named in 1984 as a new genus and species by Michael Woodburne. The type specimen of Wakiewakie, SAM P17897, is a left mandible from the Kutjamarpu Local Fauna of the Wipajiri Formation. Two isolated upper premolars from the same site were also referred to the species. In 1989, Godthelp and colleagues reported additional remains from the Upper Site at the Riversleigh World Heritage Area, north-western Queensland. It was also reported that a new genus and species of potoroine that closely resembled Wakiewakie had been discovered from the Kangaroo Well Local Fauna in the Northern Territory.

The generic epithet is an onomatopoetic rendition of an early morning call that was often heard at the field camp during the 1971 expedition. The specific epithet honours Paul F. Lawson, in recognition for his important contributions to science.

== Description ==
One of the most distinct features of Wakiewakie is its very deep mandible, reaching a maximum depth of 11.2 mm (0.44 in). The masseteric canal is very large, extending from the mandibular foramen of the masseteric fossa to just below the anterior root of the third lower premolar. On the inner side of the mandible, the symphysis (where the two halves of the lower jaw connected) is relatively short. The ascending ramus rises from the horizontal ramus at an angle of nearly 90°. While the lower incisor isn't persevered, the orientation and shape of its alveolus indicates that it was long and slender. A 3 mm (0.12 in) long diastema separates the first lower incisor from the third lower premolar, which would have resulted in Wakiewakie having a shorter snout. The third lower premolar itself is elongate, measuring 11 mm (0.43 in) long, which makes it the relatively longest premolar known for any macropod. The tooth has a rectilinear outline and, unlike Hypsiprymnodon, a horizontal dorsal profile. A cingulum-like bulge is present at the buccal and lingual bases of the premolar, although it is most distinct on the buccal side. The buccal side is also ornamented with 20 vertical ribs called transcristds, with 19 or more being present on the lingual side. These transcristids terminate into cuspids along the ridge running lengthwise across the middle of the tooth. The lower molars are short, low-crowned and bunolophodont, having rounded cusps and prominent ridges running transversely along (across) their occlusal surfaces. They have a squarish occlusal outline, but are slightly longer than wide. The surfaces of the protoconid and metaconule are sloped rather than straight as in potoroids. The protoconid and hypoconid are connected by a transverse crest to the metaconid and entoconid, respectively. The protolophid and hypolophid run parallel to each other.

The upper third premolar is very similar to the lower premolar but differs in a few key ways. For instance, the blade crest curves towards the cheeks at its back end. The tooth is as broad towards the back as the front. It bears a stronger lingual cingulum-like bulge on its back quarter. None of the buccal or lingual transcristae curve towards the back and bottom of the tooth. None of the transcristae reach the base of the crown. Both sides of the tooth have 17 transcristae, instead of 20.

== Classification ==
Wakiewakie has been classified in a number of different positions within Macropodoidea since its description in 1984. Originally, it was classified as a member of the subfamily Potoroinae. In the same year, Case described Purtia and considered it to be ancestral to Wakiewakie and species of Bettongia. It was further suggested that W. lawsoni belonged to the tribe Potoroini by the author, but would later be reassigned to Bettongini several years later.

In a 1997 conference abstract, palaeontologist Bernard Cooke re-evaluated the phylogenetic relationships of fossil macropods using cranial and dental characters, arguing that Wakiewakie was a bulungamayine macropodoid. Kear and Pledge in their 2008 description of Ngamaroo used a revised version of the dataset from Kear and colleagues (2007) for their cladistic analysis. The analysis placed Wakiewakie in a polytomy with Potoroinae and Macropodidae. Two phylogenetic analyses based on two different datasets were run by Travouillon and colleagues (2015) in an attempt to reassess the phylogenetic relationships of macropodoids. Utilizing the matrix of Kear and Pledge (2008), Wakiewakie formed a clade with Ngamaroo and Purtia that is sister to all other macropodids. The second analysis, which utilized the matrix by Prideaux and Warburton (2010), failed to resolve its relations. A study published in 2016, however, recovered it as the sister taxon of Bettongia moyesi within a monophyletic Potoroinae.

Topology A: Kear and Pledge (2008).

- Macropodoidea
  - - Hypsiprymnodontinae
    - - Propleopinae
      - Balbaridae
  - - Potoroinae
    - - †Ngamaroo archeri
      - †Purtia mosaicus
      - †Wakiewakie lawsoni
    - Macropodidae
      - †Nowidgee matrix
      - - †Ganguroo bilamina
        - †Wabularoo naughtoni
        - - †Bulungamaya delicata
          - - †Wanburoo hilarus
            - derived macropodids

Topology B: Travouillon and colleagues (2016).

- Macropodoidea
  - Hypsiprymnodontidae
  - - Balbaridae
    - Macropodidae
      - Potoroinae
        - †Bulungamaya delicata
        - - - †Purtia mosaicus
            - †Ngamaroo archeri
            - - †Bettongia moyesi
              - †Wakiewakie lawsoni
            - - Potorous tridactylus
              - - Bettongia penicillata
                - Aepyprymnus rufescens
          - - - †Gumaradee springae
              - - †Gumaradee pascuali
                - †Gumaradee richi
      - - †Ganguroo bilamina
        - †Ganguroo bites
        - †Wabularoo naughtoni
        - - Lagostrophinae
          - - Sthenurinae
            - Macropodinae

== Paleoenvironment ==
=== Wipajiri Formation ===
The type locality of Wakiewakie is the Kutjamarpu Local Fauna at the Leaf Locality in the Wipajiri Formation of northern South Australia. The formation is a stream channel fill that unconformably overlies the underlying Etadunna Formation. The age of the formation has been subject to debate but the most recent research indicates that it covers the Early or Middle Miocene. Little is also known about its environment, although it has been speculated that it could have either been temperate wet forest or an, as yet, unknown, drier environment marginal to the river system that produced the formation itself. Impressions of Eucalyptus leaves are known from a shale that overlies the vertebrate-bearing portion of the Wipajiri Formation.

Wakiewakie lived alongside the casuariid Emuarius gidju, as well as the thylacoleonid Wakaleo oldfieldi, the phascolarctid Litokoala kutjamarpensis, the vombatid Rhizophascolonus crowcrofti, the peramelemorphs Bulungu palara, Kutjamarcoot brevirostrum and Madju variae, the ektopodontid Ektopodon serratus, and the pseudocheirids Malru ampelos, Marlu kutjamarpensis, Marlu syke and Paljara tirarensae.

=== Riversleigh World Heritage Area ===
Remains of Wakiewakie have been reported from the Early Miocene-aged Upper Site, which is located on Godthelp's Hill of the D-Site Plateau, within the Riversleigh World Heritage Area. The deposit was formed in a subaqueous environment within a cave. Various factors like the high number of arboreal taxa, overall species richness and the presence of certain rainforest taxa like bubble nesting frogs, lyrebirds and certain bats suggests that a lowland rainforest environment was next to and potentially overhanging the cave entrance. Many additional macropods have previously been described from the Upper Site, including the basal macropodidis Bulungamaya delicata and Ganguroo bilamina, and the propleopine Ekaltadeta ima.

Other contemporaneous fauna include the thylacinid Nimbacinus dicksoni; the malleodectid Barinya wangala; the phascolarctid Nimiokoala graystanesi; the thylacoleonid Lekaneleo roskellyae; the diprotodontid Neohelos tirarensis; the wynyardiid Namilamadeta superior; the pseudocheirids Durudawiri anfractus, Gawinga aranaea and Paljara nancyhaywardae; and the petauroid Djaludjangi yadjana.
