= Evolution of Macropodidae =

The Macropodidae are an extant family of marsupial with the distinction of the ability to move bipedally on the hind legs, sometimes by jumping, as well as quadrupedally. They are herbivores, but some fossil genera like Ekaltadeta are hypothesised to have been carnivores. The taxonomic affiliations within the family and with other groups of marsupials is still in flux.

== Earliest macropods ==
In Australia there are various fossil taxa described from the Oligocene–Miocene boundary from Riversleigh of Queensland, Lake Tarkarooloo, Namba, Etabunna and Wipajiri formations of South Australia. No fossils Macropodidae have been found that predate the Late Oligocene. Using 12S ribosomal RNA transversions, the Hypsiprymnodontidae were found to have diverged from the other macropodids about 45 million years ago, the Macropodinae and Potoroinae about 30 million years ago, and Dorcopsis and Dorcopsulus of New Guinea about 10 million years ago, when they inhabited the Australian mainland. The fossils that have been found are a plesiomorphic form of kangaroo, indicating it is likely that the family dates back even earlier. The earliest post-K–T extinction is the Tingamarra fauna of the Eocene, but no taxa assigned to the Macropodidae have been found in these deposits, and these Eocene species are of uncertain relationship to any Oligocene taxa.

All current families are represented in these Oligocene deposits, but not all sub-families, and those that are not (Sthenurinae, Macropodinae) are found during the rapid evolution of kangaroos in Mid-Miocene to Late Miocene deposits. Of those that are, the hypsiprymnodontid genus Ekaltadeta and isolated molars from the genus Hysiprymnodon are known. Of the Macropodidae, only the plesiomorphic subfamily Bulungamayinae is known, represented by Wakiewakie lawsoni, Gumardee pascuali, Purtia and Palaeopotorous priscus. There are Potoridae, represented by Bettongia moyesi, from the Middle Miocene. The last family from the Oligocene–Miocene boundary consists of species that could be described as a plesiomorphic macropodoids and are ascribed to the extinct family Balbaridae in the genera Nambaroo and Balbaroo.

Nambaroo occurs in fossil formations from the Bullock Creek fauna, which are found in freshwater limestone of the Camfield beds. Other balbarids have been found in Riversleigh and Alcoota fossil deposits. Another family that dates back to this era is the Hypsiprymnodontidae, which includes the two subfamilies Propleopinae and Hypsiprymnodontinae. Both subfamilies have genera of Oligocene age, with the genus Hypsiprymnodon extending that far.

Balaridae is primitive in dental morphology and shares features seen in common with only Hypsiprymnodon moschatus, some other Phalangeroidea and primitive macropodines. These features discount all potoroids from being ancestors to the macropodids on these structural grounds. They consist of a compressed trigonid on the first lower molar, straight molar row and strongly twisted dentary. Primitive macropodines have the straight molar row in common. Ekaltadeta also has plesiomorphic features in that the dental canal and masseteric canal are separated anteriorly, below premolar three and the first molar, with the masseteric canal terminating in a cul-de-sac. This it shares with no other macropodids. Another feature that it only shares with Hypsipromnodon is that the lower second premolar is not evicted by the third premolar.

== Extinctions ==
The Balbaridae, Bulungamayinae and Sthenurinae all became extinct by the Pleistocene. The reasons for their extinctions are unknown, but hypotheses include outdated model climate and habitat changes. Some species of Sthenurus could have been around when humans arrived in Australia, but by this time, they were already progressing towards extinction. As of 2001, the taxonomic affiliations within the family and with other groups of marsupials is still in flux.
