= Bettongia moyesi =

Bettongia moyesi Temporal range: Middle Miocene

Scientific classification
- Kingdom: Animalia
- Phylum: Chordata
- Class: Mammalia
- Infraclass: Marsupialia
- Order: Diprotodontia
- Family: Potoroidae
- Genus: Bettongia
- Species: †B. moyesi

Binomial name
- †Bettongia moyesi Flannery & Archer, 1987

Extinct species of marsupial

Bettongia moyesi is an extinct species of potoroine that inhabited northwestern Australia during the Middle Miocene. It is known from only two specimens, a skull and an isolated dentary, which were found at Riversleigh, Queensland. Its relations to other potoroines remain unclear, and could possibly represent a stem macropodid.

== Discovery and naming ==
The first fossils of Bettongia moyesi were discovered in 1984 at the Two Trees site within the Riversleigh World Heritage Area, north-western Queensland. They were subsequently described as a new species of bettong in 1987 by palaeontologists Timothy F. Flannery and Michael Archer. The holotype specimen, QM F13026, is a largely complete skull and lower jaw, with another jaw obtained at the nearby Henk's Hollow site being also referred to this species.

The specific epithet was proposed by the authors for a chairman of IBM Australia, Allan Moyes, due to the corporation's assistance in transporting large amounts of fossiliferous limestone from Riversleigh to Sydney.

== Description ==
The skull and teeth of Bettongia moyesi exhibit several unique characteristics that distinguish it from all other species of Bettongia. The parietal-alisphenoid contact is broad, which is also observable in some specimens of the boodie. The dentary possesses a lower second incisor. Both the second and third upper molars have a single large buccal root. The lacrimal contributes very little to the face. It further differs from the modern eastern bettong and brush-tailed bettong in that it has a relatively short premaxilla, small third upper incisor, maxilla with a larger orbital wing, and a bowed or arched nasal-frontal suture. Most of these traits are shared with the boodie and are considered to be plesiomorphic features within Bettongia. However, it differs from the boodie in that it has more elongate nasals and lacrimals that are positioned closer to the dorsal surface of the skull.

== Classification ==
=== As a potoroine ===
The relationship between Bettongia moyesi and other macropods has long been the subject of debate. Flannery and Archer initially described Bettongia moyesi as a close relative of Bettongia lesueur and a member of the newly-named clade Bettongini. At that time, the group only contained species of Bettongia, Aepyprymnus and Caloprymnus. However, subsequent studies have since referred the fossil taxa Borungaboodie, Gumardee, Milliyowi and Wakiewakie to the clade. The first phylogenetic analysis to include Bettongia moyesi was that of Kear and colleagues in 2007, which reaffirmed its taxonomic placement within the family Potoroidae. Following the 2015 redescription of the early macropodid Wabularoo, Bettongia moyesi was recovered in an unresolved polytomy with other traditionally recovered potoroines. A study published a year later by the same authors recovered it as sister taxon to Wakiewakie, rather than other Bettongia, in a monophyletic Potoroinae within the family Macropodidae. The authors hence suggested that the generic attribution of B. moyesi is in need of revision.

- Macropodoidea
  - Hypsiprymnodontidae
  - - Balbaridae
    - Macropodidae
      - Potoroinae
        - Bulungamaya delicata
        - - - Purtia mosaicus
            - Ngamaroo archeri
            - - Bettongia moyesi
              - Wakiewakie lawsoni
            - - Potorous tridactylus
              - - Bettongia penicillata
                - Aepyprymnus rufescens
          - - - Gumaradee springae
              - - Gumaradee pascuali
                - Gumaradee richi
      - - Ganguroo bilamina
        - Ganguroo bites
        - Wabularoo naughtoni
        - - Lagostrophinae
          - - Sthenurinae
            - Macropodinae

=== As a stem macropodid ===
While most studies generally recover Bettongia moyesi as a member of Potoroinae, some select few propose that it was instead a stem macropodid. Cooke (1997a) and Cooke & Kear (1999) both suggested that Bettongia moyesi was a basal bulungamayine macropodid. In 2016, Kaylene Butler and colleagues performed several phylogenetic analyses, both of which found it to be in an outgroup to all other macropodids. Similar results have since then also been recovered by Travouillon and colleagues in 2022.

- Macropodoidea
  - Hypsiprymnodontidae
  - - Propleopinae
    - Balbaridae
  - - Potoroidae
      - Potorous tridactylus
      - - Bettongia penicillata
        - Aepyprymnus rufescens
    - Macropodidae
      - Bettongia moyesi
      - Wakiewakie lawsoni
      - - Purtia mosaicus
        - - Ngamaroo archeri
          - - Gumardee pascuali
            - - - Gumardee richi
                - Gumardee springae
              - - - Gumardee webbi
                  - Gumardee keari
                - - Bulungamaya delicata
                  - - Ganguroo bilamina
                    - Ganguroo robustiter
                    - Ganguroo bites
                    - - Wabularoo naughtoni
                      - Wabularoo prideauxi
                    - - Lagostrophinae
                      - - Sthenurinae
                        - Macropodinae

== Paleobiology ==
Bettongia moyesi is known from remains found at the Two Trees and Henk’s Hollow sites of the Riversleigh World Heritage Area, which are thought to be Middle Miocene in age. At this point in time, the Riversleigh area had a tropical climate and was covered in rainforest habitat. Bettongia moyesi shared its paleoenvironment with other macropods, such as the propleopine Ekaltadeta ima, the balbarid Balbaroo nalima, the basal macropod Ganguroo robustiter, and the sthenurine Wanburoo hilarus. It also lived alongside the palorchestid Propalorchestes novaculacephalus; the diprotodontids Neohelos stirtoni and Nimbadon lavarackorum; and the thylacinids Muribacinus gadiyuli and Nimbacinus dicksoni.

Like modern potoroids, Bettongia moyesi probably used its relatively large, sectorial premolars to crack open hard-shelled nuts and seeds.
