= Tingamarra Fauna =

The Tingamarra Fauna is associated with the early Eocene Murgon fossil site, and contains the earliest known non-flying eutherian, passerine, trionychidae turtles, mekosuchine crocodiles along with frogs, lungfish and teleost fish in Australia. The Murgon fossil site is located near Kingaroy in south-east Queensland (26° 14' S, 151° 57' E).

== Geology ==
Material that represents the fossil component is the MP1 horizon in a sequence of lacustrine clays from Boat Mountain. The geological formation of the site is not known for certain, but may be associated with the Oakdale Sandstone formation. The area was a swamp or shallow lake at the time of deposition, though the habitat has not been determined. Potassium-argon dating of illites has given a date of about 54.6 million years, which is before Australia's separation from Antarctica and South America

== Paleobiota ==
=== Fish ===
Fish of Tingamarra
Genus	Species	Abundance	Notes	Images

=== Amphibians ===
Amphibians of Tingamarra
Genus	Species	Abundance	Notes	Images

=== Reptiles ===
Reptiles of Tingamarra
Genus	Species	Abundance	Notes	Images
Patagoniophis	P. australiensis (Scanlon, 2004)	Many disarticulated vertebrae and fragmented ribs		
Alamitophis	A. tingamarra	Fragmented dentary and rib along with disarticulated vertebrae.		
Kambara	K. implexidens and K. murgonensis			
?Madtsoia	M.sp	Rib head and proximal shaft	Costal tubercle is broken so not able to determine if it was robust as in madtsoiids or slender in proximal view as with the extent serpentes. Some other characteristics indicate a Patagoniophis affinity excluding the large size (3.9 by 2.6 mm), but is still smaller than Madtsoia, to which it is most similar.	
Murgonemys	M. braithwaitei		Almost complete semi-articulated carapace with vertebrae	

=== Mammals ===
Mammals of Tingamarra
Taxon	Species	Material	Notes	Images
Archaeonothos	A. henkgodthelpi	QM F53825, an isolated upper molar.	A carnivorous metatherian of uncertain affinities.	
Australonycteris	A. clarkae	QM F19147, an isolated lower molar; QM F19149, dentary fragment; QM F19148, an isolated upper premolar; QM F19150, a fragment of a periotic.	Oldest bat from the Southern Hemisphere and one of the oldest bats in the world.	
"Chulpasia"	"C". jimthorselli	QM F50411, an isolated upper molar.	A fossil traditionally referred to the paucituberculate Chulpasia, now thought to represent an unrelated marsupial.	
Djarthia	D. murgonensis	QM F31458, dentary and maxillary fragments and isolated teeth; QM F31459 and QM F31460, dentary fragments; QM F52747, QM F52748 and QM F52749, isolated calcanea; QM F36397, QM F36393 and QM F32322, isolated petrosals.	Originally thought to be a marsupial of uncertain affinities, now known to be a keeunamorphian.	
Marsupialia	Indeterminate	QM F30060, an isolated calcaneus.	A marsupial of uncertain affinities. May be attributable to 'Ameridelphia'.	
Peramelemorphia?	Indeterminate	An isolated upper molar.	Currently underscribed, but possibly represents the oldest peramelemorphian.	
Tingamarra	T. porterorum	QM F20564, an isolated lower molar.	Originally classified as a condylarth, now regarded as a mammal of uncertain affinities.	
Thylacotinga	T. bartholomaii	QM F16835, QM F20804, QM F20803, QM F24120, QM F24194, QM F50407, QM F50408 and QM F24485, isolated upper molars; QM F16836, QM F50405, QM F50406, QM F23551, QM F50409 and QM F24333, isolated lower molars.	Possibly a stem-diprotodontian.	

=== Birds ===
Birds of Tingamarra
Genus	Species	Abundance	Notes	Images
			QM specimens F20688 (carpometacarpus) and F24685 (tibiotarsus) from Murgon, Queensland, are fossil bone fragments clearly recognizable as passeriform; they represent two species of approximately some 10 and some 20 cm in overall length.	
			Presbyornithid material similar to Presbyornis.	
