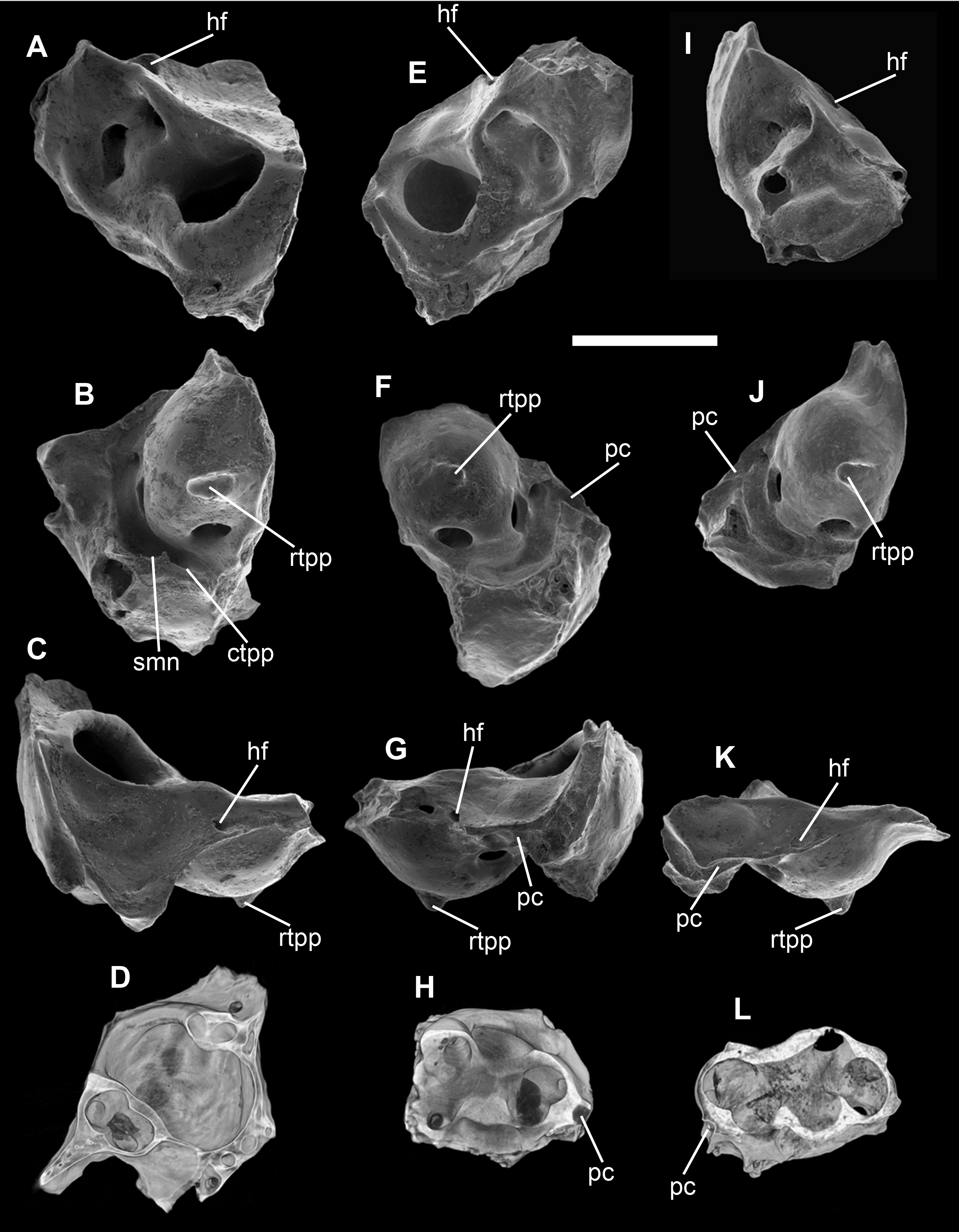
- Isolated petrosals of Djarthia murgonensis

Scientific classification
- Kingdom: Animalia
- Phylum: Chordata
- Class: Mammalia
- Infraclass: Marsupialia
- Order: †Keeunamorphia
- Genus: †Djarthia; Godthelp et al., 1999
- Species: †D. murgonensis

Binomial name
- †Djarthia murgonensis Godthelp, et al, 1999

= Djarthia =

Djarthia Temporal range: Early Eocene

Extinct genus of marsupial

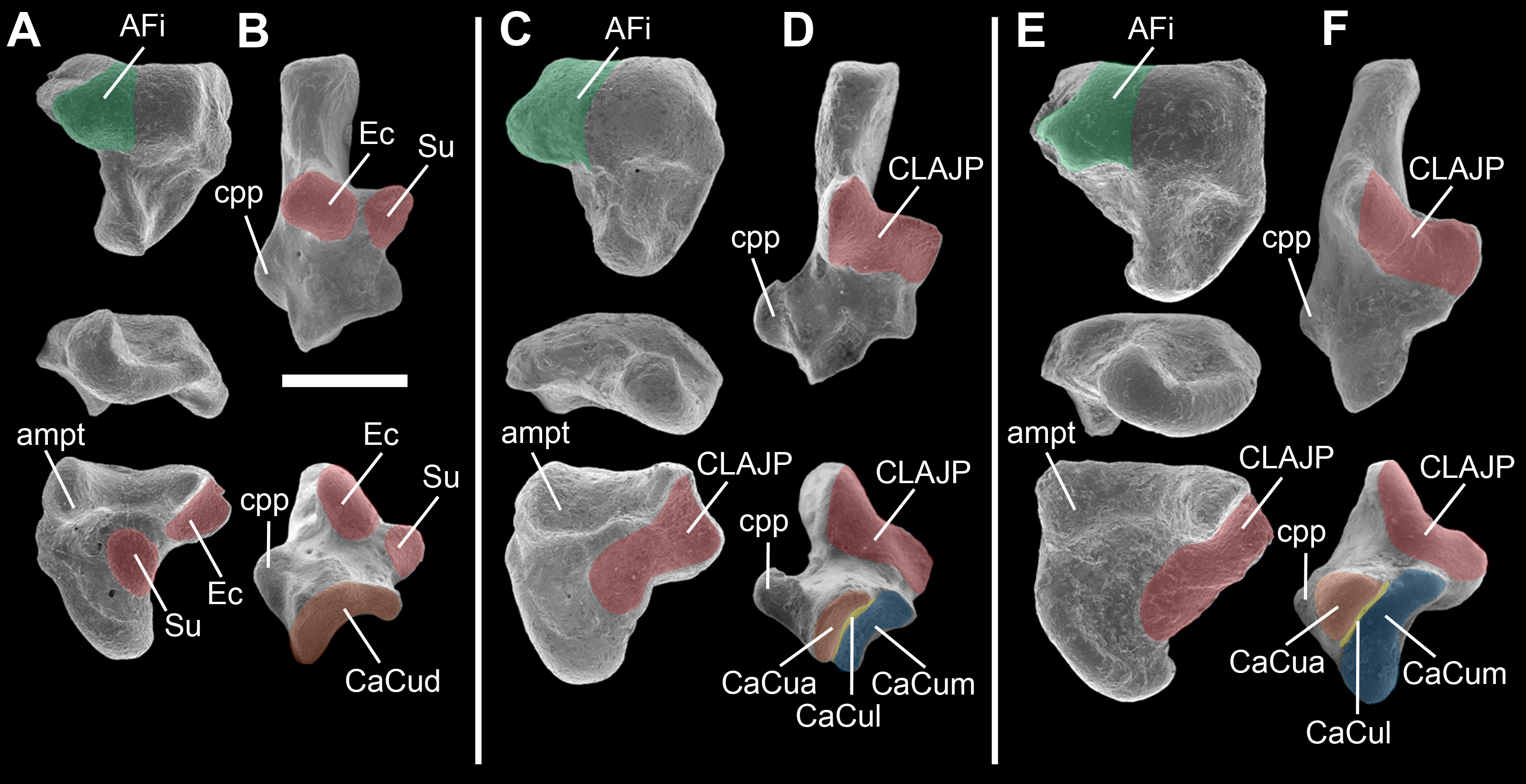
Comparison of isolated tarsals of Djarthia murgonensis with an extant australidelphian marsupial and an extant non-australidelphian ('ameridelphian') marsupial

Djarthia (lit. 'elder sister') is an extinct monotypic genus of marsupial. It is the oldest marsupial found in Australia, discovered at the Murgon fossil site in south-eastern Queensland.

D. murgonensis was described from material identified as Early Eocene Tingamarra fauna, first published in 1999. It was placed with the clade Australidelphia, which includes the marsupials that dispersed throughout Eastern Gondwanan supercontinent during the Eocene and remain extant in Australia and South America. Skeletal material described include a molar, incomplete cochlear and tarsal bone either complete or in fragmented state of preservation.
