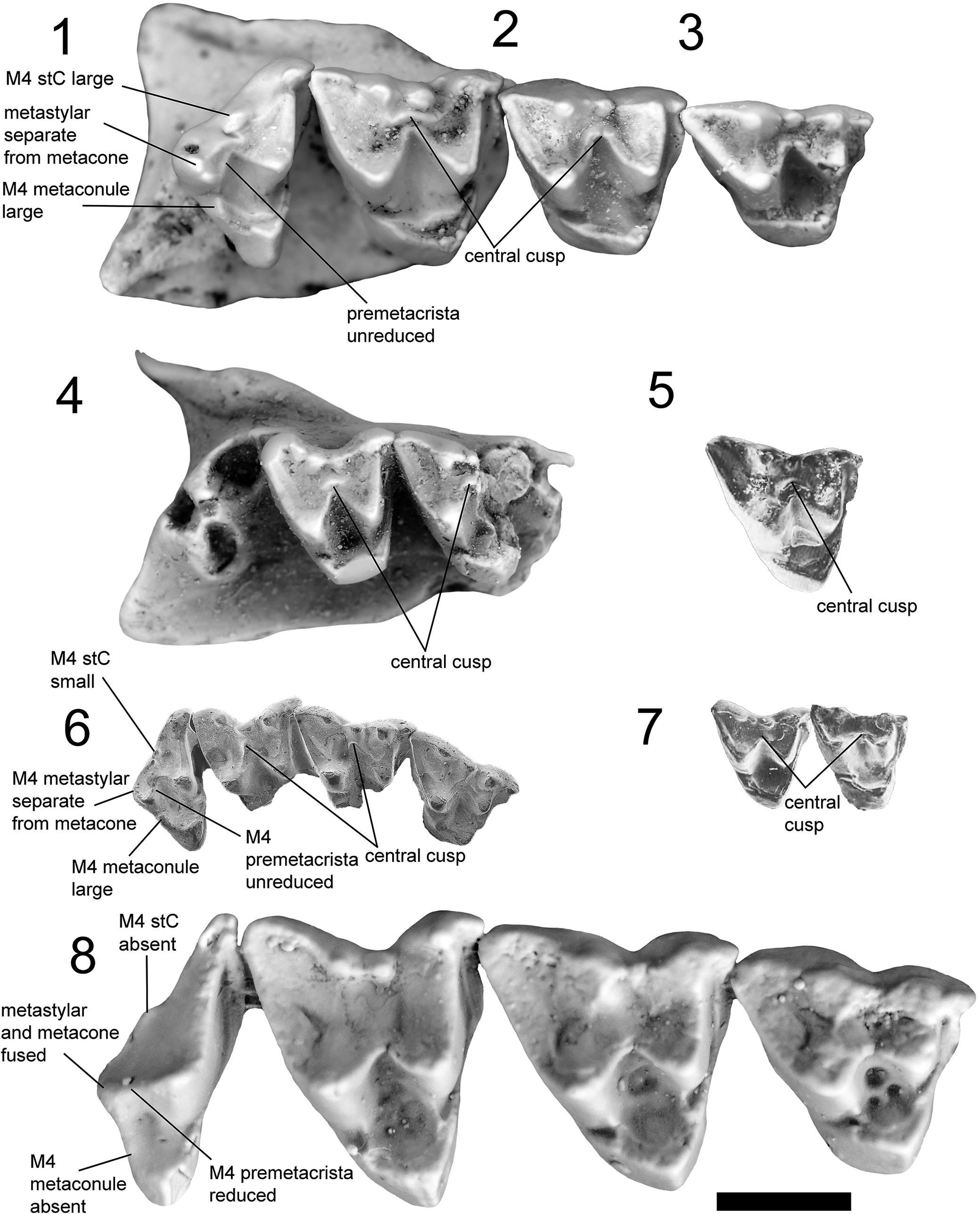
- Upper dentition of A. tirarensis (7) compared to other fossil marsupials

Scientific classification
- Kingdom: Animalia
- Phylum: Chordata
- Class: Mammalia
- Infraclass: Marsupialia
- Order: †Keeunamorphia
- Genus: †Ankotarinja; Archer, 1976
- Species: †A. tirarensis

Binomial name
- †Ankotarinja tirarensis Archer, 1976

= Ankotarinja tirarensis =

Ankotarinja tirarensis Temporal range: Late Oligocene

Genus of extinct marsupials

Ankotarinja tirarensis is an extinct species of keeunamorphian marsupial, known from the Late Oligocene Etadunna Formation of Australia. It is the only species in the genus Ankotarinja, known from several teeth and tooth-bearing bones. The genus was named after Ankotarinja (the Dreaming Man) in Australian Aboriginal religion.
