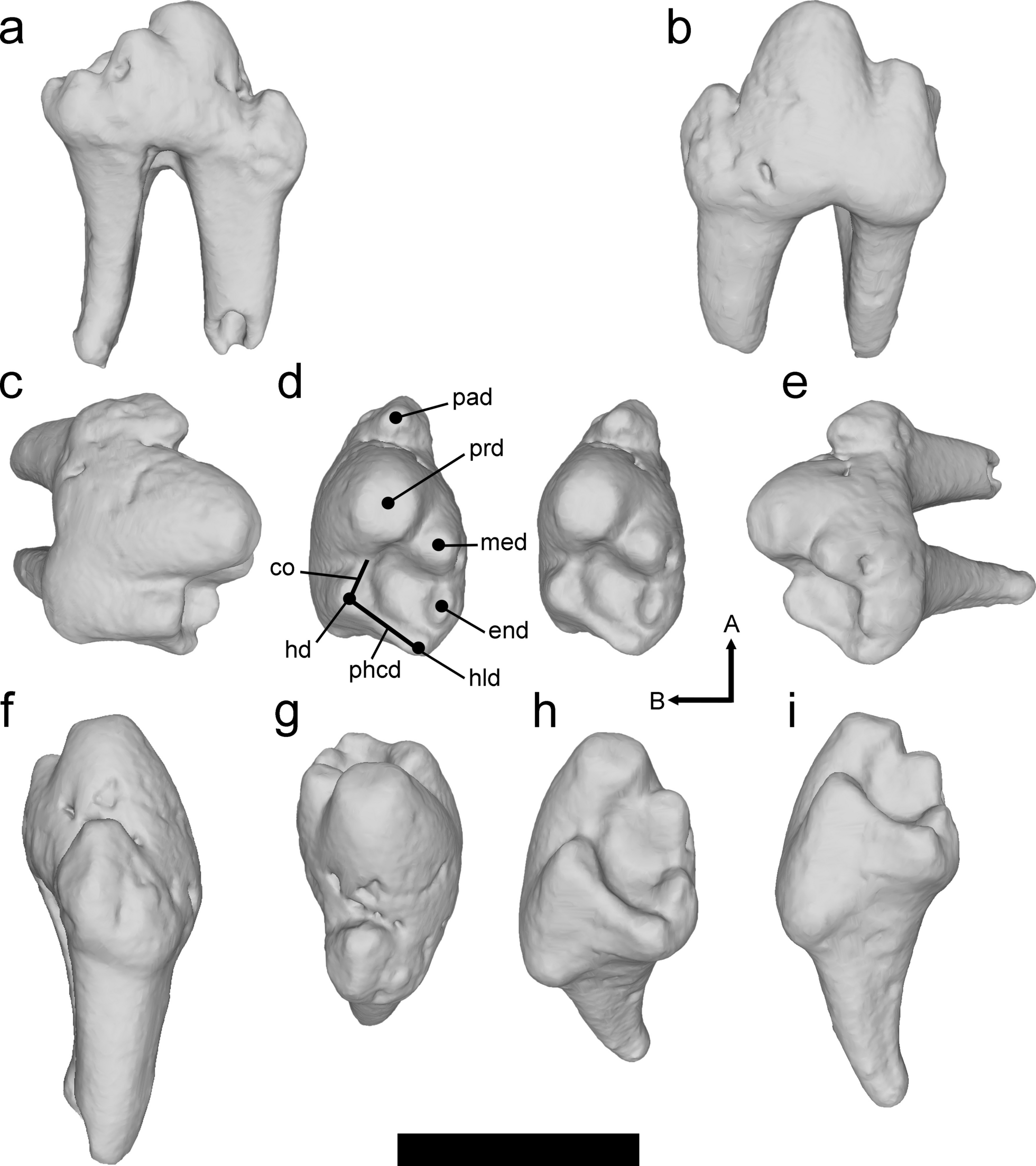
- 3D scans of the holotype specimen

Scientific classification
- Kingdom: Animalia
- Phylum: Chordata
- Class: Mammalia
- Infraclass: Marsupialia
- Order: Dasyuromorphia
- Family: †Malleodectidae
- Genus: †Weirdodectes
- Species: †W. napoleoni

Binomial name
- †Weirdodectes napoleoni Churchill et al., 2025

= Weirdodectes =

Weirdodectes Temporal range: Middle Miocene, 14.82 Ma

Extinct genus of marsupial

Weirdodectes is an extinct genus of unusual marsupial from northeast Australia that lived during the Middle Miocene. Its fossils are known from a single site located at the Riversleigh World Heritage Area. Its diet is unknown, but is thought to have differed from that of other malleodectids. Only a single species is currently assigned to Weirdodectes, the type species W. napoleoni.

== Discovery and naming ==
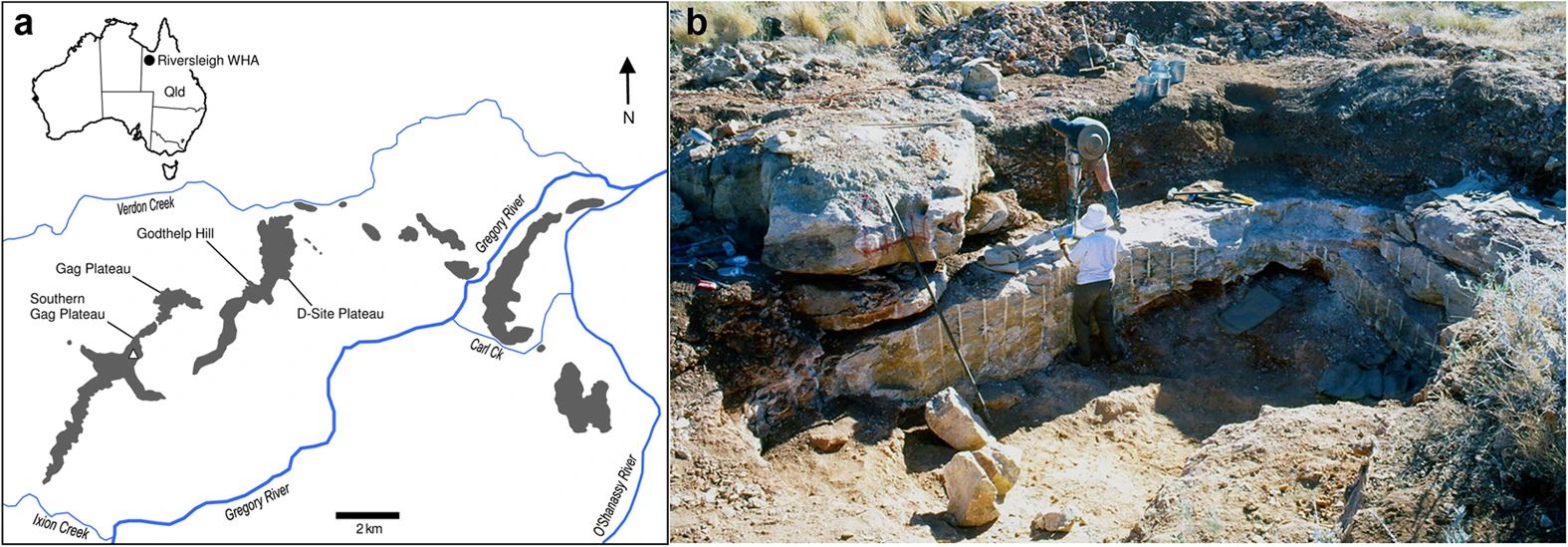
Map of the Riversleigh WHA (a) and excavation of AL90 Site (b).

The holotype and only known specimen of Weirdodectes, QM F61732, was recovered from the Alan's Ledge 1990 Site (AL90) at the Riversleigh World Heritage Area, in the Boodjamulla National Park of north-western Queensland. It consists of an isolated first lower molar.

In 2025, Timmothy Churchill, Michael Archer and Suzanne J. Hand named and described Weirdodectes napoleoni as a new genus and species of malleodectid-like marsupial based on these remains. The genus name derives from the unusual morphology of the first molar, which is unique among marsupials. The species name honours the lead author’s deceased dog, who provided emotional support for them during their studies.

== Description ==
The holotype molar of Weirdocetes is small (~2 mm long) and tribosphenic. The occlusal (biting) surface of the trigonid is mostly made up of a hypertrophied protoconid cusp. The talonid is taller than the paraconid and similar in height to the metaconid. The tooth lacks the anterior and posterior cingulid. Similarly, the paracristids and metacristid crests are also absent. Both the paraconid and metaconid are highly reduced and roughly conical in shape.

Weirdodectes has an estimated body weight of 30.5-101.9 g (1.1-3.6 oz).

== Classification ==
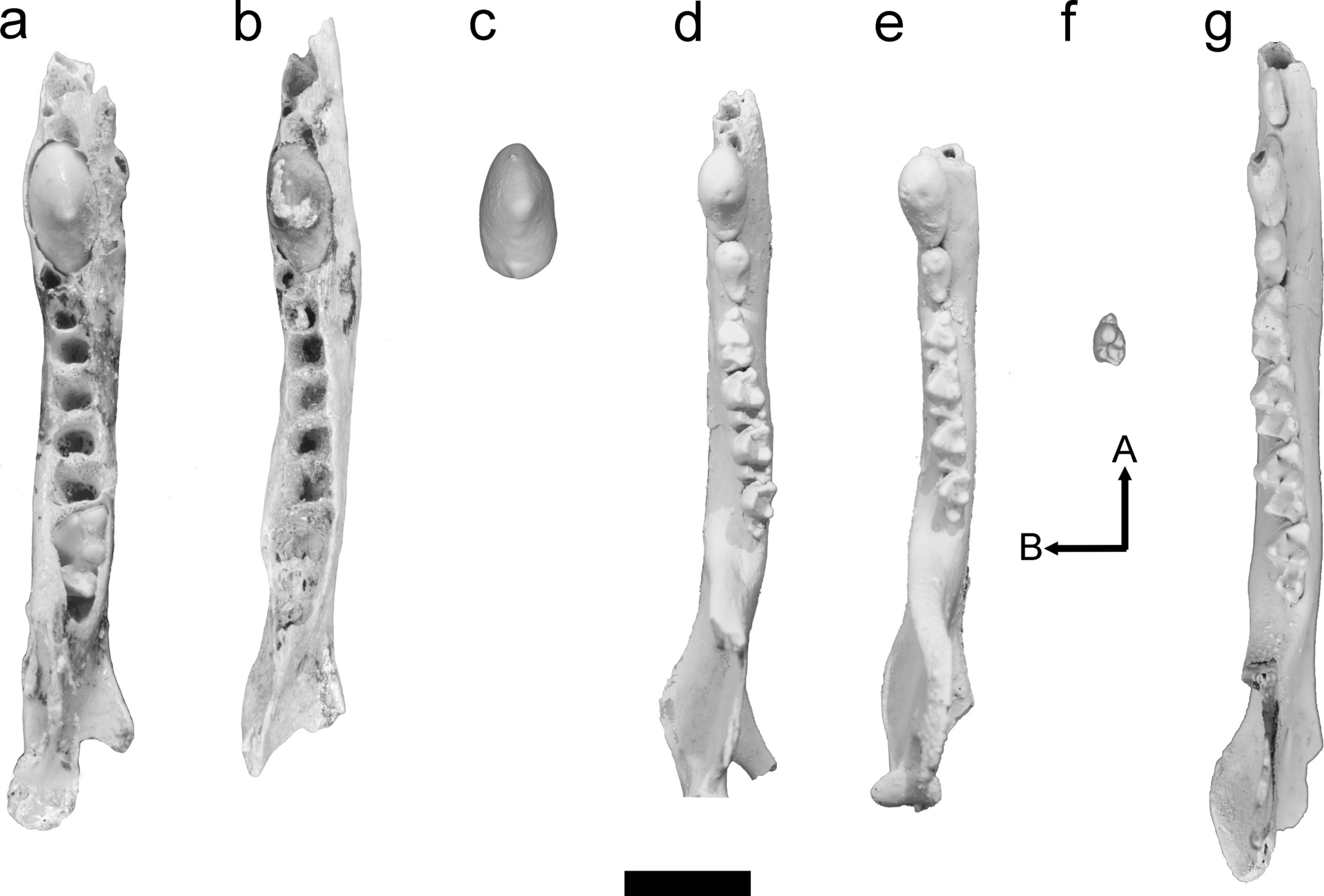
Lower dentition of Weirdodectes (f) compared to other malleodectids.

Churchill et al. (2025) excluded Weirdodectes from their phylogenetic analyses due to the lack of material. The authors tentatively referred it to Malleodectidae incertae sedis on the basis that it shares a lot of similarities with a species of Malleodectes, M. wentworthi. Such similarities include a small metaconid, a high-crowned talonid, and a lack of anterior cingulid. However, it was also noted by the authors that it could possibly be a peramelemorphian or part of an unidentified group of australidelphians.

== Paleobiology ==
Weirdodectes is known exclusively from the AL90 Site at the Riversleigh World Heritage Area, which at one point was a cave. The site has been radiometrically dated as being about 14.82 ± 0.29 million years old. Fauna discovered at the same site provides evidence for the presence of either open forest or rainforest habitat. Numerous other malleodectids are known from the same time and place as W. napoleoni, including multiple species of Malleodectes and Barinya wangala.

The diet of Weirdodectes is relatively unknown. Its smaller body size probably prevented it from competing for the same foods as other malleodectids. The lack of any cutting blades on its molar suggests that it fed on soft bodied prey (e.g. caterpillars, worms), or possibly fluids (e.g. nectar, sap, blood).
