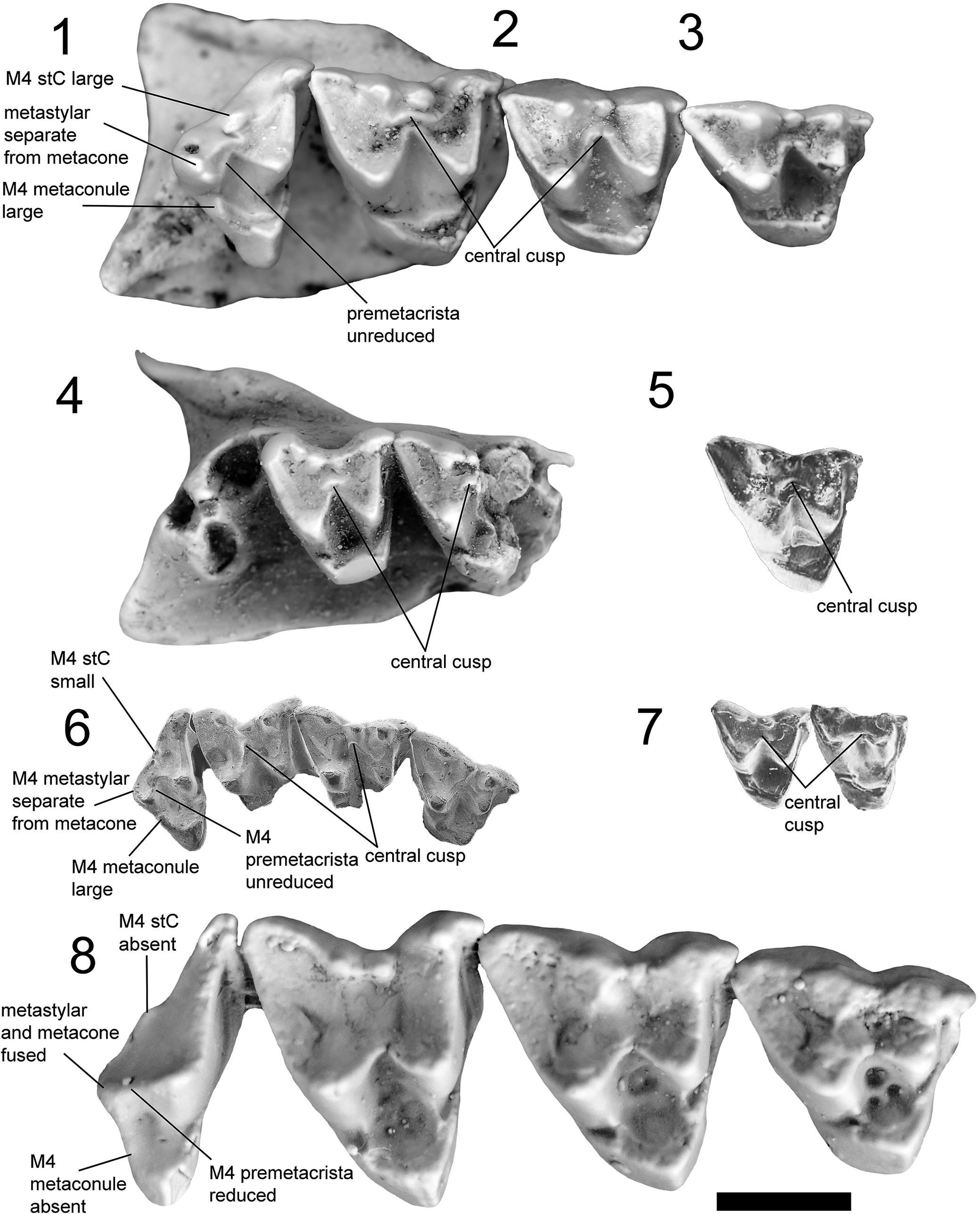
- Upper dentition of K. woodburnei (4, 5) compared to other fossil marsupials

Scientific classification
- Kingdom: Animalia
- Phylum: Chordata
- Class: Mammalia
- Infraclass: Marsupialia
- Order: †Keeunamorphia
- Family: †Keeunidae
- Genus: †Keeuna; Archer, 1976
- Species: †K. woodburnei

Binomial name
- †Keeuna woodburnei Archer, 1976

= Keeuna =

Keeuna Temporal range: Late Oligocene

Genus of extinct marsupials

Keeuna (lit. 'forgotten wild cat') is an extinct genus of keeunamorphian marsupial in the family Keeunidae, known from the Late Oligocene Etadunna Formation of Australia. The genus contains a single species, Keeuna woodburnei, known from several teeth and tooth-bearing bones.

== See also ==
- Phantasmodon
