= Yalkaparidon =

Yalkaparidon Temporal range: Oligocene - Miocene

Scientific classification
- Kingdom: Animalia
- Phylum: Chordata
- Class: Mammalia
- Infraclass: Marsupialia
- Order: †Yalkaparidontia; Archer, Hand & Godthelp, 1988
- Family: †Yalkaparidontidae; Archer, Hand & Godthelp, 1988
- Genus: †Yalkaparidon; Archer, Hand & Godthelp, 1988

Species
- †Yalkaparidon coheni; †Yalkaparidon jonesi

Extinct genus of marsupials

Yalkaparidon is an extinct genus of Australian marsupials, first described in 1988 and known only from the Oligo-Miocene deposits of Riversleigh, northwestern Queensland, Australia.

== Species ==
Two species, Y. coheni and Y. jonesi, have so far been described. Numerous isolated teeth and jaw bones of Yalkaparidon are known, but only a single skull (of Y. coheni) has so far been recovered.

== Etymology ==
The generic name Yalkaparidon comes from an aboriginal word for boomerang, alluding to the boomerang-like shape of its molars when seen in occlusal view, and the Greek word for tooth.

== Characteristics and classification ==
These specimens of Yalkaparidon exhibit a melange of characters: the molars are zalambdodont (a distinctive tooth type also found in the marsupial mole Notoryctes, the living placental 'insectivores' Solenodon, tenrecs and golden moles, as well as a number of fossil groups); the incisors are very large and hypselodont (open-rooted and hence ever-growing, similar to those of rodents); the basicranial region of the only known skull is very primitive, somewhat similar to those of plesiomorphic bandicoots. The zalambdodont molars appear to link it to notoryctid marsupial moles, but detailed study of the teeth of these two groups suggests that they have evolved independently, and Yalkaparidon is anatomically otherwise very different from the marsupial moles. The incisors resemble those of diprotodontians, but no other features convincingly support this relationship, and the convergent evolution of such incisors in South American 'pseudodiprotodont' groups (such as caenolestids and polydolopimorphians) suggests that Yalkaparidon and diprotodontians may have evolved similar incisors independently. Basicranial similarities to bandicoots most likely represent shared plesiomorphic characters, and hence are not indicative of a close relationship.

For these reasons, Yalkaparidon is currently placed in its own family, Yalkaparidontidae, and order, Yalkaparidontia; this placement would make this the only order of Australian marsupials known to have gone extinct. However, Frederick Szalay suggested in his 1994 book 'Evolutionary History of the Marsupials and an Analysis of Osteological Characters' that Yalkaparidon is indeed a diprotodontian (as evinced by its incisors), albeit one that retains a highly primitive basicranium.

The exact function of its unusual dentition remains obscure, and suggestions that it may have fed on worms (based on the similarities of its molars to those of worm-eating tenrecs), caterpillars or eggs are tenuous. However, its source of food presumably had a hard outer covering (necessitating use of the large incisors) but relatively soft interior, as zalambdodont molars cannot crush food items. The possibility that it was a "mammalian woodpecker" similar to the aye-aye and striped possum has been raised.

== Morphology ==
A detailed study on its morphology, including newly referred tarsal material published in 2014 found that it was likely a crown group marsupial, and probably an australidelphian, but its unusual morphology made its precise placement uncertain.
