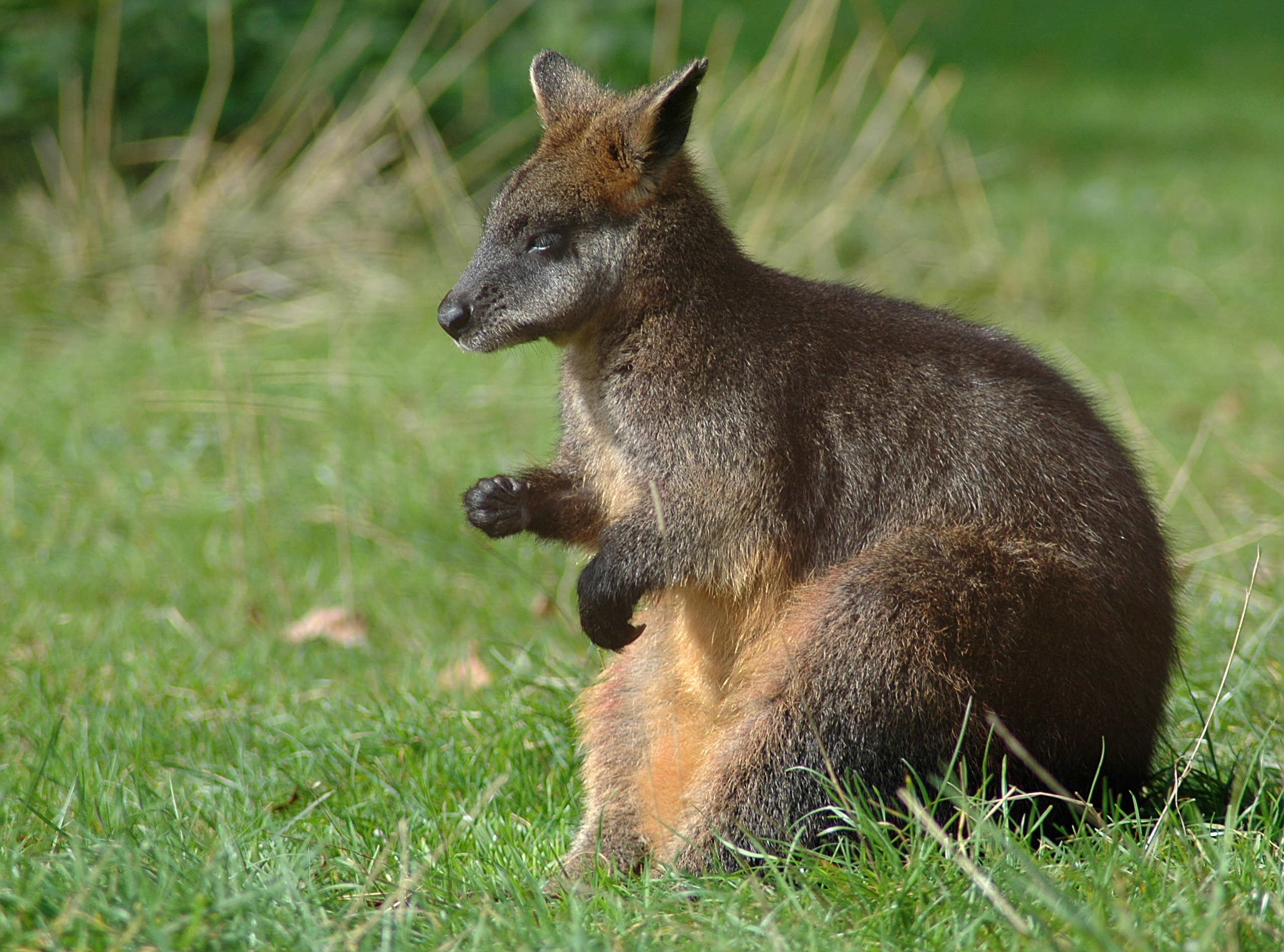
- A swamp wallaby

Scientific classification
- Kingdom: Animalia
- Phylum: Chordata
- Class: Mammalia
- Infraclass: Marsupialia
- Superorder: Australidelphia; Szalay 1982

Orders
- †Keeunamorphia; Microbiotheria; †Polydolopimorphia?; Eomarsupialia Archer, 1984; Diprotodontia; Agreodontia Beck et al., 2014; Dasyuromorphia; Notoryctemorphia; Peramelemorphia

= Australidelphia =

Australidelphia Temporal range: 61.6–0 Ma Early Paleocene to present

Superorder of marsupials

Australidelphia is a superorder of marsupials encompassing about three-quarters of all living marsupial species, including all those native to Australasia and one South American species, the monito del monte. Australidelphia's lineage emerged in South America, with genetic evidence (retrotransposon insertion sites) indicating that the South American monito del monte is sister to all other members of the superorder, unlike other American marsupials, which belong to the Ameridelphia.

Within this superorder, the Australian members form a distinct group (clade) named Eomarsupialia, though their internal relationships (branching order) have yet to be determined. Studies suggest that the Australidelphia originated in South America alongside other major marsupial groups. The Eomarsupialia likely dispersed to Australia via Antarctica in a single event after their divergence from their sister group, the Microbiotheria.

== Phylogeny ==
The following cladogram is a phylogeny of Australidelphia based on the work of May-Collado, Kilpatrick & Agnarsson 2015, with extinct clades from Black et al. 2012.

- Australidelphia
  - Microbiotheria
    - †Woodburnodontidae
    - Microbiotheriidae
  - Eomarsupialia
    - Agreodontia
      - Notoryctemorphia
        Notoryctidae
      - - Peramelemorphia
          - †Yaraloidea
            †Yaralidae
          - Perameloidea
            - Thylacomyidae
            - - Peramelidae
              - - †Chaeropodidae
                - Peroryctidae
        - Dasyuromorphia
          - †Thylacinidae
          - - Myrmecobiidae
            - Dasyuridae
    - Diprotodontia
      - Vombatiformes
        - Phascolarctimorphia
          Phascolarctidae
        - Vombatimorphia
          - †Thylacoleonidae
          - - ?†Wynyardiidae
            - †Ilariidae
            - - †Maradidae
              - - Vombatidae
                - - †Palorchestidae
                  - †Diprotodontidae
      - Phalangerida
        - Phalangeriformes
          - Burramyoidea
            Burramyidae
          - Phalangeroidea
            - Phalangeridae
            - - ?†Pilkipildridae
              - - †Ektopodontidae
                - †Miralinidae
        - Macropodiformes
          - Petauroidea
            - Acrobatidae
            - - Tarsipedidae
              - - Petauridae
                - Pseudocheiridae
          - Macropodoidea
            - ?†Balbaridae
            - - Hypsiprymnodontidae
              - - Potoroidae
                - Macropodidae

== Taxonomy ==
The orders and families within this group are listed below:

- Order Dasyuromorphia (71 species)
  - Family Dasyuridae: antechinuses, quolls, dunnarts, Tasmanian devil, and allies
  - Family Myrmecobiidae: numbat
  - Family †Thylacinidae: thylacine
- Order Diprotodontia (117 species)
  - Family Acrobatidae: feathertail glider and feather-tailed possum
  - Family Burramyidae: pygmy possums
  - Family Hypsiprymnodontidae: musky rat-kangaroo
  - Family Macropodidae: kangaroos, wallabies, and allies
  - Family Petauridae: striped possum, Leadbeater's possum, yellow-bellied glider, sugar glider, mahogany glider, squirrel glider
  - Family Phalangeridae: brushtail possums and cuscuses
  - Family Phascolarctidae: koala
  - Family Potoridae: potoroos, rat kangaroos, bettongs
  - Family Pseudocheiridae: ringtailed possums and allies
  - Family Tarsipedidae: honey possum
  - Family Vombatidae: wombats
  - Family †Diprotodontidae: giant wombats
  - Family †Palorchestidae: marsupial tapirs
  - Family †Thylacoleonidae: marsupial lions
- Order †Keeunamorphia Churchill et al., 2026
  - Family †Keeunidae Churchill et al., 2026
- Order Microbiotheria (1 species)
  - Family Microbiotheriidae: monito del monte
- Order Notoryctemorphia (2 species)
  - Family Notoryctidae: marsupial moles
- Order Peramelemorphia (21 species)
  - Family Peramelidae: bandicoots and allies
  - Family Thylacomyidae: bilbies
  - Family †Chaeropodidae: pig-footed bandicoots
- Order †Yalkaparidontia Archer, Hand & Godthelp 1988
  - Family †Yalkaparidontidae Archer, Hand & Godthelp 1988
