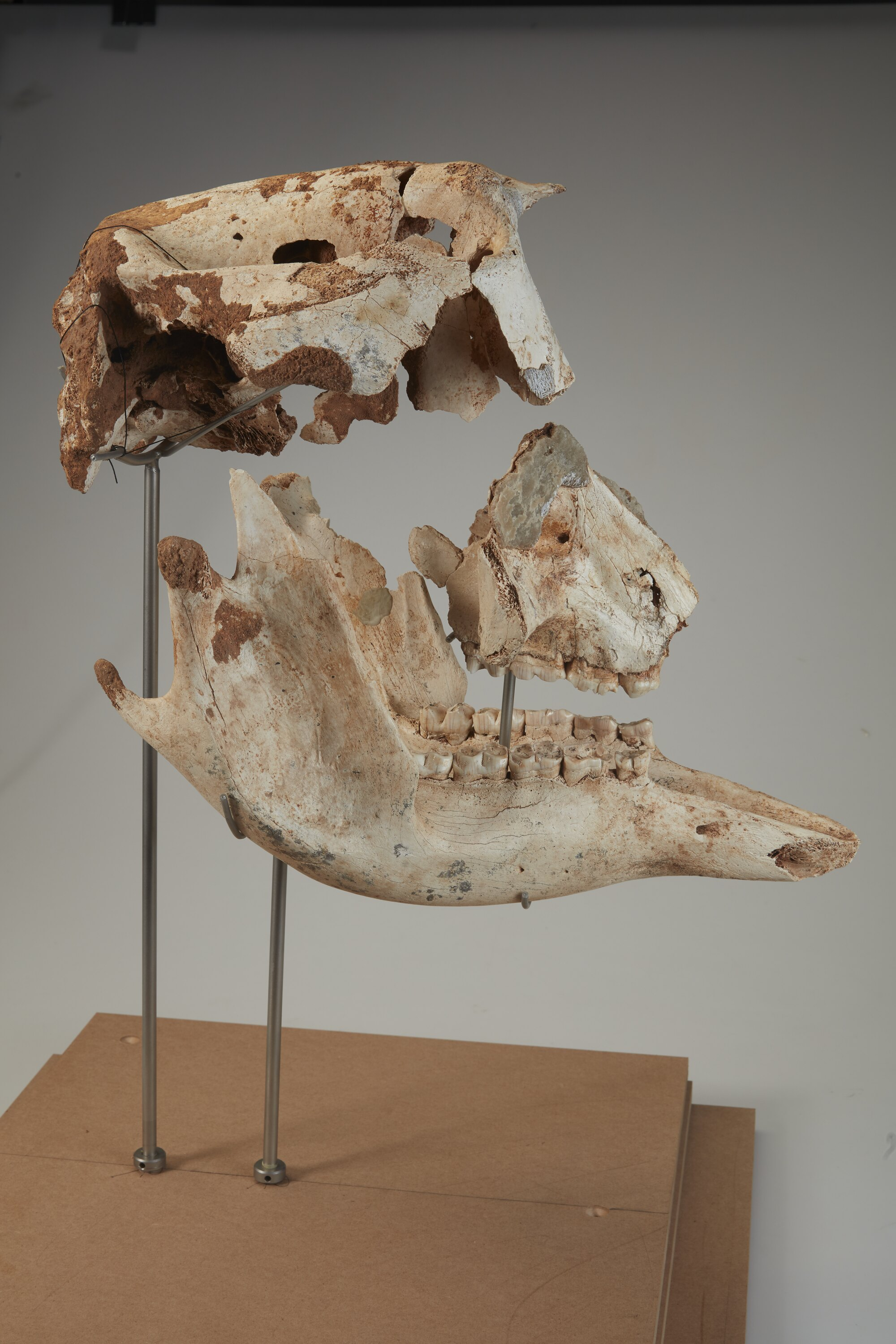
- Partial skull and mandibles of Palorchestes azael
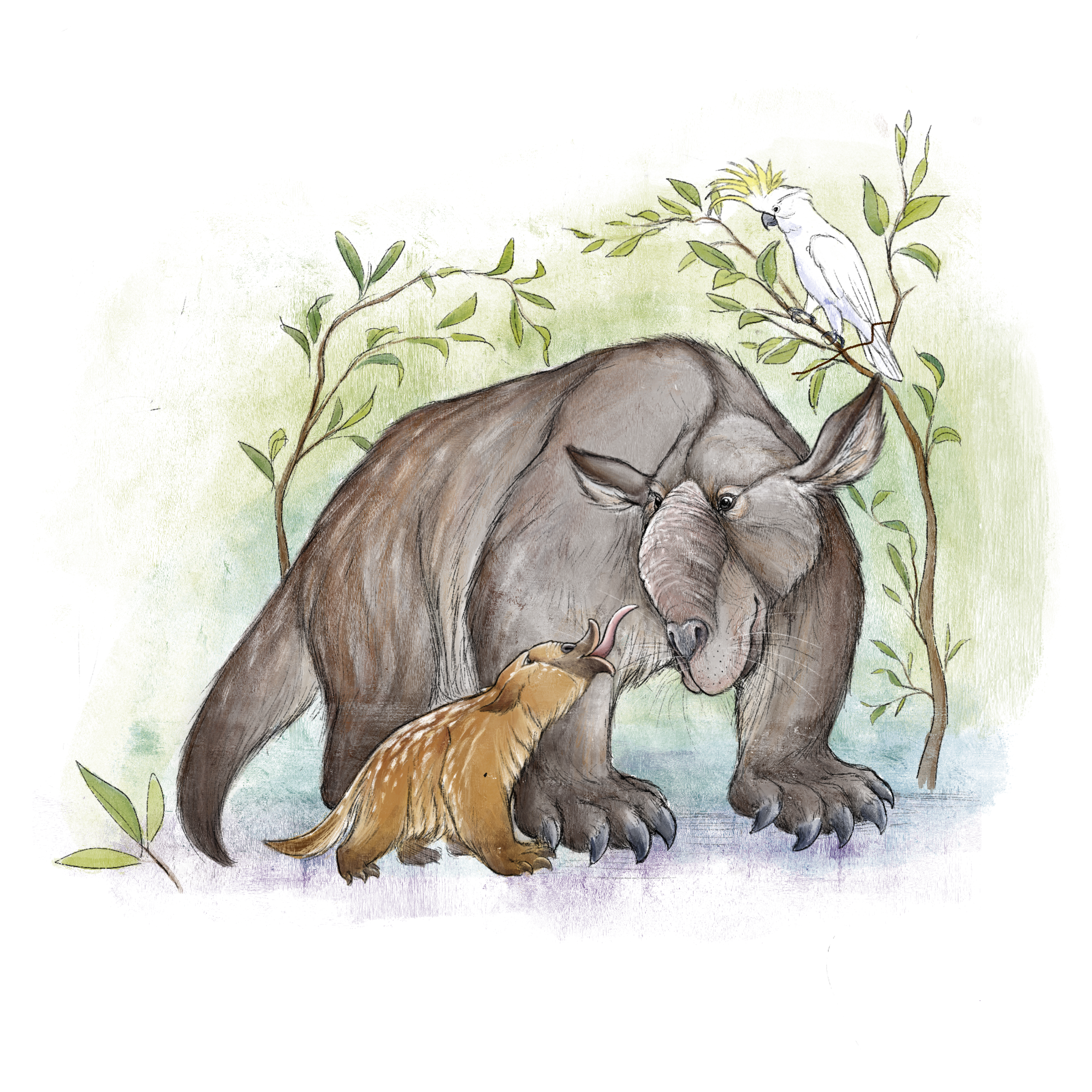
- Life restoration of an adult and juvenile

Scientific classification
- Kingdom: Animalia
- Phylum: Chordata
- Class: Mammalia
- Infraclass: Marsupialia
- Order: Diprotodontia
- Family: †Palorchestidae
- Genus: †Palorchestes; Owen, 1873

Type species
- †Palorchestes azael Owen, 1873

Other species
- †P. anulus Black 1997; †P. painei Woodburne, 1967; †P. parvus De Vis, 1895; †P. pickeringi Piper, 2005; †P. selestiae Mackness, 1995

= Palorchestes =

Palorchestes Temporal range: Miocene–Late Pleistocene

Extinct genus of marsupial

Palorchestes ("ancient leaper") is an extinct genus of large terrestrial, herbivorous Australian marsupial of the family Palorchestidae, living from the Miocene through to the Late Pleistocene. Like other palorchestids, it had highly retracted nasal region suggesting that it had a prehensile lip, as well as highly unusual clawed forelimbs that were used to grasp vegetation.

== Taxonomy ==
The generic name was coined in 1873 by anatomist Richard Owen, who first found what he thought was the fragmentary jaw of a prehistoric kangaroo and derived the name from ancient Greek terms for "ancient" and "leaper". Despite Owen explicitly stating the etymology of the name in his description, palaeontologist Harold Fletcher published a translation as "the ancient dancer" in 1945. When more postcranial elements were found, Palorchestes was realized as not a macropod, but a diprotodontid. Owen's description as a giant kangaroo was revised in 1958 by Jack T. Woods of the Queensland Museum, allying the genus to the Diprotodontia order.

Another genus is probably ancestral to these species, thus named Propalorchestes; it shared some characteristics of the molars, but had shorter jaws and therefore snout.

The genus is represented in the fossil record by five or six species,

- †Palorchestes Owen, 1873

- †P. anulus Black 1997
- †P. azael Owen, 1873
- †P. painei Woodburne, 1967
- †P. parvus De Vis, 1895
- †P. pickeringi Piper, 2005
- †P. selestiae Mackness, 1995

The fossil dentary of a young adult found in Pleistocene deposits in the Darling Downs region of southeast Queensland, although limited by the rarity of specimens and comparable remains of the genus, was distinguishable from P. azael, P. parvus, and P. painei. The specimen provides evidence of sympatry with another species of the genus, rather than the apparent sequence of form and size from the mid-Miocene to recent era, and may represent a new species or sexual dimorphism in a smaller species.

The genus was allied to other diprotodontid genera, Ngapakaldia and Pitikantia, firstly recognised as a subfamily Palorchestinae (Stirton, 1967), later elevated to familial status with the order (Archer and Bartholomai, 1978).

== Description ==
Complete skull diagram

Palorchestes azael, was similar in size to a horse, being around 2.5 m (8.2 ft) in length, with quantitative body mass estimates based on humerus and femur bones indicating its body mass could well have exceeded 1,000 kg (2,200 lb). Palorchestes species had four powerful legs, with the front legs bearing large claws, similar to those of a koala, which they probably used to pull down leaves and strip the bark from trees. The long symphysis at the lower jaw of all Palorchestes species indicates that their tongues were long and protrusible, like that of a giraffe. The retracted nasal opening has led to proposals that the species had a short proboscis/trunk, leading to the nickname of the "marsupial tapir". However, a recent comprehensive review of the cranial morphology of various Palorchestes species and the related genus of Propalorchestes showed strong support for well-developed prehensile lips, rather than a tapir-like proboscis.

A structural detail of the first molar is regarded as characteristic of this genus, the development of a midlink at the crown, distinguishing it from the earlier Propalorchestes and other Miocene genera. The dentition and morphological features of the genus indicate they browsed for plant material such as shrubs and roots.

Following Owen and other workers' conceptions as a macropidid, a very large ancestor of the modern kangaroos, the Australian Museum in Sydney commissioned a model reconstruction that was exhibited during the early decades of the 20th century. A general-interest story with a photographs and details describing the process of the construction, reproducing a "giant kangaroo" that could attain 10 ft in height, was published in the magazine of the museum. Revisions to size and form of the genus, still as a large kangaroo, reduced its estimated size and posture in the 1940s, and a new model was completed in 1945. When Jack Woods presented his evidence of its relationship to the diprotodont, the directors of the national museum ordered their reconstruction to be destroyed. Mike Archer reports that the model is rumoured to be buried in the grounds of Sydney's Centennial Park.

The rostrum of the genus was discussed by Alan Bartholomai in 1978, altering again the conception of the animals' appearance in a visual reconstruction of P. painei. An illustration by Peter Schouten was published by the Australian Museum, adopting the tapir-like model that became widely popularised. The later conception of an animal more like a ground sloth was produced by Anne Musser in the early 21st century.

Ancient rock art depicting animals such as thylacines, thought to have become extinct on the mainland, has been interpreted to include depictions of Palochestes; the outline of the painting an animal resembles the later ground sloth model in the reconstruction by Musser and others.

== Distribution and habitat ==
Specimens of Palorchestes have been found at sites in the east of the Australian continent (Sahul at the time). The locations of specimens diagnosed as the species number over 30 sites, dated as Pliocene and Pleistocene, and most well represented by the later species P. azael. Remains of P. azael have been found at the Naracoorte Caves fossil site in Australia. The genus is represented in the biostratigraphy of the Riversleigh mammal sites, becoming abundant in the more recently dated deposits, which along with other diprotodontoid taxa provides evidence that may be correlated to similar analysis of other sites in Australia and elsewhere. Four Palorchestes skulls have been identified at Alcoota in Central Australia.

== Paleobiology ==
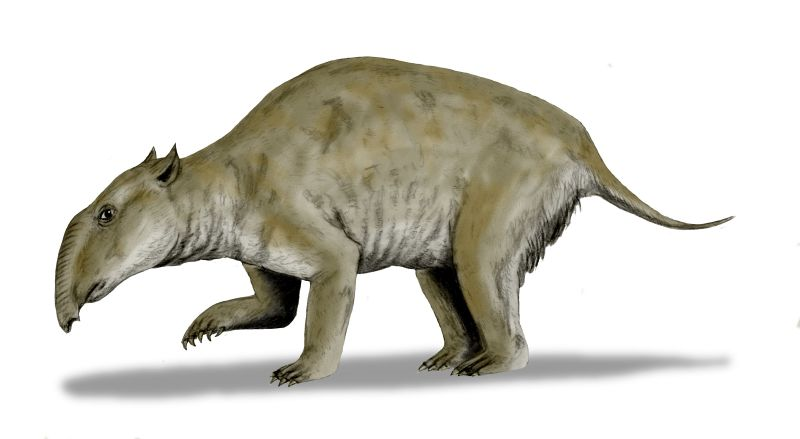
An outdated reconstruction of P. azael with a trunk

The morphology of the skull, teeth, and dental microwear analysis suggest that Palorchestes was a selective browser. The unusual morphology of palorchestids makes their ecology difficult to interpret. The elbow of Palorchestes had an unusually limited range of motion, which means that the forelimbs would have sprawled when the animal was walking quadrupedally. Palorchestes likely used its forelimbs to attain foliage, using them to tear vegetation or to dig in a hook-and-pull fashion, and may have fed in a bipedal posture. Due to the extreme rarity of its remains, some authors have interpreted it as a solitary animal that had large ranges and slow reproductive rates.

Extremely small eye sockets suggest very limited vision, and so Palorchestes might have relied primarily upon olfaction.

== Sources ==
- Cox, Barry; Palmer, Douglas (1999). The Simon & Schuster Encyclopedia of Dinosaurs & Prehistoric Creatures: A Visual Who's who of Prehistoric Life. Simon & Schuster. ISBN 978-0-684-86411-2.
