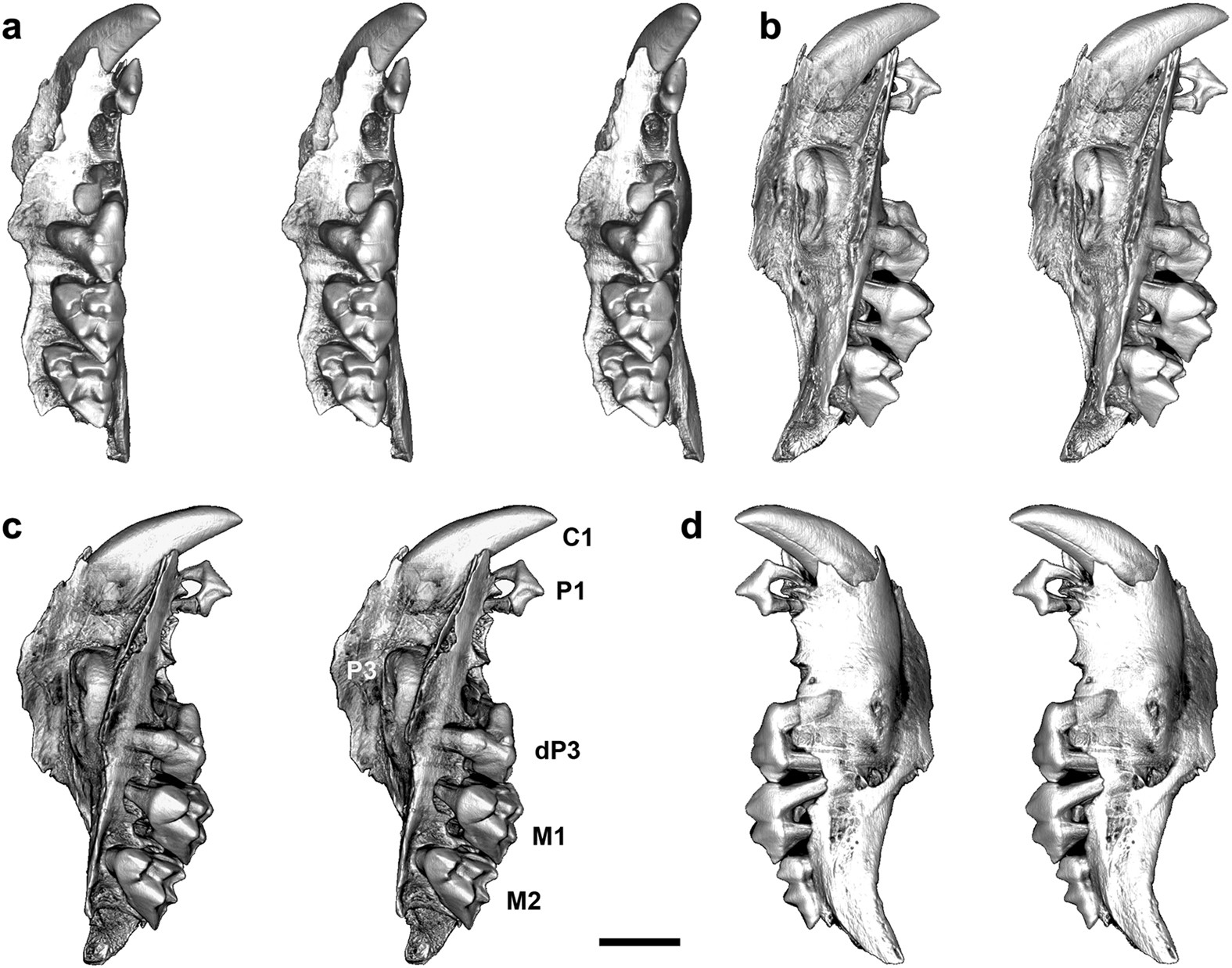
- Left maxilla of M. mirabilis (QM F57925)

Scientific classification
- Kingdom: Animalia
- Phylum: Chordata
- Class: Mammalia
- Infraclass: Marsupialia
- Order: Dasyuromorphia
- Family: †Malleodectidae; Archer et al., 2016
- Genus: †Malleodectes; Arena et al., 2011

Type species
- Malleodectes mirabilis Arena et al. 2011

Species
- M. arenai Churchill et al. 2025; M. mirabilis Arena et al. 2011; M. moenia Arena et al. 2011; M.? wentworthi Churchill et al. 2023

= Malleodectes =

Malleodectes Temporal range: Middle Miocene–Late Miocene

Extinct genus of marsupials

Malleodectes is an extinct genus of unusual marsupial, first discovered in 2011 at Riversleigh, Queensland, Australia.

== Taxonomy ==
The description of the new genus and two species, was published in 2011, based on fossilised type material discovered at a Riversleigh site. The type species is named Malleodectes mirabilis and the second description published as Malleodectes moenia; their generic epithet combines terms derived from the Latin, malleo meaning hammer, and Ancient Greek, dectes for biter, in reference to the unusual dentition.

Malleodectes was classified as the sole genus of Malleodectidae in a 2016 revision, with the family allied to Dasyuromorphia. A 2025 study assigned the genus Barinya and, tentatively, the new genus Weirdodectes to the family Malleodectidae.

== Description ==
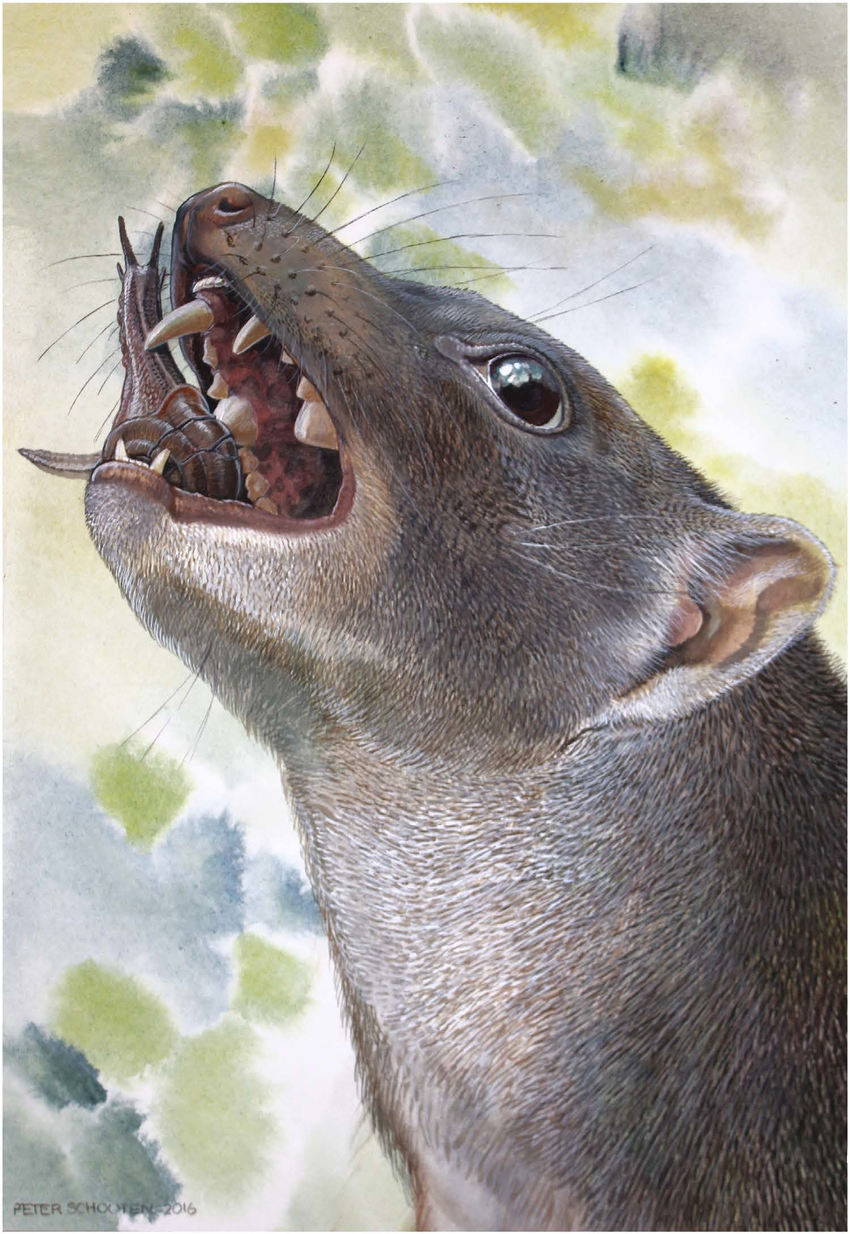
Life restoration of M. mirabilis feeding on land snail

A marsupial with highly specialised dentition, an enlarged premolar with a flattened profile used to hammer open the shells of snails found in its wet forested environment. This tooth was compared by the authors to a genus of skinks, Cyclodomorphus, and concluded this represented evolutionary convergence with the modern skinks that have similar adaptation to their diet of snails; the authors gave a generalised description of this unusual animal as a "marsupial-skink". Scott Hocknull from the Queensland Museum noticed similarities to the modern pink-tongued skink (Cyclodomorphus gerrardii), a reptile specialised for eating snails. This suggests that Malleodectes was a specialised snail hunter. It could grow as large as a ferret, and lived in the Miocene, 15 million years ago.

A leading author on the research and description of the species, professor Michael Archer, said of the type species, "Malleodectes mirabilis was a bizarre mammal, as strange in its own way as a koala or kangaroo …,". Fossil material associated with genus had been collected by workers at Riversleigh in the years leading to the crucial discovery of a juvenile jaw containing unerupted adult teeth. The juvenile specimen was found at a cave floor deposit with the remains of other animals, the AL90 site, and postulated to have fallen from its mother into a cave that once existed in the limestone formation.
