= Ilaria =

Ilaria Temporal range: Late Oligocene

Scientific classification
- Kingdom: Animalia
- Phylum: Chordata
- Class: Mammalia
- Infraclass: Marsupialia
- Order: Diprotodontia
- Family: †Ilariidae
- Genus: †Ilaria; Tedford & Woodburne, 1987

Species
- I. illumidens; I. lawsoni

Extinct genus of marsupials

Ilaria (lit. 'strange') is an extinct genus of marsupial of the family Ilariidae, dating from the Late Oligocene of South Australia. Its diet consisted of leaves.
