= Propalorchestes =

Propalorchestes Temporal range: Miocene
- Skull of Propalorchetes novaculacephalus

Scientific classification
- Kingdom: Animalia
- Phylum: Chordata
- Class: Mammalia
- Infraclass: Marsupialia
- Order: Diprotodontia
- Family: †Palorchestidae
- Genus: †Propalorchestes; Murray, 1987

Type species
- Propalorchestes novaculacephalus Murray, 1986

Extinct genus of marsupials

Propalorchestes is a fossil genus of palorchestid marsupial that existed in Australia during the Miocene epoch.

== Overview ==
The type species is Propalorchestes novaculacephalus. The genus is probably ancestral to Palorchestes and resembles Ngapakaldia, another palorchestid that existed during the Miocene epoch. Evidence for the transitional connection between earlier and later phylogenies was discovered amongst the Riversleigh fauna, including a more complete maxilla within the unworn dentition of a juvenile.

The marsupial appears to have existed from the early to mid Miocene in material obtained in north-eastern Queensland, in fossil deposits at Riversleigh.

A largely complete cranium, providing anatomical evidence of the rostral morphology that distinguished the lineage of Propalorchestes and Palorchestes from similar groups of the diprotodont order of marsupials. The dentition of the specimen links the form of molars found in the early wynyardiids with those of the palorchestids.

The type species and genus were named in 1986 by Peter F. Murray, conducting palaeontological research at the Northern Territory Museum of Arts and Sciences, along with a second and possible third species proposed in 1990.

- Propalorchestes novaculacephalus Murray, 1986
- Propalorchestes ponticulus Murray, 1990

The genus name is Latinised Greek, combining pro with Palorchestes to indicate its ancestral position to that genus. Murray repeats the translation of Richard Owen's genus as "old dancer" with the contemporary reconception as a "marsupial tapir", although Owen gave his own etymology as a combination of "ancient" and "leaper" to the fossil fragments he thought were of a giant kangaroo.

== Description ==
Based on calculations derived from the circumference of its humerus, Propalorchestes had a body mass of approximately 155 kg.
