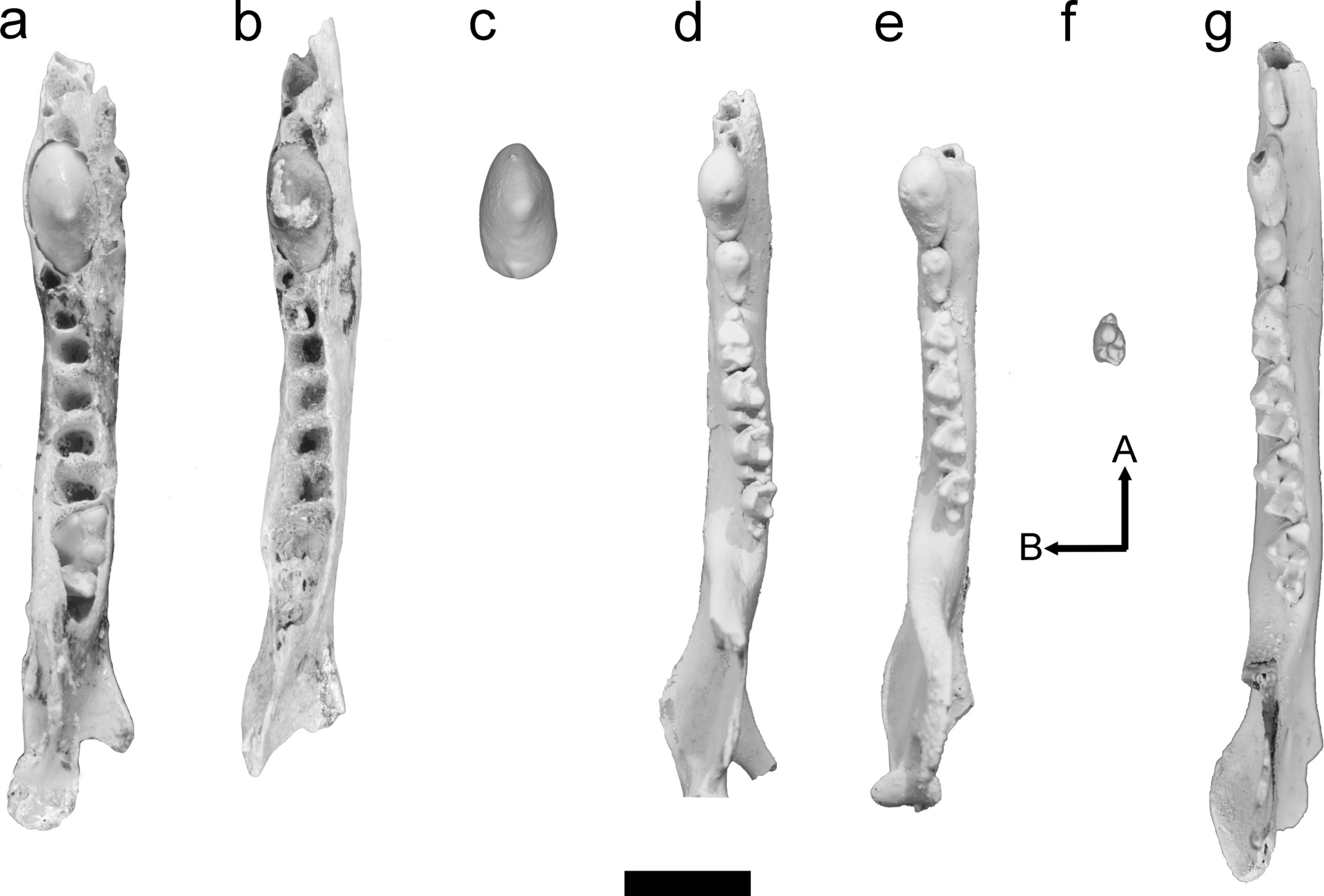
- Lower dentition (to scale) of several malleodectid species

Scientific classification
- Kingdom: Animalia
- Phylum: Chordata
- Class: Mammalia
- Infraclass: Marsupialia
- Order: Dasyuromorphia
- Family: †Malleodectidae; Archer et al., 2016

Subgroups
- †Protamalleus; †Weirdodectes; †Barinyainae Wroe, 1999; †Barinya; †Malleodectinae Churchill, Archer & Hand, 2025; †Chitinodectes; †Exosmachus; †Malleodectes

= Malleodectidae =

Malleodectidae Temporal range: Late Oligocene–Late Miocene

Extinct order of marsupial mammals

Malleodectidae is an extinct family of marsupials within the order Dasyuromorphia. It was named by Archer and colleagues in 2016 following the discovery of additional fossils of the type genus Malleodectes. The group is divided into two subfamilies—Barinyainae and Malleodectinae. The group first appeared during the Late Oligocene and disappeared during the Late Miocene.
