= Muramura =

Muramura Temporal range: Late Oligocene-Pliocene

Scientific classification
- Kingdom: Animalia
- Phylum: Chordata
- Class: Mammalia
- Infraclass: Marsupialia
- Order: Diprotodontia
- Family: †Wynyardiidae
- Genus: †Muramura; Pledge, 1987

Species
- M. williamsi

Extinct genus of marsupials

Muramura williamsi is an extinct Australian wynardiid marsupial, related to the modern koala and wombat. Around the size of a dog at 65 cm (26 in) in length, it was a herbivore. Fossils range in age from the Late Oligocene to the Pliocene in age.
