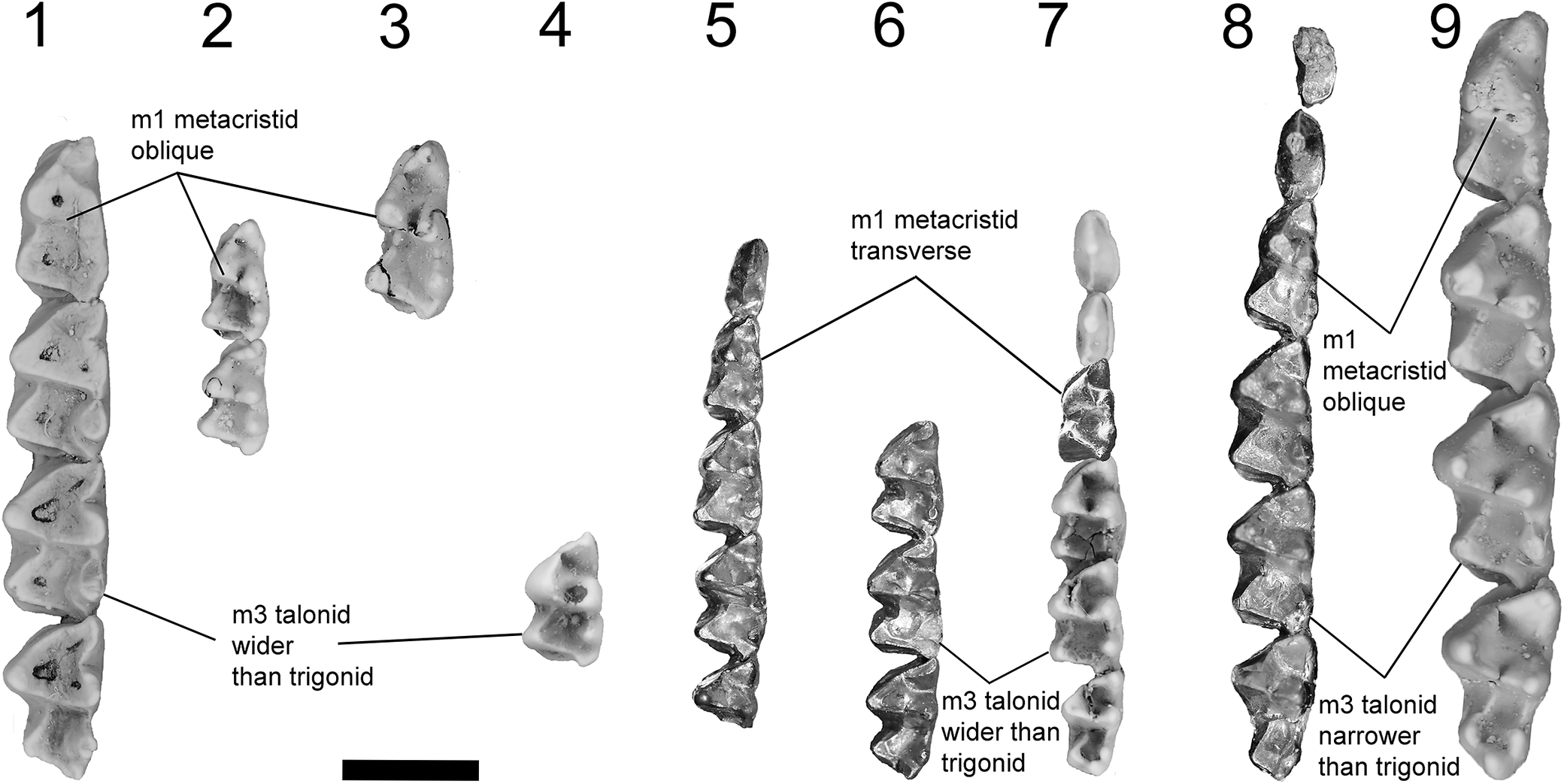
- Lower dentition of all keeunamorphian species (1–8), compared to Joculusium muizoni (8) and Barinya wangala (9)

Scientific classification
- Kingdom: Animalia
- Phylum: Chordata
- Class: Mammalia
- Infraclass: Marsupialia
- Superorder: Australidelphia
- Order: †Keeunamorphia; Churchill et al., 2026

Subgroups
- †Ankotarinja; †Djarthia; †Keeunidae; †Keeuna; †Phantasmodon

= Keeunamorphia =

Keeunamorphians Temporal range: Early Eocene–Early Miocene

Extinct order of marsupial mammals

Keeunamorphia is an extinct order of marsupials within the superorder Australidelphia. The clade was defined in 2026 following the discovery of several marsupial fossils from the Early Miocene Riversleigh World Heritage Area of Australia. Members of this group can be distinguished from all other marsupials by a unique combination of anatomical features of the dentition. Keeunamorphians include some of the oldest marsupials known in Australia.
