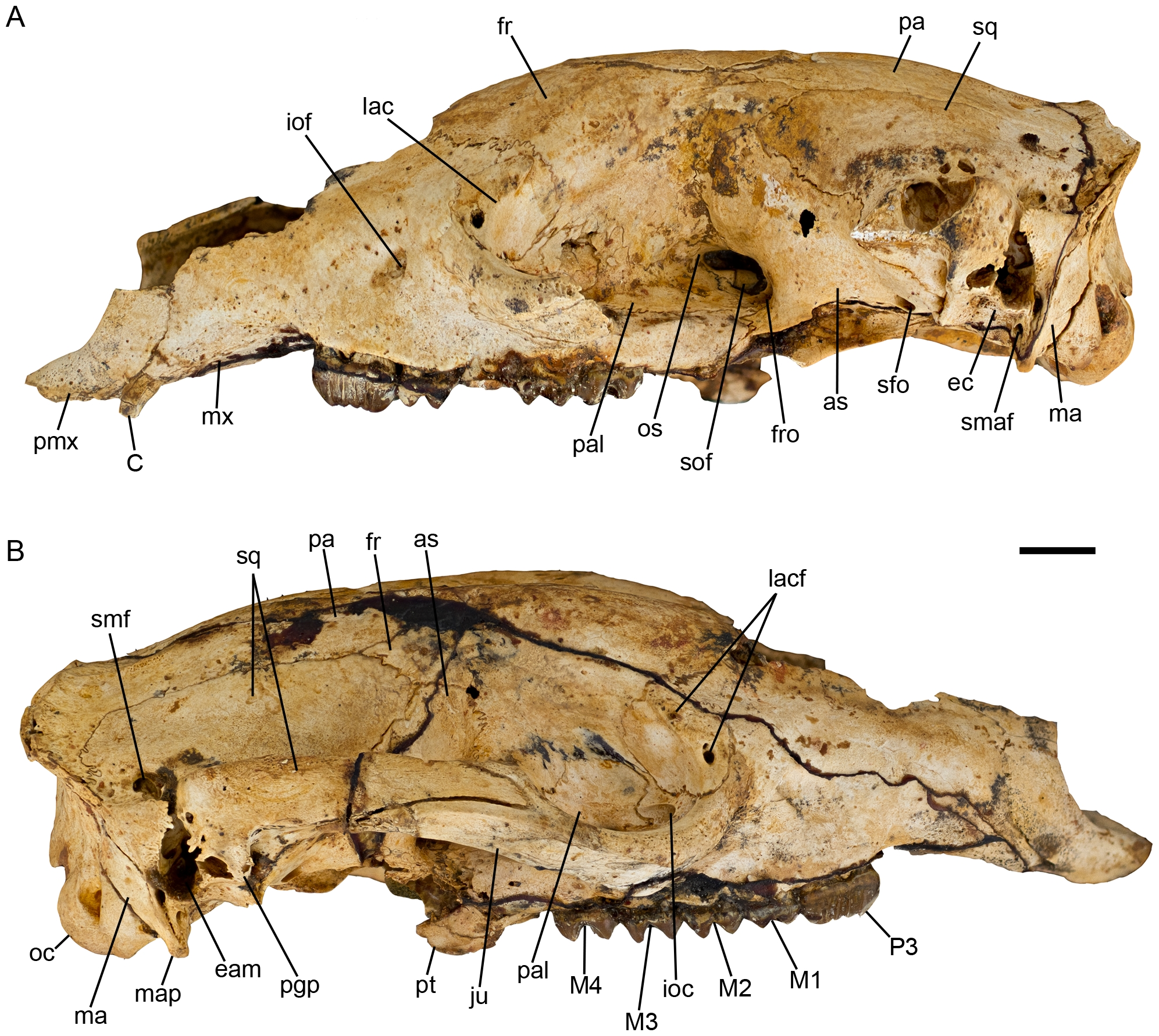
- Holotype skull of Balbaroo nalima

Scientific classification
- Kingdom: Animalia
- Phylum: Chordata
- Class: Mammalia
- Infraclass: Marsupialia
- Order: Diprotodontia
- Family: †Balbaridae
- Genus: †Balbaroo; Flannery, Archer & Plane, 1982

Type species
- †Balbaroo camfieldensis Flannery, Archer & Plane, 1982

Other species
- †B. fangaroo Cooke, 2000; †B. gregoriensis Flannery, Archer & Plane, 1982; †B. nalima Black et al, 2014

Synonyms
- Nambaroo bullockensis Schwartz & Megirian, 2004

= Balbaroo =

Balbaroo Temporal range: Late Oligocene–Middle Miocene

Extinct genus of marsupials

Balbaroo is an extinct genus of basal quadrupedal macropodiform marsupials that once lived in Australia during the Late Oligocene to the Middle Miocene. Known primarily from the Riversleigh World Heritage Area in Queensland, and the Camfield Beds of the Northern Territory, Balbaroo species are considered part of the family Balbaridae, which represents an early branch of kangaroo evolution. Unlike modern kangaroos, members of the Balbaroo genus were quadrupedal browsers, adapted to dense forest environments. Four species are currently recognised, B. camfieldensis, B. fangaroo, B. gregoriensis, and B. nalima.

== Taxonomy ==
The genus was erected in 1982 to describe a new species of early marsupials, Balbaroo camfieldensis. Since then, it has been determined that members of the genus possessed sharp canines. Despite the sharp canines, the presence of low-crowned bilophodont molars seems to indicate an herbivorous diet.
