= Ankotarinja =

In Australian Aboriginal religion and mythology, Ankotarinja is the first man, also called the Dreaming Man. His myth belonged to a small band of Arrernte people, known as the Ngala-Mbitjana people. They were heirs to Ankotarinja's exploits at the time of the Dreaming, performing his ceremonies and initiating their young iliara (novice) into his totemic lodge. They kept alive the memory of his world-creating endeavors. Ankotarinja's birthplace is a creek-bed near Ankota (vicinity of Mount Solitaire).
