= Chulpasia =

Chulpasia Temporal range: Early Eocene (Itaboraian) ~48 Ma

Scientific classification
- Domain: Eukaryota
- Kingdom: Animalia
- Phylum: Chordata
- Class: Mammalia
- Order: †Polydolopimorphia
- Subfamily: †Chulpasiinae
- Genus: †Chulpasia; Crochet & Sigé, 1993

Type species
- †Chulpasia mattaueri

Extinct genus of marsupials

Chulpasia is an extinct genus of Eocene marsupial related to today's shrew opossums. It was a small animal, about 20 centimetres (7.9 in) long, with an omnivorous diet. Its diet probably included seeds, small fruits, and insects. Fossils were found in the Muñani Formation in present-day Peru.

== Australian conundrum ==
In 2009 Bernard Sigé et al. described a marsupial fossil found on the Eocene Murgon fossil site, Queensland. Referring to the specimen as Chulpasia jimthorselli, they exhibited this find as an example of Gondwanan faunal interchange between South America and Australia during the early Paleogene.

However, more recent re-evaluations showcase that this specimen has nothing referrable to Chulpasia or any of its close relatives, and instead identified it as a metatherian incertae sedis. For now, the genus, as well as paucituberculates in general, remain exclusively South American.
