= Kuterintja =

Kuterintja Temporal range: Late Oligocene

Scientific classification
- Kingdom: Animalia
- Phylum: Chordata
- Class: Mammalia
- Infraclass: Marsupialia
- Order: Diprotodontia
- Family: †Ilariidae
- Genus: †Kuterintja; Pledge, 1987
- Species: †K. ngama

Binomial name
- †Kuterintja ngama Pledge, 1987

Extinct genus of marsupials

Kuterintja is an extinct genus of marsupial of the family Ilariidae. Only one species has been described, Kuterintja ngama, from Late Oligocene of Australia.
