= Tingamarra =

Tingamarra Temporal range: Early Eocene

Scientific classification
- Kingdom: Animalia
- Phylum: Chordata
- Class: Mammalia
- Subclass: Theria
- Genus: †Tingamarra; Godthelp et al., 1992
- Species: †T. porterorum

Binomial name
- †Tingamarra porterorum Godthelp et al., 1992

Extinct genus of mammals

Tingamarra is an extinct genus of mammals from Australia. Its age, lifestyle, and relationships remain controversial.

== Discovery ==
Tingamarra was discovered in 1987, when a single tooth was found at the Murgon fossil site in south-eastern Queensland. An ankle bone and an ear bone found at Murgon may also belong to this animal.

== Material ==
Holotype: QMF20564, isolated right lower molar, probably an M2 or M3.

== Diagnosis ==
1. Non-twinned hypoconulid and entoconid.
2. Lack of a well developed buccal postcingulid.
3. Lack of anteroposteriorly compressed trigonid.
4. Broadly open trigonid.
5. Lingually situated paraconid that is also well anterior to the protoconid.

== Assumed lifestyle ==
Tingamarra is believed to be a small (about 20 cm from head to tail) ground-dwelling mammal that ate insects and fruit.

== Scientific significance ==
The age of Murgon fossils was determined as the early Eocene.

By the shape of the found tooth, Tingamarra was first classified as a condylarth. This is a primitive order of mammals which are ancestral to modern ungulates. If this interpretation is correct, Tingamarra appears to be the only land-based placental mammal to have arrived to Australia before about 8 million years ago. The only other placental mammals in Australia that arrived before humans are rodents and bats.

Most Australian mammals are marsupials instead. Before Tingamarra was found, it was hypothesised that marsupials had done well in Australia only because for many millions of years they had no placentals to compete with.

However, both the age and placental nature of Tingamarra were subsequently challenged by other researchers. Woodburne et al. argued that: 1) the true age of Murgon fossil site is the late Oligocene, and 2) that indeed neither shape nor microstructure of the tooth do not allow to distinguish whether Tingamarra was marsupial or placental. Then Rose concluded that at present there is no undoubted evidence to change the established views.
