= Ganawamaya =

Ganawamaya Temporal range: Late Oligocene–Middle Miocene

Scientific classification
- Kingdom: Animalia
- Phylum: Chordata
- Class: Mammalia
- Infraclass: Marsupialia
- Order: Diprotodontia
- Family: †Balbaridae
- Genus: †Ganawamaya; Cooke, 1992

Type species
- †Ganawamaya acris Cooke, 1992

Other species
- †G. aediculis Cooke, 1992; †G. gillespieae Kear et al., 2007; †G. couperi Cooke, 1997

Synonyms
- Ganawamaya ornata Cooke, 1992; Nambaroo gillespieae Kear et al., 2007; Nambaroo couperi Cooke, 1997

Extinct genus of marsupials

Ganawamaya is an extinct genus of quadrupedal kangaroos that lived in Australia. Its fossils have been found in various Oligocene and Miocene deposits throughout South Australia and Queensland. Four species are currently recognised, G. acris , G. aediculis, G. gillespieae, and G. couperi.

== Palaeobiology ==
=== Palaeoecology ===
Craniodental measurements indicate that both G. aediculis and G. acris were folivorous browsers.
