= Murgon fossil site =

Coordinates: 26°14′S 151°57′E

The Murgon fossil site is a paleontological site of early Eocene age in south-eastern Queensland, Australia. It lies near the town of Murgon, some 270 km north-west of Brisbane. The Murgon site is important as the only site on the continent with a diverse range of vertebrate fossils dating from the early Paleogene Period (55 million years ago, only 11 million years after the extinction of the non-avian dinosaurs), making it a crucial period in mammal evolution. It is also important in demonstrating Australia's Gondwanan links with South America in the form of similar fossils from the two continents.

== Geology ==
Volcanic rock which has been estimated to be 40 million years old overlays the site. Therefore, the Murgon fossils must be older than this.

The site is mostly clay which was laid down in a lake which formed in a volcanic crater.

== Fossil fauna ==
The fossil fauna reported from Murgon is referred to as the Tingamarra fauna. The most common fossil at the site are of crocodiles and giant trionychidae turtles which have become extinct in Australia. Fossils from Murgon include the world's oldest songbirds, the oldest Australian marsupials, and the only fossils of leiopelmatid frogs outside of the Saint Bathans Fauna. Vertebrae fossils recovered from the site have been tentatively attributed to salamanders, though their identity remains disputed. Evidence of the Gondwanan connection comes with the appearance of a madstoiid snake in the genus Alamitophis, also found in Argentina, and of microbiotheriid marsupials, otherwise only known from South America. The earliest Australian frog fossil was found there.

Other notable examples of the Tingamarra fauna from Murgon are:

- Thylacotinga bartholomaii – a strange marsupial omnivore
- Tingamarra porterorum – possibly Australia's oldest placental land mammal, though not without controversy
- Australonycteris clarkae – Australia’s earliest known bat species. Estimated to be 55 million years old, this is one of the oldest bat fossils ever to be found. The early bat discovery indicates the group was widespread shortly after its appearance in the fossil record.
- A fossil once referred to the genus Chulpasia, now identified as some unspecified metatherian.
- Archaeonothos, a strange carnivorous metatherian.

Because of closer links between current South American species than ancient Australian families, it has been hypothesised that there must have been large exchanges of species between continents when they were once linked by Antarctica.

After the discoveries at this site, no mammalian fossils have been identified in the following 30 million years.

== See also ==
- List of fossil sites
