= Marlu =

Marlu Temporal range: Late Oligocene - Middle Miocene

Scientific classification
- Kingdom: Animalia
- Phylum: Chordata
- Class: Mammalia
- Infraclass: Marsupialia
- Order: Diprotodontia
- Family: Pseudocheiridae
- Genus: †Marlu; Woodburne et al., 1987

Species
- Marlu kutjamarpensis Marlu karya Marlu sykes Marlu praecursor Marlu ampelos

Extinct genus of marsupials

Marlu is an extinct genus of Pseudocheiridae from the Oligocene–Miocene of Australia. It consists of five species found at various sites in Australia. M. kutjamarpensis, M. karya, M. sykes and M. ampelos from the Miocene in the Kutjamarpu Local Fauna (Leaf Locality) in Queensland and from the Late Oligocene, M. praecursor from the Wadikali Local Fauna in northern South Australia.
