= Ilariidae =

Scientific classification
- Kingdom: Animalia
- Phylum: Chordata
- Class: Mammalia
- Infraclass: Marsupialia
- Order: Diprotodontia
- Infraorder: Vombatomorphia
- Family: †Ilariidae; Tedford & Woodburne, 1987

Genera
- †Ilaria †Kuterintja

Extinct family of marsupials

Ilariidae is a family of extinct vombatiform marsupials. Most ilariids are found in the middle Tertiary faunal assemblages of South Australia. Ilaria illumidens is the best-preserved representative of this extinct clade.

The only known specimen of Ilaria illumidens was found in the Namba Formation of Late Oligocene age, at Lake Pinpa, South Australia. The material consists of a partial cranium and mandibular fragments with most of the dentition, together with parts of the postcranial skeleton. The other species in this family are known from a few jaw fragments and intact molars attached; they are categorised in a separate family because their teeth structure is unique among Diprotodontia, in having a complicated folding pattern. Ilariids are thought to be the largest marsupials of their time in the Lake Eyre and Tarkarooloo basin.
