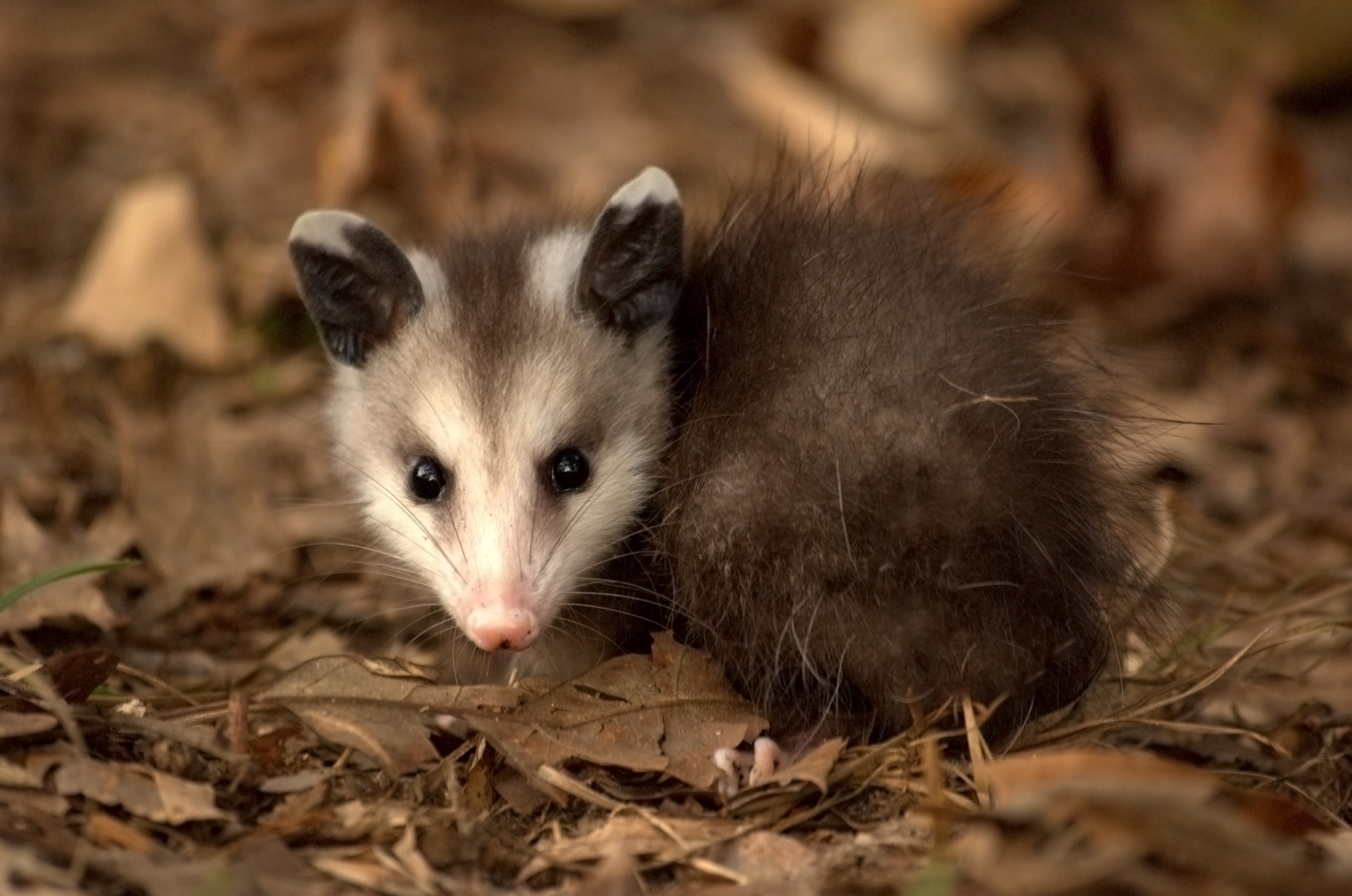
- A Virginia opossum

Scientific classification
- Kingdom: Animalia
- Phylum: Chordata
- Class: Mammalia
- Infraclass: Marsupialia
- Superorder: Ameridelphia

Subgroups
- Didelphimorphia; Paucituberculata

= Ameridelphia =

Superorder of marsupials

Ameridelphia is traditionally a superorder that includes all marsupials living in the Americas except for the monito del monte (Dromiciops). It is now regarded as a paraphyletic group.

== Orders ==
The orders within this group are listed below:

- Order Didelphimorphia (108 species)
  - Family Didelphidae: opossums
- Order Paucituberculata (7 species)
  - Family Caenolestidae: shrew opossums

== Evolution and phylogenetics ==
Modern marsupials are now understood to be an originally South American lineage that later reached Australia and diversified there in a massive adaptive radiation. Molecular data, including analysis of retrotransposon insertion sites in the nuclear DNA of a variety of marsupials, and the fossil evidence indicate that Ameridelphia might best be understood as an evolutionary grade. Since Didelphimorphia appears to be the basal marsupial group, it and Paucituberculata do not seem to be closest relatives. Meanwhile, the unranked clade Eomarsupialia has been proposed as the name for the Australian marsupials (Australidelphia minus Microbiotheria, of which Dromiciops is the only survivor), which in all probability derive from a single colonization out of South America via Antarctica.
