= Namilamadeta =

Namilamadeta Temporal range: Late Oligocene

Scientific classification
- Kingdom: Animalia
- Phylum: Chordata
- Class: Mammalia
- Infraclass: Marsupialia
- Order: Diprotodontia
- Family: †Wynyardiidae
- Genus: †Namilamadeta; Rich & Archer, 1979

Type species
- †Namilamadeta snideri Rich & Archer, 1979

Other species
- †N. albivenator Pledge, 2005; †N. crassirostrum Pledge, 2005; †N. superior Pledge, 2005

Extinct genus of marsupials

Namilamadeta (from Australian Indigenous languages namilama "alter/change" and deta "teeth") is an extinct genus of herbivorous marsupial from Australia that was around the size of a dog.
