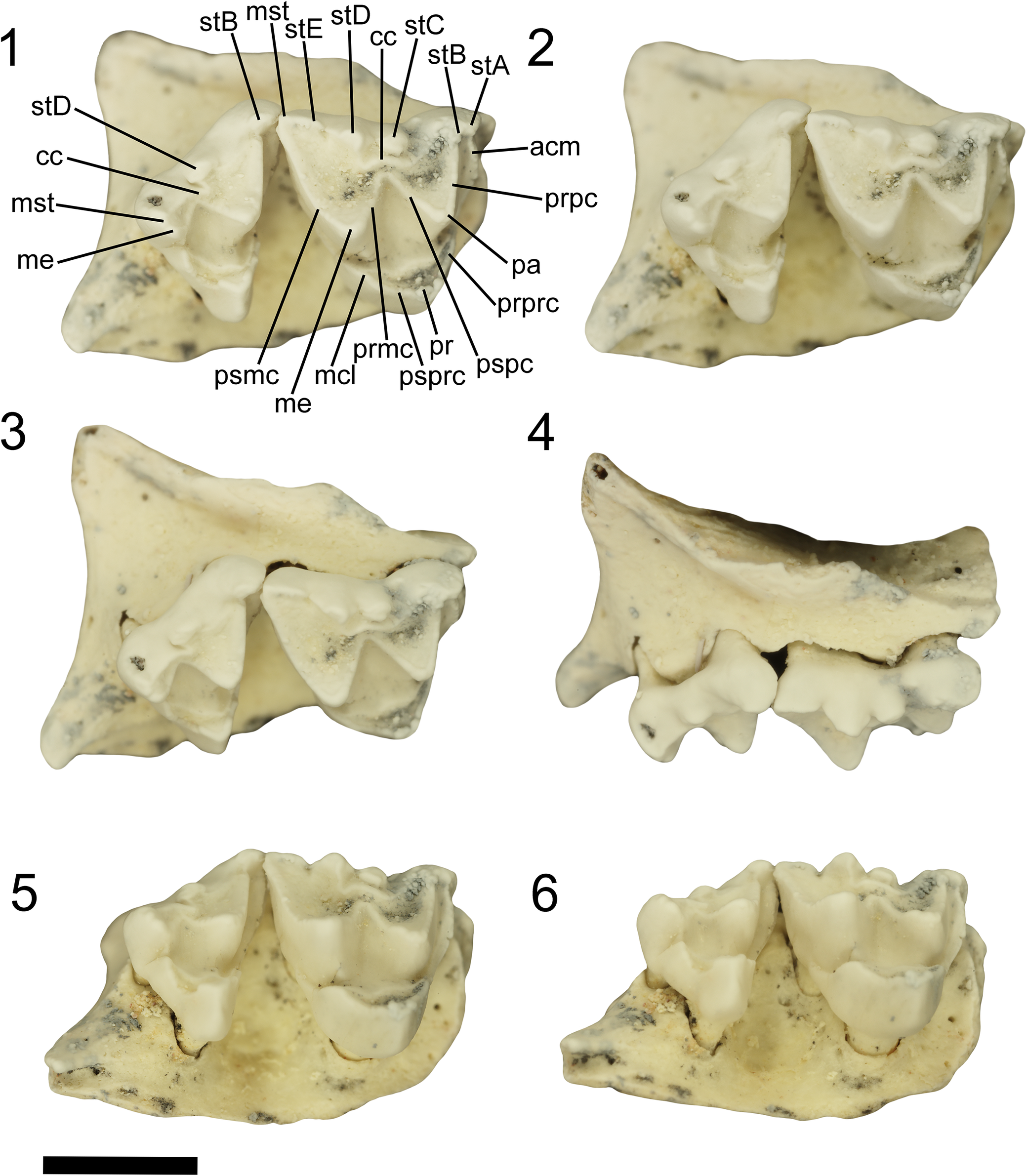
- Holotype maxilla of P. travouilloni

Scientific classification
- Kingdom: Animalia
- Phylum: Chordata
- Class: Mammalia
- Infraclass: Marsupialia
- Order: †Keeunamorphia
- Family: †Keeunidae
- Genus: †Phantasmodon; Churchill et al., 2026

Type species
- †Phantasmodon travouilloni Churchill et al., 2026

Other species
- †Phantasmodon minuferox Churchill et al., 2026

= Phantasmodon =

Phantasmodon Temporal range: Early Miocene

Genus of extinct marsupials

Phantasmodon (lit. 'phantom tooth') is an extinct genus of keeunamorphian marsupial in the family Keeunidae, known from the Early Miocene Riversleigh World Heritage Area of Australia. The genus contains two species: the type species, Phantasmodon travouilloni, known from several teeth and tooth-bearing bones, and Phantasmodon minuferox, known from two teeth.

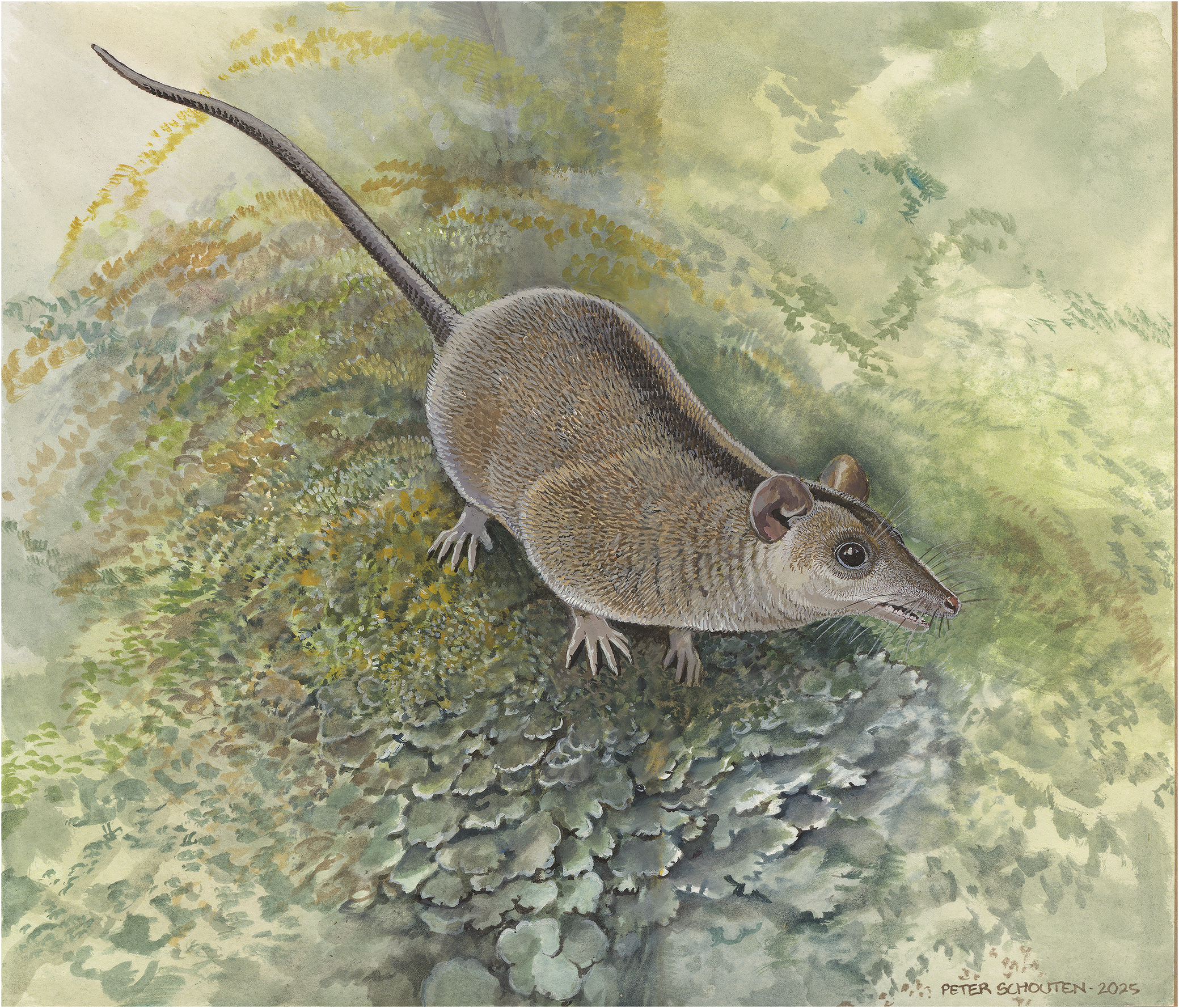
Life restoration of P. travouilloni

== See also ==
- Riversleigh fauna
