= Nambaroo =

Nambaroo Temporal range: Late Oligocene–Early Miocene

Scientific classification
- Kingdom: Animalia
- Phylum: Chordata
- Class: Mammalia
- Infraclass: Marsupialia
- Order: Diprotodontia
- Family: †Balbaridae
- Genus: †Nambaroo; Flannery and Rich, 1986

Type species
- Nambaroo tarrinyeri Flannery & Rich, 1986

Species
- N. novus Flannery & Rich, 1986; N. saltavus Flannery & Rich, 1986; N. tarrinyeri Flannery & Rich, 1986

Extinct genus of marsupials

Nambaroo is an extinct genus of macropod marsupial from the late Oligocene to the early Miocene of Australia.

Recent research suggests that the many species belonging to this genus may be either be invalid or belong to the closely related Ganawamaya.

== Sources ==
- "Granddaddy of Kangaroos" Found in Aussie Fossil at National Geographic
