= Mike Archer (paleontologist) =

Australian paleontologist

Michael Archer AM, FAA, Dist FRSN
- Born: 1945 (age 80–81); Sydney, New South Wales, Australia
- Spouse: Suzanne Hand
- Children: 2 daughters

Michael Archer (born 1945) is an Australian paleontologist specialising in Australian vertebrates. He is a professor at the School of Biological, Earth & Environmental Sciences, University of New South Wales. His previous appointments include Director of the Australian Museum 1999–2004 and Dean of Science at the University of New South Wales 2004–2009.

== Education and career ==
Archer was born in Sydney but raised in the United States and studied at Princeton University. From 1972 to 1978, he was the curator of mammals at the Queensland Museum. Since 1983, he has been involved with the exploration of the Riversleigh fossil site in Queensland.

Archer regularly engages in active debates with creationists.

During his time as director of the Australian Museum, Archer was the initiator of attempts to clone the Thylacine, an animal that went extinct in 1936. Archer has stated that he is obsessed with bringing the thylacine back to life via cloning. He has said that his obsession is going to push the research further and further until he and his team will have their first living thylacine clone.

In 2011, Archer published an article asserting that a vegetarian diet causes more suffering and deaths of animals than an omnivorous diet based on sustainable husbandry.

Archer is married to the paleontologist Suzanne Hand, with whom he has two daughters.

Below is a list of taxa that Archer has contributed to naming:

Year	Taxon	Authors
2026	Miyumba chrisdickmani gen. et sp. nov.	Churchill, Archer, Hand, & Farman
2026	Phantasmodon minuferox sp. nov.	Churchill, Archer, Hand, & Beck
2026	Phantasmodon travouilloni gen. et sp. nov.	Churchill, Archer, Hand, & Beck
2024	Ngamalacinus nigelmarveni sp. nov.	Churchill, Archer, & Hand
2024	Nimbacinus peterbridgei sp. nov.	Churchill, Archer, & Hand
2024	Badjcinus timfaulkneri sp. nov.	Churchill, Archer, & Hand
2023	Carettochelys niahensis sp. nov.	White, Archer, Hand, Godthelp, & Gillespie
2023	Xenorhinos bhatnagari sp. nov.	Hand, Archer, Gillespie, & Myers
2022	Manuherikia primadividua sp. nov.	Worthy, Scofield, Salisbury, Hand, De Pietri, Blokland, & Archer
2022	Notochen bannockburnensis gen. et sp. nov.	Worthy, Scofield, Hand, De Pietri, & Archer
2019	Heracles inexpectatus gen. et sp. nov.	Worthy, Hand, Archer, Scofield, & De Pietri
2019	Litorallus livezeyi gen. et sp. nov.	Mather, Tennyson, Scofield, De Pietri, Hand, Archer, Handley, & Worthy
2019	Priscaweka parvales gen. et sp. nov.	Mather, Tennyson, Scofield, De Pietri, Hand, Archer, Handley, & Worthy
2018	Vulcanops jennyworthyae gen. et sp. nov.	Hand, Beck, Archer, Simmons, Gunnell, Scofield, Tennyson, De Pietri, Salisbury, & Worthy
2016	Microleo attenboroughi gen. et sp. nov.	Gillespie, Archer, & Hand
2016	Dromornis murrayi sp. nov.	Worthy, Handley, Archer, & Hand
2015	Marnenycteris michauxi gen. et sp. nov.	Hand, Sigé, Archer, Gunnell, & Simmons
2015	Ganguroo robustifer sp. nov.	Cooke, Travouillon, Archer, & Hand
2013	Obdurodon tharalkooschild sp. nov.	Pian, Archer, & Hand
2013	Kurrartapu johnnguyeni gen. et sp. nov.	Nguyen, Worthy, Boles, Hand, & Archer
2012	Priscakoala lucyturnbullae gen. et sp. nov.	Black, Archer, & Hand
2011	Naraboryctes philcreaseri gen. et sp. nov.	Archer, Beck, Gott, Hand, Godthelp, & Black
2010	Kuiornis indicator gen. et sp. nov.	Worthy, Hand, Nguyen, Tennyson, Worthy, Scofield, Boles, & Archer
2007	Warendja encorensis sp. nov.	Brewer, Archer, Hand, & Godthelp
1999	Djarthia murgonensis gen. et sp. nov.	Godthelp, Wroe, & Archer
1995	Kollikodon ritchiei gen. et sp. nov.	Flannery, Archer, Rich, & Jones
1985	Steropodon galmani gen. et sp. nov.	Archer, Flennery, Ritchie, & Molnar
1979	Namilamadeta snideri gen. et sp. nov.	Rich & Archer
1978	Propleopus chillagoensis sp. nov.	Archer, Bartholomai, & Marshall

== Honours ==
- 1984: Clarke Medal, Royal Society of New South Wales
- 1987: Inaugural Queensland Museum Medal for Research
- 1989: Australian Heritage Award for Nature Conservation
- 1990: Inaugural Eureka Prize for the Promotion of Science
- 1990: Inaugural IBM Conservation Award for Research
- 1994: Mueller Medal, ANZAAS
- 1996: Verco Medal, Royal Society of South Australia
- 1998: Australian Skeptic of the Year
- 2002: Fellow, Australian Academy of Science (FAA)
- 2008: Member of the Order of Australia (AM)
- 2009: Fellow of the Royal Society of New South Wales (FRSN)
- 2019: Romer-Simpson Medal of the Society of Vertebrate Paleontology (USA)
- 2025: Robert Etheridge Jr Medal, The Australasian Palaeontologists (AAP) and the Geological Society of Australia

== Publications ==
- Archer, M. (Ed.) (1982). Carnivorous Marsupials. Royal Zoological Society of New South Wales, 1982. ISBN 978-0-9599951-3-8 (2 volumes)
- Archer, M. and Clayton, C. (Eds.) (1984). Vertebrate Zoogeography & Evolution in Australasia: Animals in Space & Time. Hesperian Press. ISBN 978-0-85905-036-4
- Archer, M. and Flannery, T.F. with Grigg, G.C. (1985) The Kangaroo. Kevin Weldon Press. ISBN 978-0-949708-22-9
- Archer, M., Hand, S. and Godthelp, H. (1986). Uncovering Australia's Dreamtime. Surrey Beatty & Sons ISBN 0-949324-07-8
- Archer, M. (Ed.) (1987). Possums and Opossums: Studies in Evolution. Surrey Beatty & Sons in association with the Royal Zoological Society of New South Wales. ISBN 0-949324-05-1
- Cronin, L. (Ed.) (1987). Koala: Australia's Endearing Marsupial. Reed Books Pty, Ltd. ISBN 978-0-7301-0158-1 (text by Archer et al.)
- Long, J.A., Archer, M., Flannery, T. and Hand, S. (2002). Prehistoric mammals of Australia and New Guinea: One hundred million years of evolution. University of NSW Press. ISBN 978-0-86840-435-6
- Archer, M., Hand, S. and Godthelp, H. (2000). Australia's lost world: Prehistoric animals of Riversleigh. Indiana University Press. ISBN 978-0-253-33914-0
- Archer, Michael; Beale, Bob (2004). Going Native: Living in the Australian Environment. Sydney: Hodder Headline. p. 358. ISBN 0-7336-1522-8.

Awards
Preceded by Keith Crook	Clarke Medal; 1984	Succeeded by H. B. S. Womersley
