= Ganguroo =

Ganguroo Temporal range: Early Miocene–Late Miocene

Scientific classification
- Kingdom: Animalia
- Phylum: Chordata
- Class: Mammalia
- Infraclass: Marsupialia
- Order: Diprotodontia
- Family: Potoroidae
- Subfamily: †Bulungamayinae
- Genus: †Ganguroo; Cooke, 1997

Type species
- †Ganguroo bilamina Cooke, 1997

Species
- G. bilamina; G. bites Travouillon et al., 2014; G. robustiter Cooke et al., 2015

Extinct genus of marsupials

Ganguroo is a genus of fossil macropods found at Riversleigh in Australia, material dating from the Early to Late Miocene subepochs. The type species of the genus is Ganguroo bilamina, described in 1997. Two recently described species, Ganguroo bites and Ganguroo robustiter, have also been placed in this genus.

== Palaeobiology ==
=== Palaeoecology ===
Three dimensional geometric morphometric analysis shows that Ganguroo was herbivorous rather than omnivorous or fungivorous.
