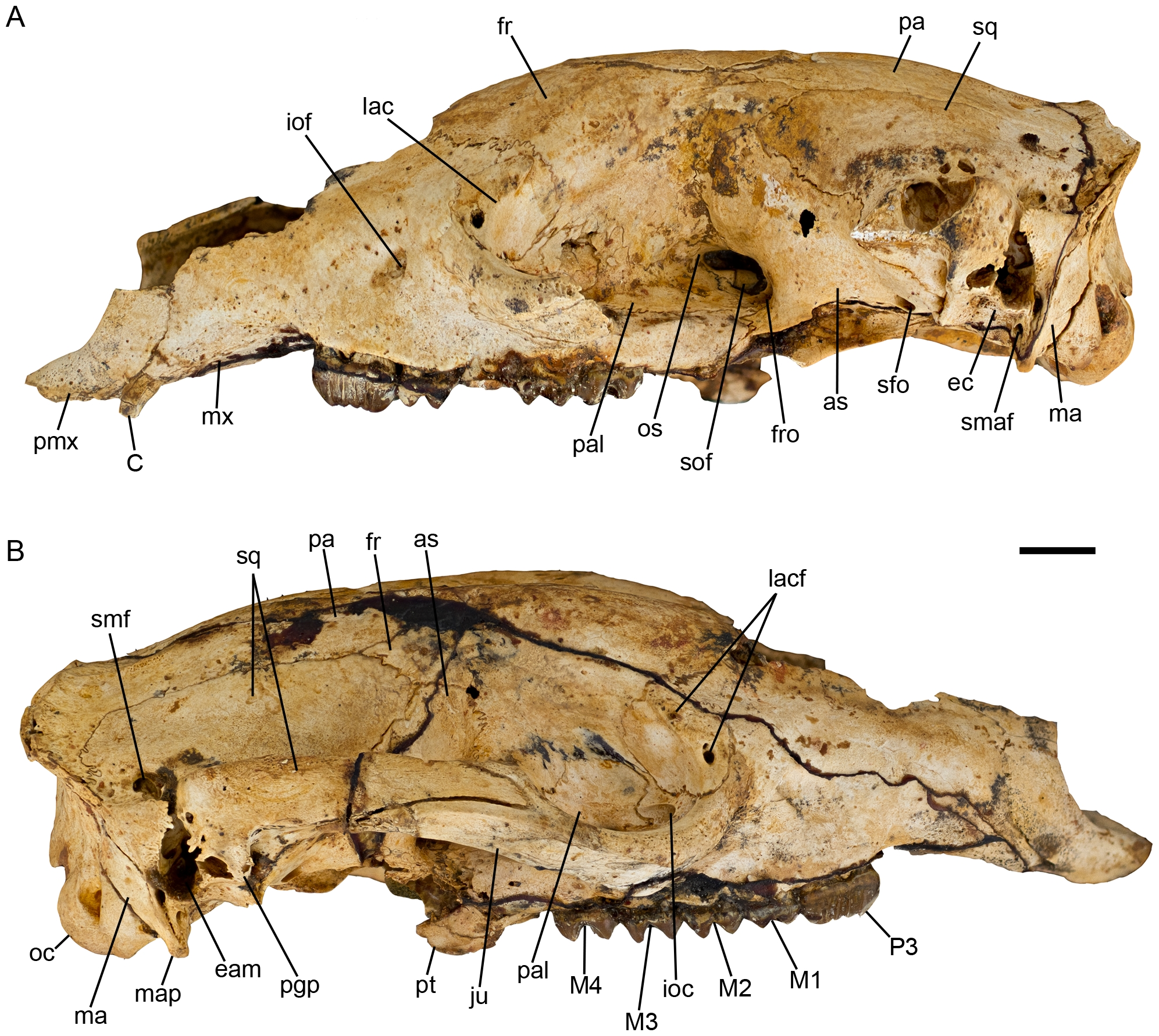
- Balbaroo nalima

Scientific classification
- Kingdom: Animalia
- Phylum: Chordata
- Class: Mammalia
- Infraclass: Marsupialia
- Order: Diprotodontia
- Superfamily: Macropodoidea
- Family: †Balbaridae; Kear and Cooke, 1999

Genera
- †Galanarla?; †Balbarinae Flannery, Archer & Plane, 1983; †Balbaroo; †Wururoo?; †Nambarinae? Cooke & Kear, 2001; †Ganawamaya; †Nambaroo

= Balbaridae =

Balbaridae Temporal range: Late Oligocene–Late Miocene

Extinct family of marsupials

The Balbaridae are an extinct family of basal macropods. The synapomorphies are divided into two areas, the dental and cranial. The dental area of this taxa can be described as having the molar lophodont and brachyodont with a hypolophid formed by lingually displaced component of posthypocristid and linked to a buccal crest from the entoconid. Molars have a hypocingulid, first lower molar compressed with the "forelink" absent. First incisor with lingual and dorsal enamel ridgelets. The third lower premolar of some taxa have a posterobuccal cusp (cusp at the back close to the cheek). The skull is defined by four shared characteristics, a large sinuses, postorbital lateral constriction of the skull, a hypertrophy of the mastoid processes and no auditory bulla formed by an inflated tympanic wing of the alisphenoid.
