= Wynyardiidae =

Wynyardiidae Temporal range: Oligocene–Miocene

Scientific classification
- Kingdom: Animalia
- Phylum: Chordata
- Class: Mammalia
- Infraclass: Marsupialia
- Order: Diprotodontia
- Infraorder: Vombatomorphia
- Family: †Wynyardiidae; Osgood, 1921

Genera
- †Ayekaye; †Muramura; †Namilamadeta; †Wynyardia

Extinct family of marsupials

Wynyardiidae is an extinct family of possum-like marsupials from the early Miocene of Wynyard in Tasmania, long been considered to display skeletal features that are intermediate between the primitive polyprotodont and the advanced diprotodont marsupials.

Wynyardia's brain is clearly phalangeroid in external morphology, resembling closely that of the extant phalangerid Trichosurus vulpecula. This indicates that by 21 million years ago, an unambiguously phalangerid brain had evolved within the Diprotodonta family, indicating that both groups had a common ancestor prior to this date. Research on Wynyardia bassiana's relationship with fossil phalangerid species of the Miocene is an ongoing process.

== Species ==
- †Wynyardiidae (Osgood 1921)
  - †Ayekaye jaredi (Megirian et al., 2004)
  - †Wynyardia bassiana (Spencer 1901)
  - †Muramura williamsi (Pledge in Archer 1987)
  - †Muramura pinpensis (Pledge N S 2003)
  - †Namilamadeta snideri (Rich & Archer 1979)
