= Barinya =

Barinya Temporal range: Early Miocene–Middle Miocene

Scientific classification
- Kingdom: Animalia
- Phylum: Chordata
- Class: Mammalia
- Infraclass: Marsupialia
- Order: Dasyuromorphia
- Family: †Malleodectidae
- Subfamily: †Barinyainae; Wroe, 1999
- Genus: †Barinya; Wroe, 1999

Type species
- Barinya wangala (Wroe, 1999)

Other species
- †Barinya kutjamarpensis (Binfield et al., 2017)

Extinct genus of marsupials

Barinya is a fossil genus from the marsupial family Malleodectidae. It is the only genus in the subfamily Barinyainae.

The principal differences between Barinya and more recent dasyurids are in the dentition and skull morphology, with Barinya displaying more primitive features. One described fossil exists and at least one remains to be described. This genus has only been found at Riversleigh in Queensland, Australia, where it is quite common in deposits from the Oligo-Miocene.
