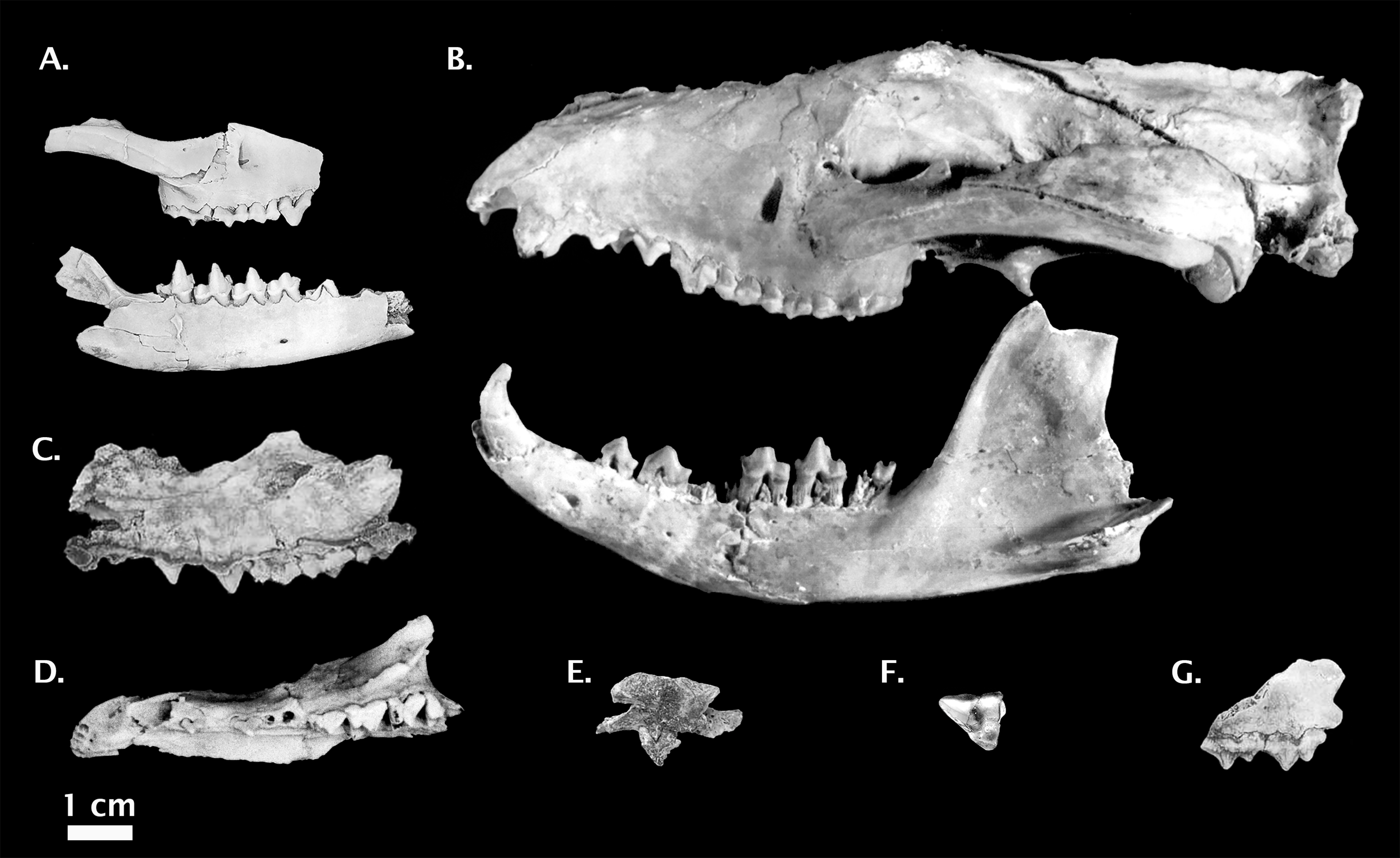
- Holotype specimen of M. muirheadae (F) compared to other fossil thylacinids

Scientific classification
- Kingdom: Animalia
- Phylum: Chordata
- Class: Mammalia
- Infraclass: Marsupialia
- Order: Dasyuromorphia
- Family: †Thylacinidae
- Genus: †Maximucinus
- Species: †M. muirheadae

Binomial name
- †Maximucinus muirheadae Wroe, 2001

= Maximucinus =

Maximucinus Temporal range: Middle Miocene, 14.2-12.9 Ma

Extinct species of marsupial

Maximucinus (lit. 'large dog') is an extinct genus of thylacinid marsupial that inhabited northeastern Australia during the Middle Miocene. The genus contains a single species, Maximucinus muirheadae, known only from a single isolated tooth found at the Riversleigh World Heritage Area. It was the largest thylacinid of its time, reaching a body size of 18 kg (40 lbs).

== Discovery and naming ==
The remains of Maximucinus were discovered at the Riversleigh World Heritage Area, in the Boodjamulla National Park, north-western Queensland. The holotype and only known specimen, catalogued as QM F30331, is an isolated right upper molar collected from the Middle Miocene-aged Ringtail Site.

In 2001, Stephen Wroe described Maximucinus muirheadae as a new genus and species of thylacinid based on these fossil remains. The generic epithet, Maximucinus, is a combination of the Latin word "maximus", meaning large, and the Greek word "kynos", meaning dog. The specific name was chosen to honour fellow researcher Jeanette Muirhead, in recognition for her contributions towards the study of fossil thylacinids.

== Description ==
The single known tooth, a right upper molar, is large, with a maximum length of 11.2 mm (0.4 in) and maximum width of 9.1 mm (0.36 in). It has a triangular outline in occlusal view (looking onto the tooth). The metacone is the largest cusp, while the protocone is the smallest. Stylar cusp B and D are well-developed and compressed laterally (from side-to-side), whereas stylar cusp C and E are absent. The largest shearing crest is the postmetacrista, followed by the premetacrista, preparacrista and postparacrista. The anterior cingulum is continuous with the preparacrista, a crest that extends from the metacone and towards the front of the tooth, but a weakly developed notch separates the cingulum from the parastyle. A very small protoconule and metaconule are present in the vicinity of the protocone and metacone, respectively.

Maximucinus is a large thylacinid, comparable in size to small Tasmanian tigers, with an estimated body weight of 18 kg (40 lbs).

== Classification ==
In 2001, Maximucinus was recognised as a member of Thylacinidae. In their 2014 description of additional Thylacinus potens material, Adam Yates compiled a new phylogenetic matrix derived from several past analyses. Maximucinus was placed in an unresolved polytomy with Wabulacinus ridei, Thylacinus macknessi and a clade containing all other Thylacinus species. These results are displayed in the cladogram below:

- - Dasyuridae
  - Thylacinidae
    - Muribacinus gadiyuli
    - - - Badjcinus turnbulli
        - Ngamalacinus timmulvaneyi
      - - - Mutpuracinus archibaldi
          - - Nimbacinus dicksoni
            - Nimbacinus richi
        - - Tyarrpecinus rothi
          - - Maximucinus muirheadae
            - Wabulacinus ridei
            - Thylacinus macknessi
            - - Thylacinus potens
              - - Thylacinus megiriani
                - Thylacinus cynocephalus

== Paleobiology ==
Maximucinus is known from Ringtail Site at the Riversleigh World Heritage Area, which was radiometrically dated to ~14.2-12.9 million years ago and therefore corresponds to the Middle Miocene. The locality may have formed under low-energy fluvial conditions, such as a tufa barrage pond, and accumulated over a period of time. Various factors like the high number of arboreal taxa, overall species richness and the presence of certain rainforest taxa suggests that a lowland rainforest environment was present at the site.

Animals that lived alongside Maximucinus include the monotreme Obdurodon dicksoni; the diprotodontid Nimbadon lavarackorum; the pygmy possum Burramys brutyi; the ringtail possum Marlu kutjamarpensis; the rail Australlus disneyi; the mekosuchine crocodiles Trilophosuchus rackhami and Mekosuchus sanderi; the turtles Wabanbara ringtailensis, Pseudemydura sp. and ?Emydura sp.; and the agamid lizard Sulcatidens quadratus.

=== Diet and feeding ===
The upper molar of Maximucinus shows some specialisations towards hypercarnivory (i.e. reduced protoconule and metaconule cusps), but was notably less specialised than that of more derived thylacinids as it still retains well-developed stylar cusps.
