= Riversleigh fauna =

List of animal fossils found in Riversleigh World Heritage Area, Queensland

Riversleigh fauna is the collective term for any species of animal identified in fossil sites located in the Riversleigh World Heritage Area.

== Faunal zones ==
The Riversleigh fauna from the Oligo-Miocene has been exceptionally well-preserved. Such fossils have been classified into four "faunal zones",:

- Faunal Zone A (FZA): late Oligocene, a period 23.03–28.4 million years before present
- Faunal Zone B (FZB): early Miocene, 15.97-23.03 myr
- Faunal Zone C (FZC): middle Miocene, 11.608-15.97 myr
- Faunal Zone D (FZD): late Miocene, 5.332-11.608 myr

More recent fossil specimens are coded by their period of deposition,

- Pliocene (PLIO), 2.588-5.332 myr
- Pleistocene (PLEIS), 0.0117-2.588 myr
- Holocene (HOLO), present day to 11,700 years ago

== Faunal lists ==
The following are incomplete lists of mammals, birds, fish, and invertebrate species and genera included in the Riversleigh fauna, according to the compilation of taxa by researchers at the University of New South Wales and Queensland (wakaleo.net). A 2006 survey of the Riversleigh fauna identified over 290 named species.

The fauna of Riversleigh includes placental mammals, especially bats, and the various families of marsupials. Due to the novelty of some taxa discovered in the area, some species have been placed in tentative arrangements or unknown lineages, sometimes within undescribed higher taxa.

The mammals discovered at the site include fossils from the Yingabalanaridae (weirdodonta) family, whose classification is currently uncertain.

=== Chiroptera (bats) ===
- Archerops annectens, an Old World leaf-nosed bat
- Archerops watsoni, an Old World leaf-nosed bat
- Brachipposideros nooraleebus, an Old World leaf-nosed bat
- Brevipalatus mcculloughi Hand 2005, a hipposiderid bat, resembling the modern orange leaf-nosed Rhinonicteris aurantia
- Hipposideros bernardsigei, an Old World leaf-nosed bat
- Hipposideros winsburyorum, an Old World leaf-nosed bat
- Hydromops riversleighensis, an Old World leaf-nosed bat
- Icarops aenae, a New Zealand short-tailed bat
- Icarops paradox, a New Zealand short-tailed bat
- Leuconoe sp., a poorly known bat
- Macroderma gigas, a carnivorous bat, still living and known as the ghost bat
- Macroderma godthelpi, a relative of the ghost bat, that existed in the early Miocene
- Macroderma malugara, a relative of the ghost bat, that existed in the middle Miocene
- Miophyllorhina riversleighensis, an Old World leaf-nosed bat
- Petramops creaseri, a free tailed bat
- Riversleigha williamsi, an Old World leaf-nosed bat
- Rhinonicteris tedfordi, a microbat
- Taphozous sp., a sheath-tailed bat
- Taphozous georgianus, a sheath-tailed bat
- Xenorhinos halli, an Old World leaf-nosed bat

=== Macropodiformes (kangaroos, bettongs, potoroos and rat-kangaroos) ===
- Balbaroo, a balbarid
- Bettongia moyesi, a bettong
- Bulungamaya, a member of Bulungamayinae
- Cookeroo, a kangaroo
- Ekaltadeta, an extinct carnivorous member of Hypsiprymnodontidae
- Galanarla, a balbarid
- Ganawamaya, a balbarid
- Ganguroo, a member of Bulungamayinae
- Gumardee, a member of Potoroidae
- Hypsiprymnodon bartholomaii, a frugivorous hypsiprymnodontid
- Hypsiprymnodon dennisi, a frugivorous hypsiprymnodontid
- Hypsiprymnodon karenblackae, a frugivorous hypsiprymnodontid
- Hypsiprymnodon philcreaseri, a frugivorous hypsiprymnodontid
- Rhizosthenurus, a sthenurine kangaroo
- Wabularoo, a balbarid
- Wakiewakie, a potoroid
- Wanburoo, a member of Bulungamayinae
- Wururoo, a balbarid

=== Phalangeriformes (possums) ===
- Acrobates magicus, a feathertail possum
- Acrobates pettitorum, a feathertail possum
- Archerus johntoniae, a phalangerid possum
- Distoechurus georginae, a feathertail possum
- Distoechurus jeanesorum, a feathertail possum
- Burramys, an extinct relative of the mountain pygmy possum
- Cercartetus, a possum
- Chunia, a possum
- Djaludjangi, a gliding possum
- Djilgaringa, a possum
- Durudawiri, a possum
- Gawinga, a ringtail possum
- Marlu, a ringtail possum
- Onirocuscus, a brushtail possum
- Paljara, a ringtail possum
- Pildra, a ringtail possum
- Strigocuscus, a possum
- Trichosurus, a brushtail possum
- Wyulda, a brushtail possum

=== Vombatiformes (koalas, marsupial lions, wombats, etc) ===
- Enigmaleo, a marsupial lion
- Kuterintja, an extinct marsupial of the family Ilariidae
- Lekaneleo, a marsupial lion
- Litokoala, a koala
- Marada arcanum, a sheep-like browser
- Microleo, a small marsupial lion
- Namilamadeta, an extinct marsupial of the family Wynyardiidae
- Neohelos, a diprotodontid sheep-like browser
- Nimbavombatus, a wombat
- Ngapakaldia, a marsupial tapir
- Nimbadon, a sheep-like browser
- Nimiokoala, a koala
- Palorchestes, a diprotodontid marsupial tapir
- Propalorchestes, a diprotodontid marsupial tapir
- Priscakoala, a koala
- Rhizophascolonus, a wombat
- Silvabestius, a diprotodontid sheep-like browser
- Stelakoala riversleighensis, a koala
- Wakaleo, a marsupial lion
- Warendja, a wombat

=== Peramelemorphia (bandicoots and bilbies) ===
- Bulungu, a mouse-sized insectivorous bandicoot
- Crash, a bandicoot
- Galadi, a bandicoot
- Liyamayi dayi, a bilby relative
- Madju, a bandicoot
- Yarala, a tube-nosed bandicoot

=== Dasyuromorphia ===
- Badjcinus, a thylacine
- Barinya, a basal malleodectid
- Chitinodectes, a malleodectid with snail eating dentition
- Exosmachus, a malleodectid with snail eating dentition
- Ganbulanyi, a dasyuromorphian
- Joculusium, a dasyuromorphian
- Malleodectes, a malleodectid with snail eating dentition
- Maximucinus, a thylacine
- Mayigriphus, a dasyurid
- Miyumba, a dasyurid
- Mutpuracinus, a dasyuromorphian
- Muribacinus, a dasyuromorphian
- Nimbacinus, a thylacine
- Ngamalacinus, a thylacine
- Protamalleus, a basal malleodectid
- Wabulacinus, a thylacine
- Weirdodectes, a malleodectid with snail eating dentition

=== Other mammals ===
- Naraboryctes, a marsupial mole
- Obdurodon, a giant toothed platypus
- Phantasmodon, a keeunamorphian marsupial
- Yalkaparidon, a marsupial
- Yingabalanara, a weirdodontan mammal

=== Birds ===
- Australlus, a flightless rail
- Barawertornis, a mihirung
- Cacatua, a cockatoo
- Ciconia, a stork
- Collocalia, a swiftlet
- Corvitalusoides, a passerine
- Dasyornis walterbolesi, a bristlebird
- Daphoenositta trevorworthy, a sittella
- Dromornis, a mihirung
- Emuarius, a relative of the cassowary and emu
- Eoanseranas, a magpie-goose
- Kurrartapu, a cracticid
- Longmornis, an Old World oriole
- Melopsittacus, a budgerigar
- Menura, a lyrebird
- Orthonyx, a logrunner
- Pengana, a flexible-footed bird of prey
- Pinpanetta, a stiff-tailed duck
- Primophaps, a bronzewing pigeon
- Sericuloides marynguyenae, a bowerbird

=== Reptiles ===
- Baru, the cleaver-headed crocodile
- Egernia, a skink
- Elseya lavarackorum, a side neck turtle that is still living today
- Incongruelaps, a venomous snake
- Mekosuchus, a mekosuchine
- Meiolania, a horned turtle
- Morelia riversleighensis, a large python
- Nanowana, extinct snakes (Madtsoiidae)
- Physignathus, a dragon lizard
- Pseudemydura, a side neck turtle
- Pygopus, a legless lizard
- Quinkana meboldi, a mekosuchine
- Ramphotyphlops, a blind snake
- Sulcatidens, a dragon lizard
- Tiliqua, a skink
- Trilophosuchus, a tree-dwelling mekosuchine
- Ultrastenos, a mekosuchine
- Varanus, a monitor lizard
- Warkalania, a horned turtle
- Wonambi, extinct snakes (Madtsoiidae)
- Yurlunggur, extinct snakes (Madtsoiidae)

=== Amphibians ===
- Crinia, a frog
- Philoria, a frog
- Lechriodus, a frog
- Limnodynastes, a frog
- Litoria, a tree-dwelling frog

=== Dipnoi (lungfishes) ===
- Mioceratodus, a lungfish
- Neoceratodus, a lungfish
