= Suzanne Hand =

Australian palaeontologist

Professor Suzanne Hand AO FRSN FRZS
- Born: 1955 (age 70–71)
- Occupations: Palaeontologist, biologist, geologist
- Spouse: Michael Archer
- Children: 2 daughters

Suzanne Joan Hand (born 1955) is Professor Emeritus at the University of New South Wales, a teacher of geology and biology, who has a special interest in vertebrate palaeontology and modern mammals. Her research has been published in over 250 articles and books, and is especially focused on the subjects of evolutionary biology, functional morphology, phylogenetics, and biogeography. Hand is a co-leader of the research team investigating the Riversleigh World Heritage Area, regarded as one of the four most important sites of fossil-bearing formations in the world.

Hand has described and named more than 140 new fossil taxa, including a new order, families, tribes, genera, and species of monotremes, marsupials, bats, birds, reptiles, and frogs. Amongst the recognition of Hand's contributions is the specific epithet of a fossil species of bird, Eoanseranas handae, discovered in the Riversleigh fossil sites.

Hand was appointed an Officer of the Order of Australia in the 2024 King's Birthday Honours for "distinguished service to palaeontology and zoology, particularly as a fossil bat and marsupial researcher, and to tertiary education". She was elected a Fellow of the Royal Zoological Society of New South Wales in 2001 and a Fellow of the Royal Society of New South Wales in 2015.

Below is a list of taxa that Hand has contributed to naming:

Year	Taxon	Authors
2026	Miyumba chrisdickmani gen. et sp. nov.	Churchill, Archer, Hand, & Farman
2026	Phantasmodon minuferox sp. nov.	Churchill, Archer, Hand, & Beck
2026	Phantasmodon travouilloni gen. et sp. nov.	Churchill, Archer, Hand, & Beck
2024	Ngamalacinus nigelmarveni sp. nov.	Churchill, Archer, & Hand
2024	Nimbacinus peterbridgei sp. nov.	Churchill, Archer, & Hand
2024	Badjcinus timfaulkneri sp. nov.	Churchill, Archer, & Hand
2023	Carettochelys niahensis sp. nov.	White, Archer, Hand, Godthelp, & Gillespie
2023	Murgonornis archeri gen. et sp. nov.	Worthy, De Pietri, Scofield, & Hand
2023	Xenorhinos bhatnagari sp. nov.	Hand, Archer, Gillespie, & Myers
2022	Manuherikia primadividua sp. nov.	Worthy, Scofield, Salisbury, Hand, De Pietri, Blokland, & Archer
2022	Notochen bannockburnensis gen. et sp. nov.	Worthy, Scofield, Hand, De Pietri, & Archer
2019	Heracles inexpectatus gen. et sp. nov.	Worthy, Hand, Archer, Scofield, & De Pietri
2019	Litorallus livezeyi gen. et sp. nov.	Mather, Tennyson, Scofield, De Pietri, Hand, Archer, Handley, & Worthy
2019	Priscaweka parvales gen. et sp. nov.	Mather, Tennyson, Scofield, De Pietri, Hand, Archer, Handley, & Worthy
2018	Vulcanops jennyworthyae gen. et sp. nov.	Hand, Beck, Archer, Simmons, Gunnell, Scofield, Tennyson, De Pietri, Salisbury, & Worthy
2018	Xylonycteris stenodon gen. et sp. nov.	Hand & Sigé
2016	Microleo attenboroughi gen. et sp. nov.	Gillespie, Archer, & Hand
2016	Dromornis murrayi sp. nov.	Worthy, Handley, Archer, & Hand
2015	Marnenycteris michauxi gen. et sp. nov.	Hand, Sigé, Archer, Gunnell, & Simmons
2015	Ganguroo robustifer sp. nov.	Cooke, Travouillon, Archer, & Hand
2013	Obdurodon tharalkooschild sp. nov.	Pian, Archer, & Hand
2013	Kurrartapu johnnguyeni gen. et sp. nov.	Nguyen, Worthy, Boles, Hand, & Archer
2012	Priscakoala lucyturnbullae gen. et sp. nov.	Black, Archer, & Hand
2011	Naraboryctes philcreaseri gen. et sp. nov.	Archer, Beck, Gott, Hand, Godthelp, & Black
2010	Kuiornis indicator gen. et sp. nov.	Worthy, Hand, Nguyen, Tennyson, Worthy, Scofield, Boles, & Archer
2008	Manuherikia douglasi sp. nov.	Worthy, Tennyson, Hand, & Scofield
2007	Warendja encorensis sp. nov.	Brewer, Archer, Hand, & Godthelp
1998	Xenorhinos halli gen. et sp. nov.	Hand
1998	Riversleigha williamsi gen. et sp. nov.	Hand
