= Tyarrpecinus =

Tyarrpecinus Temporal range: Late Miocene 8.5–5.5 Ma

Scientific classification
- Kingdom: Animalia
- Phylum: Chordata
- Class: Mammalia
- Infraclass: Marsupialia
- Order: Dasyuromorphia
- Family: †Thylacinidae
- Genus: †Tyarrpecinus
- Species: †T. rothi

Binomial name
- †Tyarrpecinus rothi Murray & Megirian, 2000

Extinct genus of marsupials

Tyarrpecinus is an extinct genus of thylacinid that lived during the late Miocene in what is now the Northern Territory, Australia. It is known only from a partial skull bone that was reconstructed from numerous fragments. It was a small thylacinid and represents a late surviving relict. The genus is monotypic, containing only one species, Tyarrpecinus rothi.

== History and naming ==
Tyarrpecinus was named and described in 2000 based on fossil material recovered from the late Miocene Alcoota Local Fauna of the Waite Formation, Northern Territory. The holotype and only known specimen, NTM P98211, is a left maxillary fragment reassembled from a concentration of small bone and tooth fragments. It is thought that it represents the contents of a crocodile coprolite as the fragments exhibit signs of chemical erosion and have a layer of calcite on them. Fossils of Tyarrpecinus, as well as those of many other animals from Alcoota, were found in a dense bone bed that accumulated after a mass mortality event. The exact cause has been a subject of debate, with earlier studies suggesting that waterhole-tethering was the cause. However, more recently, it is thought that a flood was instead responsible.

The genus named combines the Eastern Arrente word tyarrpa (cracked), pronounced as char-puh, and the Ancient Greek word kynos (dog). The name is in reference to the state of preservation of the holotype. The species name was chosen to honour Karl Roth, for his contributions towards the natural history of central Australia.

== Description ==
Although known from fragmentary remains, Tyrrapecinus displays a suit of characteristics that differentiates it from all other thylacinids. The first molar is narrow and elongated. The crest between the paracone and metacone cusps, known as a centrocrista, on the first molar is straight. An indentation on the buccal (cheek) side of the third molar is firmly established in it. The metastylar wing on the third molar is longer than it is wide. The paracone cusps are situated more closely to the metacone cusps and are smaller in size. Present on all molars are stylar cusps B and D, although the third molar has a relatively smaller stylar cusp B. Small cusps referred to as conules are reduced in size and number on each tooth.

Tyrrapecinus was a medium sized thylacinid, with Wroe (2001) and Rovinsky et al. (2019) both estimating its weight to be 5.4 kg (11.9 lbs).

== Classification ==
In its initial description, Tyarrpecinus was recovered as the plesiomorphic sister taxon to the genus Thylacinus. Similar results were attained by Yates (2014) and Rovinsky et al. (2019) but differed slightly in that it was sister to both Wabulacinus and Thylacinus. However, in at least one phylogenetic analysis performed by Rovinsky et al. (2019), it claded with Wabulacinus and Thylacinus potens as a sister group to all other species of Thylacinus, making the latter genus non-monophyletic. Regardless of its proper placement within Thylacinidae, Tyarrpecinus represents a late surviving relict as all other thylacinids ensuing the late Miocene belonged to the genus Thylacinus. Furthermore, it also demonstrates that at least two species of thylacinids were present during the late Miocene.

- Thylacinidae
  - Badjcinus turnbulli
  - - - Nimbacinus dicksoni
      - - Muribacinus gadiyuli
        - Ngamalacinus timmulvaneyi
    - - Tyarrpecinus rothi
      - - Wabulacinus ridei
        - Thylacinus
          - Thylacinus macknessi
          - - Thylacinus potens
            - - Thylacinus megiriani
              - Thylacinus yorkellus
              - Thylacinus cynocephalus

In one phylogenetic analysis performed by Churchill et al. (2024), Tyarrpecinus was found to be a non-thylacinid dasyuromorphian, and in a well-supported clade containing Barinya and Myrmecobius.

== Paleobiology ==
Tyarrpecinus is known solely from the lower horizon of the Waite Formation, known as the Alcoota Local Fauna. Based on bicorrelation, it is thought that the Alcoota Local Fauna spans from ~8.5 to 5.5 Ma. The region, at the time of the late Miocene, would have been a lacustrine basin. During times of abundant rainfall, the basin would have held a shallow lake stretching several kilometres. Fish are notably absent from Alcoota, which suggests that surface water was ephemeral. Turtles, such as Chelodina murrayi, are notably rare and are thought to have been related to drought-resistant extant taxa. Murray & Megirian (1992) considered the terrestrial biome to be subtropical savannah and localized forests with little to no vegetation in the catchment area of the basin. In contrast, Mao & Retallack (2019) inferred the biome to have been open woodland and gallery forest based on paleosol samples.

Contemporaneous with Tyarrpecinus was the large-bodied, possibly durophagous thylacinid Thylacinus potens and the leopard-sized thylacoleonid Wakaleo alcootaensis. Abundant at the Alcoota site are the remains of the diprotodontids Kolopsis, Plaisiodon and Pyramios, and the macropodids Dorcopsoides and Hadronomas. Waterbirds are known and are represented anatids, flamingos, storks, darters and shorebirds.
