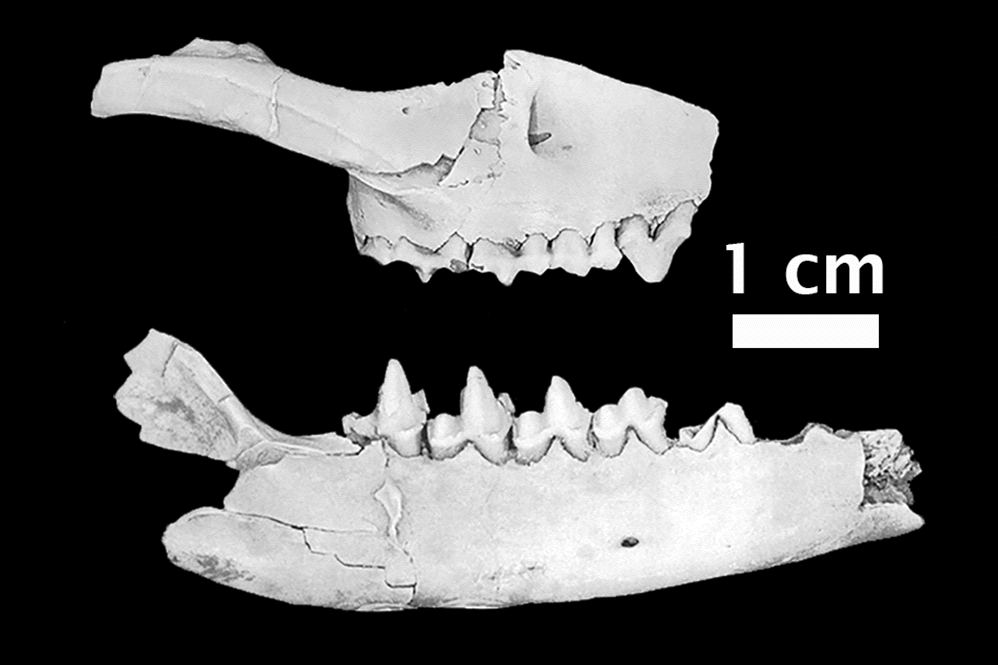
- Holotype and paratype specimens of Muribacinus.

Scientific classification
- Kingdom: Animalia
- Phylum: Chordata
- Class: Mammalia
- Infraclass: Marsupialia
- Order: Dasyuromorphia
- Family: †Thylacinidae
- Genus: †Muribacinus
- Species: †M. gadiyuli

Binomial name
- †Muribacinus gadiyuli Wroe, 1995

= Muribacinus =

Muribacinus Temporal range: Middle Miocene, 15.1-12.9 Ma

Extinct species of marsupial

Muribacinus (lit. 'father dog') is an extinct genus of thylacinid marsupial that lived during the Middle Miocene in what is now northeastern Australia. The genus contains a single species, Muribacinus gadiyuli, known from a partial skull and lower jaw bone found at the Riversleigh World Heritage Area. Muribacinus is a small thylacinid, with an estimated body weight of 1.6–1.7 kilograms (3.5-3.7 lbs).

== History and naming ==
Location of the Riversleigh World Heritage Area in Queensland

The Muribacinus fossil material was discovered at the Riversleigh World Heritage Area (WHA), in the Boodjamulla National Park, north-western Queensland. The holotype specimen, catalogued as QM F30386, is a partial right maxilla and jugal containing the third upper premolar and full upper molar row. It was collected from Gag Site, which dates to the Middle Miocene. An additional specimen (QM F30385), consisting of a right dentary preserving the third lower premolar and full lower molar row, from the similarly aged Henk's Hollow Site was assigned as the paratype.

In 1995, Stephen Wroe described Muribacinus gadiyuli as a new genus and species of thylacinid based on these fossil remains. The generic epithet, Muribacinus, is a combination of the Waanyi word "muriba", meaning father, and the Ancient Greek word "kynos", meaning dog; the name was chosen to allude to its structurally ancestral position within Thylacinidae. The specific epithet is derived from the Waanyi word "gadiyuli", meaning little.

== Description ==
The infraorbital foramen of Muribacinus is bounded solely by the maxilla, and is positioned slightly in front of where the jugal meets the maxilla. The third upper premolar has a triangular occlusal outline and is large, being almost as long as the first upper molar. Small yet distinct cuspules are present on the posterior and posterolingual sides of this tooth. Its upper molars differ from those of other thylacinids in that the paracones and metacones are more separated, the protocones are larger and the stylar shelf is unreduced. The longest shearing crest on the first upper molar is the postmetacrista, which is about twice the length of the preparacrista. The second upper molar is much larger than the preceding tooth, and has a slightly longer preparacrista. In addition, it also possesses a small stylar cusp E, which is notably absent in all other upper molars. A shallow U-shaped ectoflexus extends along much of the longitudinal axis of the third upper molar. Its postmetacrista and preparacrista are subequal in length. In contrast, the preparacrista is the longest crest on the fourth upper molar.

The dentary is deepest below the first lower molar, reaching a depth of 11 mm (0.43 in). The mental foramen, an opening in the front of the jaw bone, is located under the protoconid of the first molar. A small gap called a diastema occurs between each of the lower premolars. The third lower premolar is slightly smaller than the second premolar. On all of the lower molars, the paraconid is larger than the metaconid. They also display a combination of derived traits associated with carnassialisation (an evolutionary process in which teeth become adapted for shearing flesh) on the trigonids without the talonids being reduced at the same time. The largest and most robust cusp on the first lower molar is the protoconid. This cusp becomes increasingly larger on each molar after it, until the fourth lower molar where it becomes smaller.

Muribaicnus is a small thylacinid, comparable in size to the tiger quoll, at about 1.6–1.7 kilograms (3.5-3.7 lbs).

== Classification ==
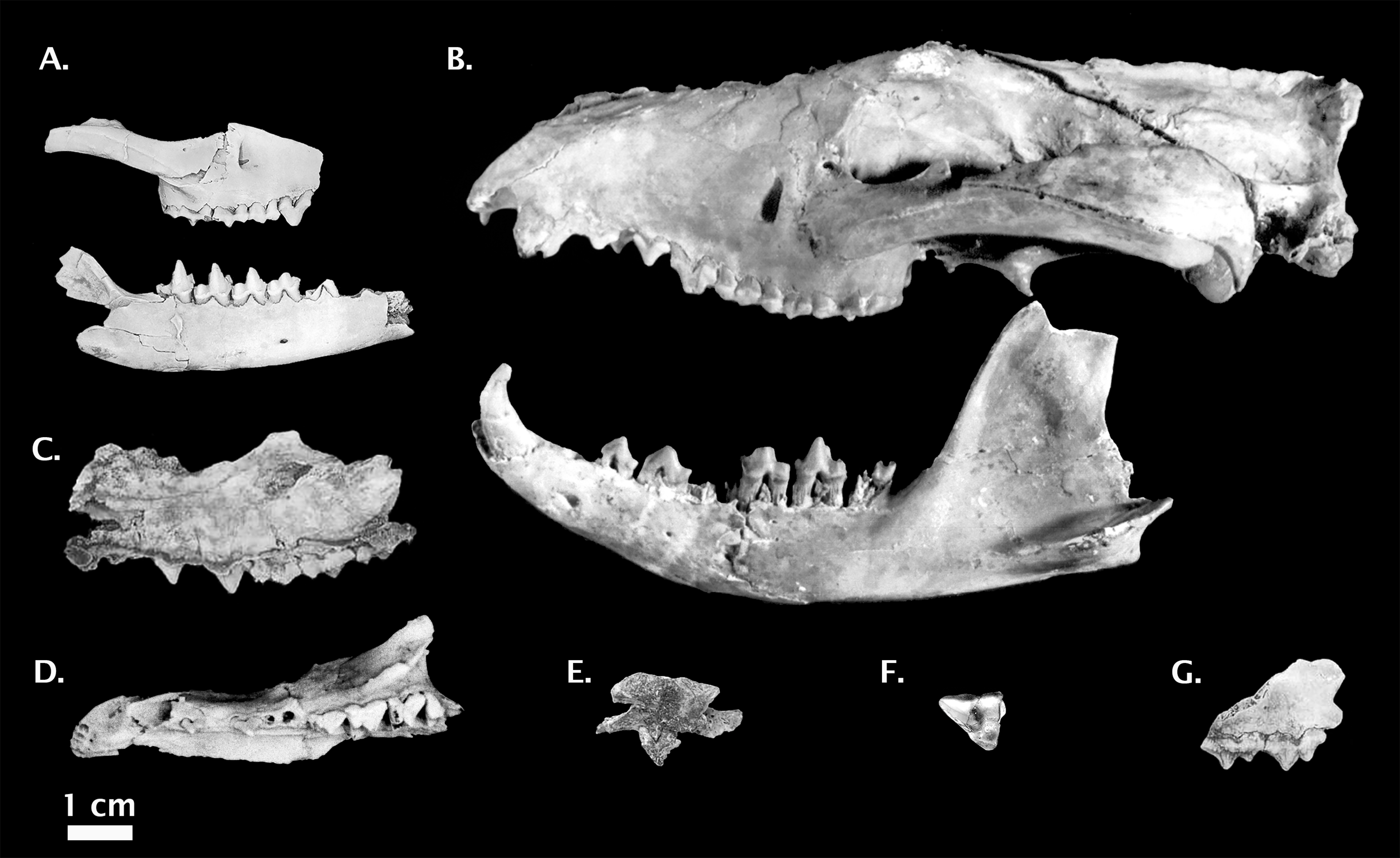
Muribacinus (A) compared to other non-Thylacinus fossil thylacinids.

Muribacinus was regarded as the most plesiomorphic member of the family Thylacinidae by Stephen Wroe in the phylogenetic analysis accompanying their 1995 description. Similar results have also been recovered in several analyses in the subsequent years, including by Murray & Megirian (2000), Yates (2014), and Churchill, Archer & Hand (2024).

In a 2016 study, Michael Archer and colleagues described additional material of the dasyuromorph Malleodectes from the Riversleigh WHA. Using a modified version of a dataset from several authors, a maximum parsimony analysis was performed by the researchers. In the analysis, Muribacinus formed a trichotomy with Nimbacinus and Ngamalacinus that was sister group to the genus Thylacinus.

In their 2019 overview of pre-Pleistocene thylacinids, Douglass Rovinsky and colleagues found Ngamalacinus to be the sister species of Muribacinus, and grouped them with Nimbacinus in their undated parsimony, and molecular and morphology tip-dated Bayesian analyses. However, in the Bayesian analysis that incorporated only morphological data, it formed an unresolved polytomy with Badjcinus, Ngamalacinus and Nimbacinus at the base of Thylacinidae.

The results of two analyses, displaying two of the possible hypotheses of the affinities of Muribacinus, are shown below.

Topology A: Rovinsky and colleagues (2019).

- - Thylacinidae
    - Badjcinus turnbulli
    - - - Nimbacinus dicksoni
        - - Muribacinus gadiyuli
          - Ngamalacinus timmulvaneyi
      - - Tyarrpecinus rothi
        - - Wabulacinus ridei
          - Thylacinus
            - Thylacinus macknessi
            - - Thylacinus potens
              - - Thylacinus megiriani
                - Thylacinus yorkellus
                - Thylacinus cynocephalus

Topology B: Churchill and colleagues (2024).

- - Thylacinidae
    - Muribacinus gadiyuli
    - - - - Ngamalacinus timmulvaneyi
          - Ngamalacinus nigelmarveni
        - - Badjcinus turnbulli
          - Nimbacinus dicksoni
          - Tyarrpecinus rothi
          - Badjcinus timfaulkneri
          - Nimbacinus peterbridgei
          - - - - Thylacinus macknessi
                - Wabulacinus ridei
              - Thylacinus
                - Thylacinus potens
                - - Thylacinus cynocephalus
                  - Thylacinus megiriani
                  - Thylacinus yorkellus

In their tip-and-node dated Bayesian analysis, Churchill, Archer & Hand (2024) found Muribacinus to lie outside of Thylacinidae and within a clade containing all other dasyuromorphians, specifically in a polytomy with Barinya, Tyarrpecinus, Myrmecobius and Dasyuridae.

== Paleobiology ==
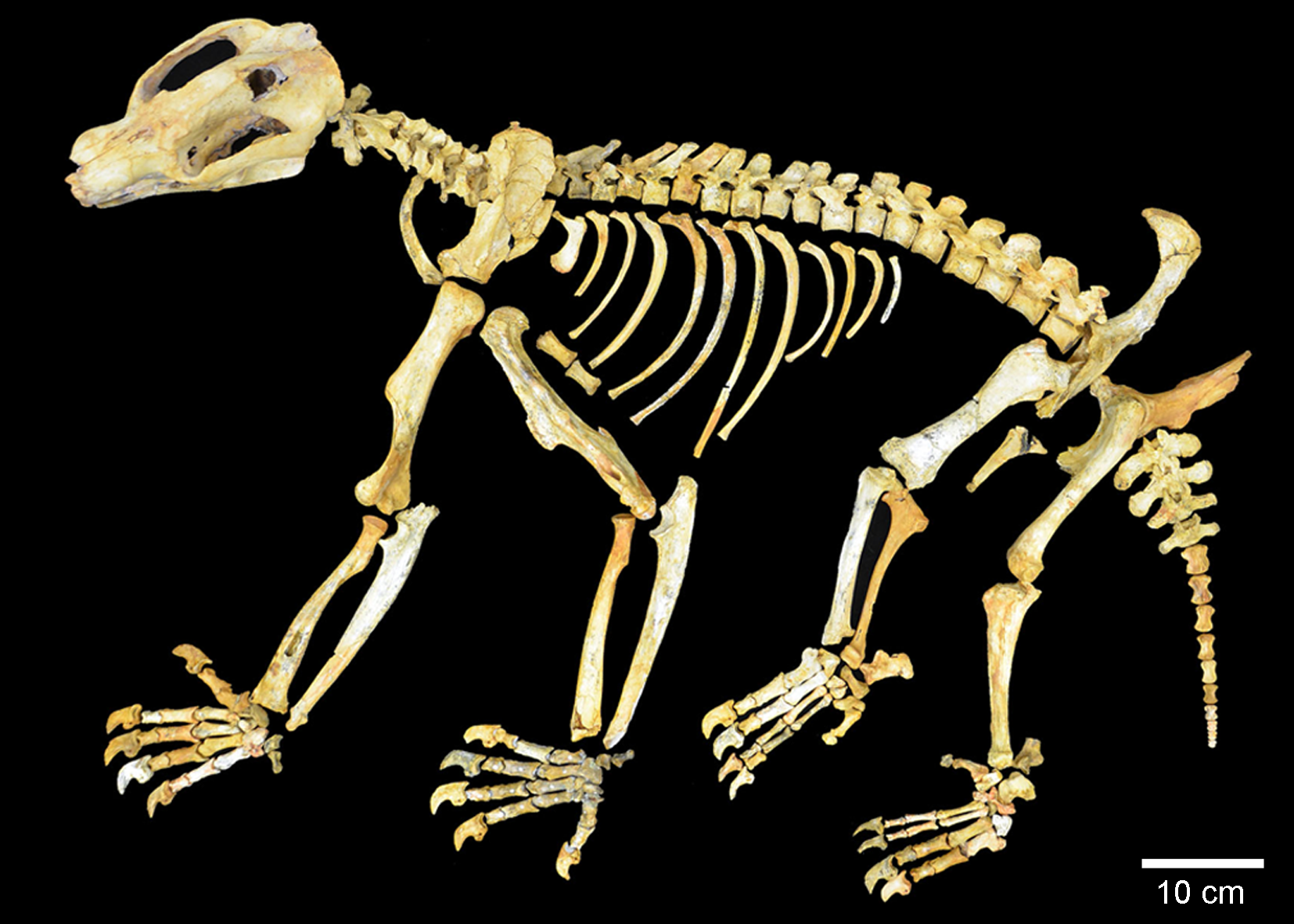
Muribacinus coexisted alongside early diprotodontids like Nimbadon lavarackorum.

=== Paleoenvironment ===
Fossils of Muribacinus are known from Gag Site and Henk's Hollow Site at the Riversleigh World Heritage Area. Although not directly dated, both sites are estimated to be around ~15.1–12.9 million years old (Ma), placing it within the Middle Miocene sub-epoch. Henk's Hollow Site has been interpreted as being formed within a cave environment. Various factors like the high number of arboreal taxa, overall species richness and the presence of certain rainforest taxa suggests that a lowland rainforest environment was next to and potentially overhanging the cave entrance. Muribacinus was contemporaneous with two other thylacinids: the much larger Nimbacinus dicksoni and Wabulacinus macknessi.

Other animals that lived alongside Muribacinus include the dasyuromorphs Barinya and Joculusium; the bandicoot Yarala; the koala Litokoala; the palorchestid Propalorchestes; the diprotodontids Nimbadon and Neohelos; the pygmy possum Burramys; the petauroid possum Djaludjangi; the ringtail possums Marlu and Paljara; the pilkipildrid possum Djilgaringa; the phalangerid possums Onirocuscus and Trichosurus; the musky rat-kangaroo Hypsiprymnodon; the propleopine Ekaltadeta; the potoroid Bettongia; and the macropodids Bulungamaya and Wanburoo.

=== Paleoecology ===
Writing in 1995, Wroe noted that, despite being roughly comparable in size to the tiger quoll (Dasyurus maculatus), Muribacinus wasn't capable of dispatching prey as large or larger than it as it lacks robust protoconids and relatively advanced brachycephalisation. Instead, the author suggested that Muribacinus likely preyed on small vertebrates and speculated that it filled an arboreal niche. However, an undescribed skeleton of the closely related and similarly aged Nimbacinus suggests that early thylacinids may have instead been cursorial.
