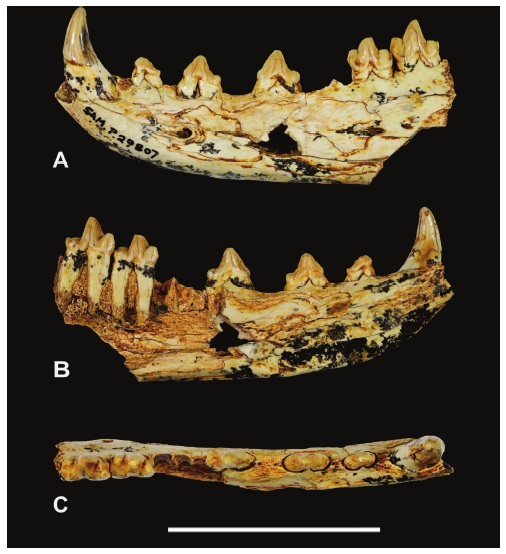
- Holotype left dentary

Scientific classification
- Kingdom: Animalia
- Phylum: Chordata
- Class: Mammalia
- Infraclass: Marsupialia
- Order: Dasyuromorphia
- Family: †Thylacinidae
- Genus: †Thylacinus
- Species: †T. yorkellus

Binomial name
- †Thylacinus yorkellus Yates, 2015

= Thylacinus yorkellus =

Thylacinus yorkellus Temporal range: Late Miocene or Early Pliocene, 5.3–3.6 Ma

Extinct species of marsupial

Thylacinus yorkellus is an extinct species of carnivorous marsupial from South Australia that lived during the Late Miocene or Early Pliocene. It is sister species to the recently extinct Thylacinus cynocephalus, the Tasmanian tiger, both of which existed on mainland Australia.

== History and naming ==
In 1992, Neville Pledge briefly reported on an incomplete left dentary (SAM P29807) of a thylacinid from the Curramulka Local Fauna of Corra-Lynn Cave, South Australia. Pledge remarked on the possibility of a new species but decided not to name it. Following the discovery of additional remains, Adam Yates, in 2015, made the jaw bone the holotype specimen of the new species Thylacinus yorkellus. An isolated right lower third molar (SAM P38799) was made the paratype.

The specific epithet combines the name of the region it was discovered, the Yorke Peninsula, and the Latin ellus, a diminutive suffix that denotes a species that was smaller than Thylacinus cynocephalus.

== Description ==
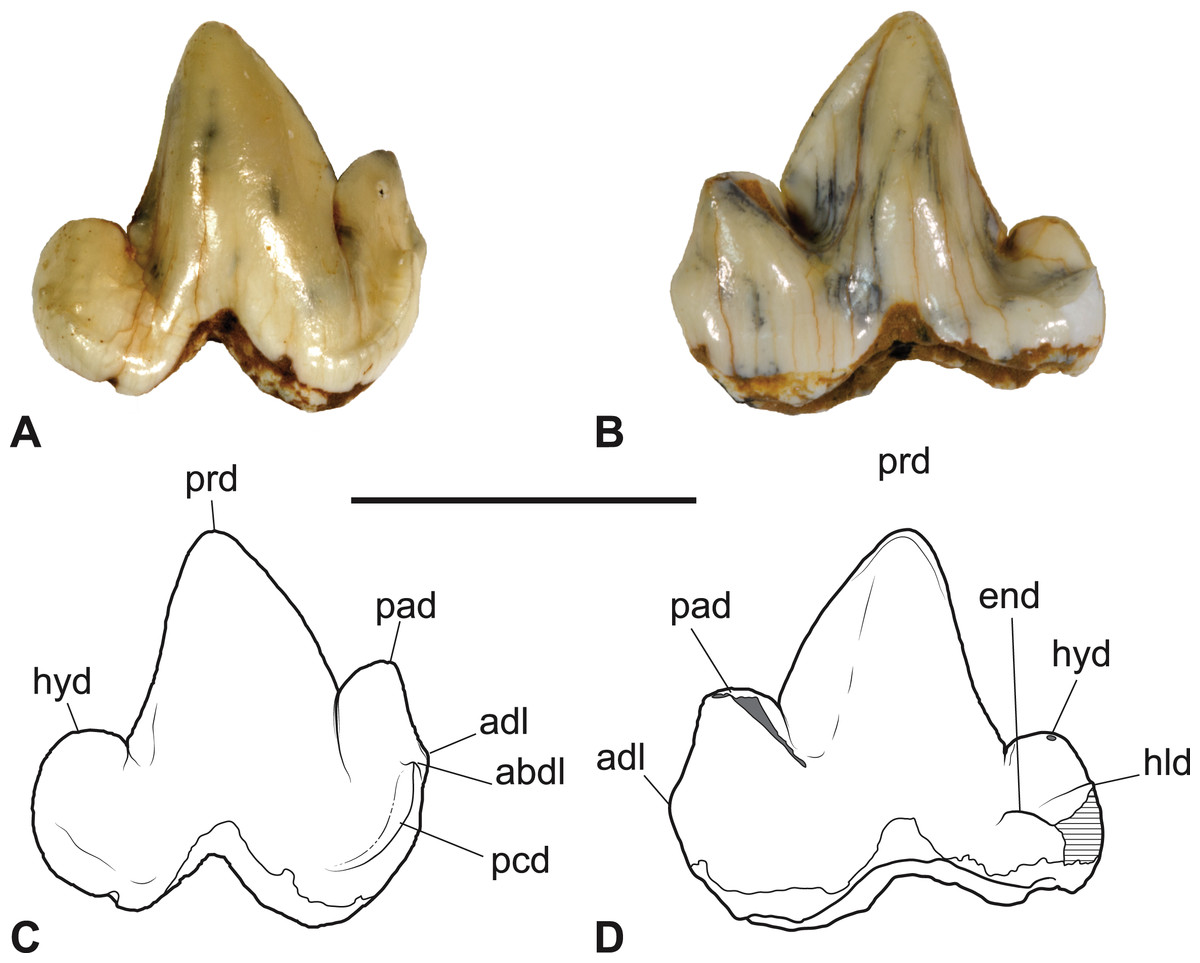
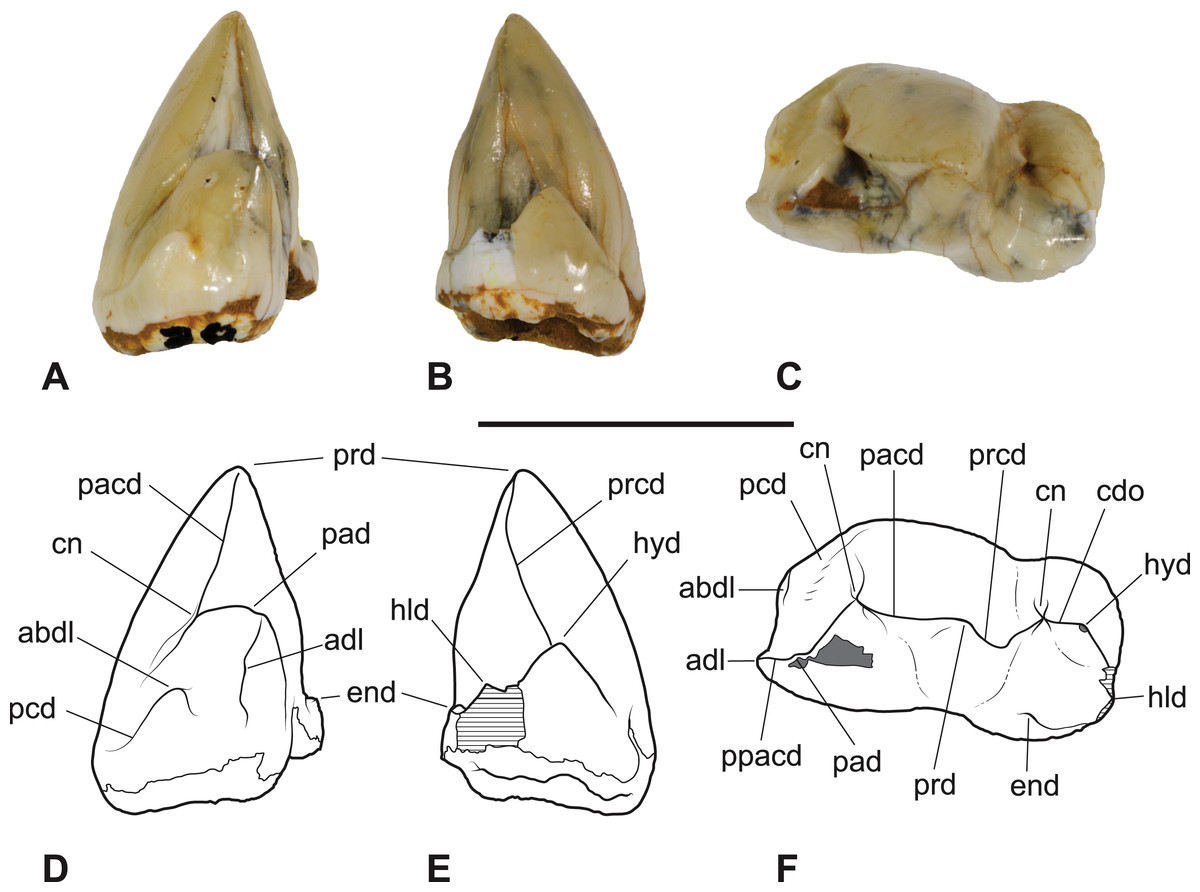
Paratype tooth of Thylacinus yorkellus seen from five different angles.

Thylacinus yorkellus is characterised by two autapomorphies: the lower molars possess a precingulid that ends in a cuspidule on the anterobuccal (nearest to the front of the cheek) face of the paraconid; and a majority of the premolars and molars have a small, forward facing cuspidule.

The dentary retains three premolars, two molars, a canine and an incisor alveoli. It is compressed transversely (from side to side) and lacks a torus on the ventrobuccal margin. Three small openings called mental foramina can be seen from the side of the jaw, located below the second premolar, and the second and third molar respectively. A wide gap (diastema) is present between each of the premolars as well as between the third premolar and first molar. The canine is angled vertically and slightly recurves lingually (towards the tongue) at the tip. The premolars gradually increase in size towards the back of the dentary. All of the molars have a deep, strongly-developed carnassial notch. Unlike in more basal taxa, the molars of T. yorkellus lack metaconids.

Yates (2015) calculated the weight for two known specimens using regression functions applied to dasyuromorphian data. The holotype and paratype are noted as being 17.8 kg (39 lbs) and 15.9 kg (35 lbs) respectively. Rovinsky et al. (2019), however, gave a lower estimate of 14.5 kg (32 lbs) for the paratype.

== Classification ==
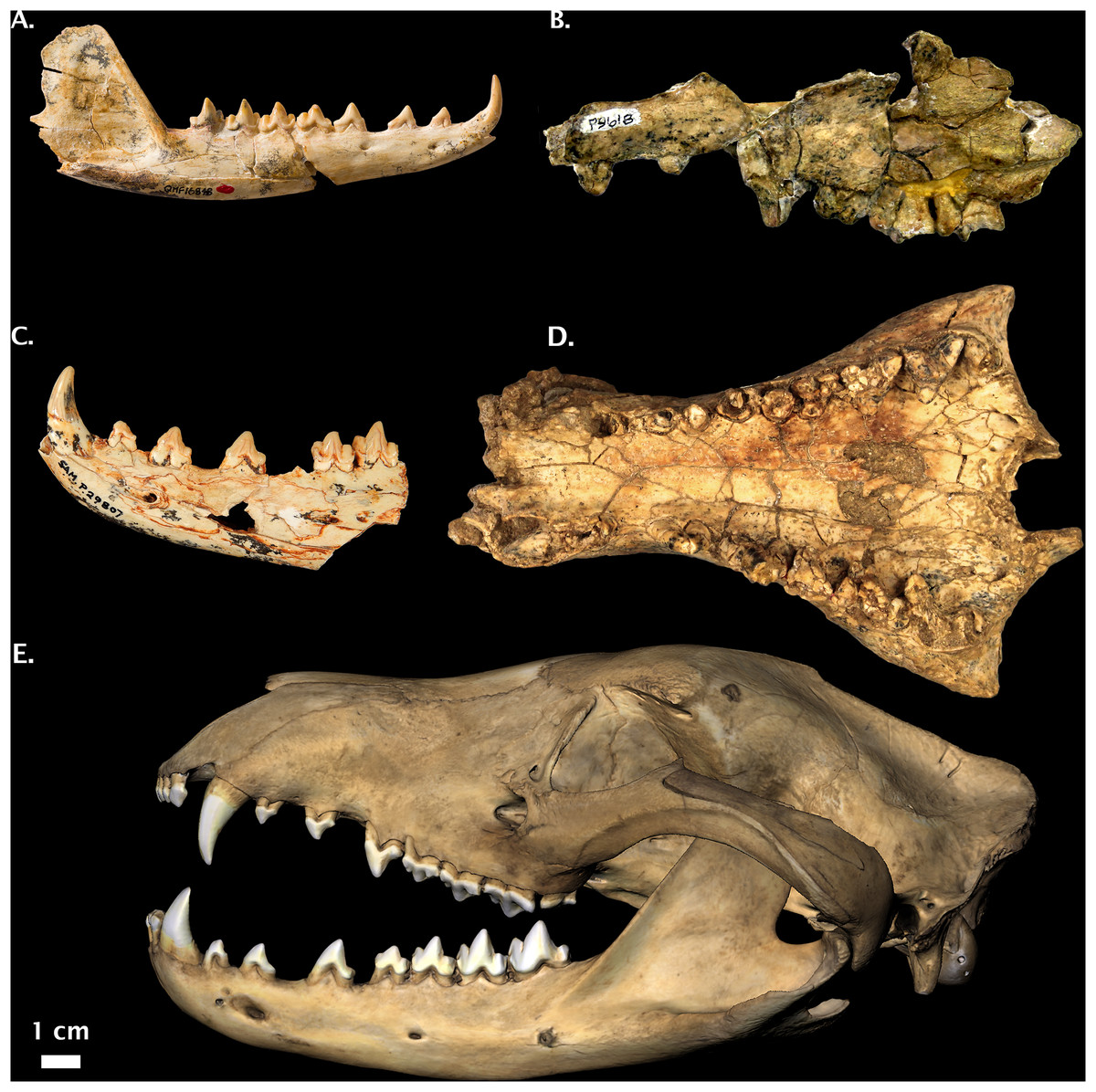
T. yorkellus (c) compared to other species of Thylacinus

In their 2015 study, Yates used a slightly modified character set from Yates (2014) in their cladistic analysis. The results found Thylacinus yorkellus to be the sister taxon to the recently extinct Thylacinus cynocephalus. The author refuted the idea that species of Thylacinus formed an anagenetic lineage, citing the short amount of time between each species and that all species display autapomorphies (unique derived features). Instead, all available evidence suggests that there was a modest but short-lived radiation of Thylacinus in the Late Miocene.

Rovinsky et al. (2019) recovered similar results to Yates (2015) in two out of the three cladistic analyses performed by the team. However, in one analysis, T. yorkellus formed a polytomy with Thylacinus megiriani and T. cynocephalus. This group is hypothesised to have split from all other thylacinids 13.5–8.0 million years ago.

- Thylacinidae
  - Badjcinus turnbulli
  - - - Nimbacinus dicksoni
      - - Muribacinus gadiyuli
        - Ngamalacinus timmulvaneyi
    - - Tyarrpecinus rothi
      - - Wabulacinus ridei
        - Thylacinus
          - Thylacinus macknessi
          - - Thylacinus potens
            - - Thylacinus megiriani
              - Thylacinus yorkellus
              - Thylacinus cynocephalus

== Paleoenvironment ==
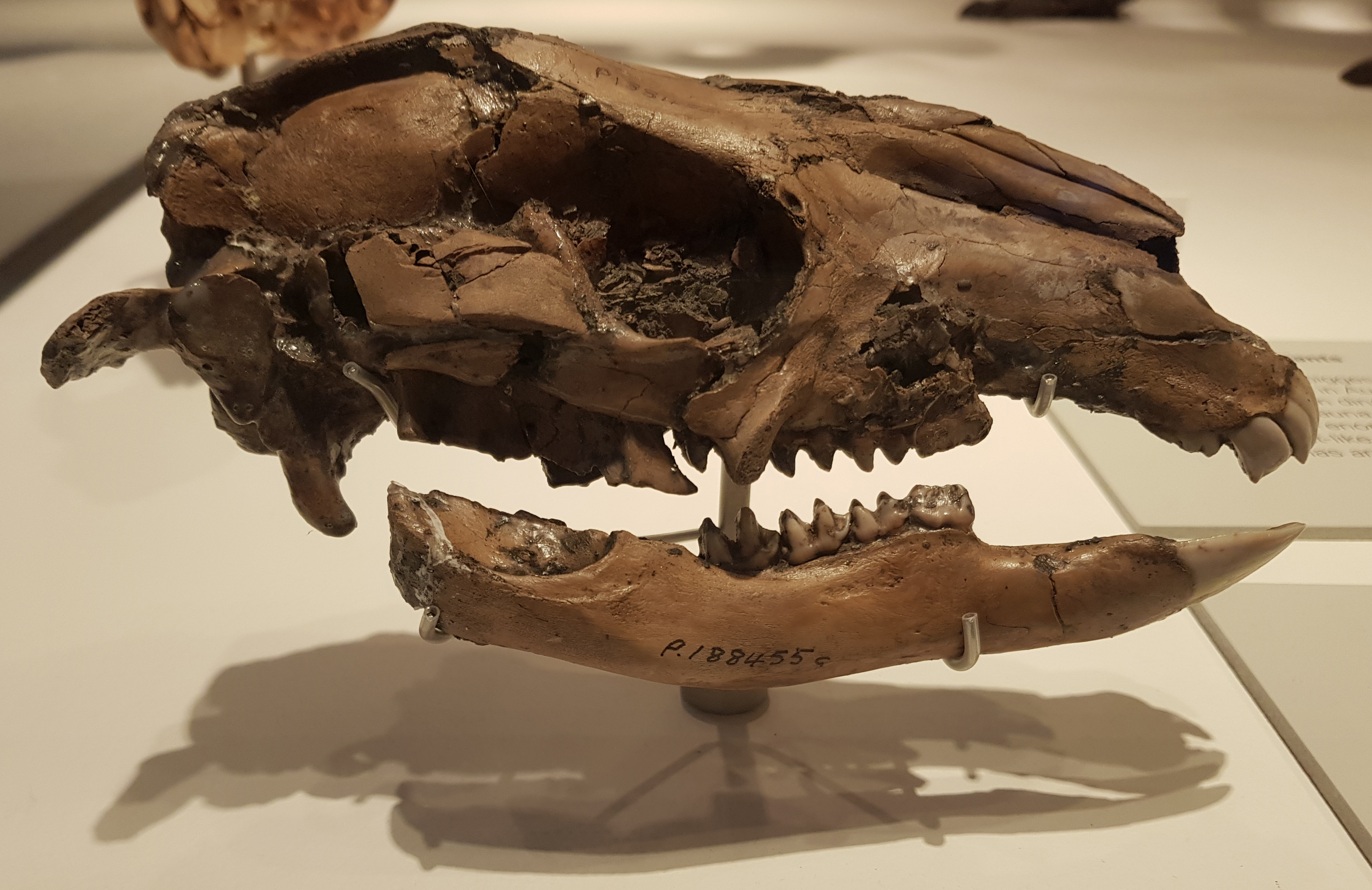
Fossils of the extinct macropod Protemnodon are known from the Curramulka Local Fauna.

The age of the Curramulka Local Fauna is uncertain and could either be Late Miocene or Early Pliocene. Some authors have argued that an Early Pliocene age is the likeliest, as suggested by the presence of certain macropodid genera that are not known from older rocks and the lack of rodent fossils. At the time, the area surrounding the cave was likely covered by forest and woodland.

The Curramulka Local Fauna preserves a diverse assemblage of mammals. Macropods are represented by both modern taxa such as a species of potoroo (Potorous sp.), and extinct forms such as Troposodon sp. cf. T. bowensis and a species of Protemnodon. Fossils of large herbivores such as an indeterminate zygomaturine and the palorchestid Palorchestes sp. cf. P. painei are also known from the site. The mammalian carnivores are represented by the dasyurids cf. Dasyuroides/Dasycercus sp. and cf. Glaucodon sp., and the thylacoleonid Thylacoleo sp. cf. T. hilli. Other mammals from the Curramulka Local Fauna include a species of wombat (Vombatus sp.), a species of Phascolonus and the possum Petaurus sp. cf. P. norfolcensis.
