= Wabulacinus =

Wabulacinus Temporal range: Early Miocene, 18.5–16.2 Ma Possible Late Oligocene record

Scientific classification
- Kingdom: Animalia
- Phylum: Chordata
- Class: Mammalia
- Infraclass: Marsupialia
- Order: Dasyuromorphia
- Family: †Thylacinidae
- Genus: †Wabulacinus; Muirhead, 1997

Type species
- †Wabulacinus ridei Muirhead, 1997

Other species
- †W. macknessi Muirhead, 1992

Synonyms
- Thylacinus macknessi Muirhead, 1992

Extinct species of marsupial

Wabulacinus is a poorly known genus of thylacinid marsupial from Early Miocene and possibly Late Oligocene deposits at the Riversleigh World Heritage Area in Queensland, Australia. It consists of two species, the type species W. ridei and W. macknessi. The snout of W. ridei was relatively broad, while W. macknessi had a noticeably elongated skull. Both species are thought to have been hypercarnivorous.

== History and naming ==
Wabulacinus was first described in 1997, emerging from an examination undertaken by Jeanette Muirhead of thylacinid fossils collected at the Riversleigh World Heritage Area in northwestern Queensland, Australia. The holotype specimen of W. ridei (QM F16851) is a fragment of the right maxilla. A second specimen, a left dentary fragment, was also assigned to the species as well. All fossils are a part of the paleontological collection at the Queensland Museum.

Five years prior to the description of the type species, Muirhead named a new species of Thylacinus, T. macknessi, based on material collected from Riversleigh deposits. At the time, only the back portion of the holotype dentary was known. In late 1993, the remaining half of this dentary was found in a limestone block and was later described in 1995. A study published by Churchill and colleagues in 2024 reassigned T. macknessi to the genus Wabulacinus, forming the new combination W. macknessi.

The generic name combines the Waanyi word "wabula" (long ago) and the Ancient Greek stem word "-kynos" (dog), alluding to its canid-like resemblance.

== Species ==
- Wabulacinus ridei

The type species, W. ridei was named in 1997 off of fossil remains discovered at the Camel Sputum site of Riversleigh, which dates to the Early Miocene. The species name was chosen to honour the contributions of David Ride to Australian palaeontology.

- Wabulacinus macknessi

Originally described as a species of Thylacinus, it is known only from one Riversleigh deposit, the Neville's Garden Site. It differs from the type species in aspects of the teeth. It was named after Brian Mackness, for their long-term commitment to Australian Vertebrate Palaeontology.

In 2003, Stephen Wroe reported a tooth referable to Wabulacinus sp. from older Riversleigh deposits, specifically the Late Oligocene White Hunter site.

== Description ==
The skull of Wabulacinus is poorly known, with the only preserved material being a maxilla, two dentaries and isolated teeth. Based on the short size of the dentary, W. ridei probably had a relatively broad snout compared to W. macknessi. The maxilla is represented by a fragment retaining the first two molars. The infraorbital foramen is positioned above where the posterior root of the third premolar would be, and is fully enclosed by the maxilla. Stylar cusps B and D on the first molar are completely absent, while the talon and protocone are both reduced in size. Both the preparacrista and centrocrista crests are almost parallel to each other. In addition, the first molar lacks a sulcus for the next molar. The second molar has a reduced stylar cusp D, while stylar cusp B is entirely absent. Posterior cingulids are present but poorly developed, whereas the buccal cingulids are well pronounced.

The dentary of W. macknessi has diastema (gap) between the canine and premolar teeth, with two mental foramina positioned under the posterior root of the first premolar and the anterior root of the third premolar. In contrast, W. ridei lacks diastema between its teeth and has only one mental foramen, which is just under the anterior root of the second premolar. Both the upper and lower dentition retain anterior cingula. In addition, all molars display a longitudinal blade formed by the hypoconid being positioned lingually (towards the tongue) from the paracristid. The crest in front of the paracone (known as the preparacrista) is almost parallel to the tooth row. Similar to species of Thylacinus, the metaconid cusp is vestigial or completely absent. The molars of W. ridei are completely void of an entoconid cusp, whereas W. macknessi retains an entoconid on all molars except for the fourth lower molar.

=== Size ===
W. macknessi was a fairly large thylacinid for its time, with an estimated body weight of 6.7-9.0 kg (14.8-19.8 lbs). W. ridei was only slightly smaller, weighing up to 5.3-7.8 kg (11.7-17.2 lbs).

== Classification ==
In its initial description, the position of Wabulacinus within Thylacinidae was tested by performing a single most parsimonious tree. The results of the tree found that it was the sister taxon of the genus Thylacinus. In 2014, palaeontologist Adam Yates also found support for this close relationship. In 2019, Rovinsky and colleagues conducted three phylogenetic analyses, with the first analysis also confirming this assignment. The second analysis, however, recovered it in a polytomy, whereas the third and final analysis found that it claded with Thylacinus potens and Tyarrpecinus as sister group to Thylacinus.

- - Thylacinidae
    - Badjcinus turnbulli
    - - - Nimbacinus dicksoni
        - - Muribacinus gadiyuli
          - Ngamalacinus timmulvaneyi
      - - Tyarrpecinus rothi
        - - Wabulacinus ridei
          - Thylacinus
            - "Thylacinus" macknessi
            - - Thylacinus potens
              - - Thylacinus megiriani
                - Thylacinus yorkellus
                - Thylacinus cynocephalus

Thylacinus macknessi was initially thought to have been the basalmost species of Thylacinus. However, most cladistic analyses, such as Murray & Megirian (2006a) and Yates (2014), have recovered a sister taxa relationship between it and the type species W. ridei. Churchill and colleagues (2024) showed support for this relationship in their phylogenetic analyses. As a result, the authors reassigned T. macknessi to Wabulacinus.

- - Thylacinidae
    - Muribacinus gadiyuli
    - - - - Ngamalacinus timmulvaneyi
          - Ngamalacinus nigelmarveni
        - - Badjcinus turnbulli
          - Nimbacinus dicksoni
          - Tyarrpecinus rothi
          - Badjcinus timfaulkneri
          - Nimbacinus peterbridgei
          - - - - Thylacinus macknessi
                - Wabulacinus ridei
              - Thylacinus
                - Thylacinus potens
                - - Thylacinus cynocephalus
                  - Thylacinus megiriani
                  - Thylacinus yorkellus

== Paleobiology ==
The type species, W. ridei, is known only from the Early Miocene Camel Sputum site of Riversleigh, which has been radiometrically dated to ~18.5-17.0 Ma. In contrast, fossils of W. macknessi have been recovered from the similarly aged Neville's Garden (18.5-17.7 Ma) and Mike's Menagerie sites (~18.5-16.2 Ma). During this period of time, Australia's climate would have been warm and permanently wet after shifting from a more cooler and drier setting in the Late Oligocene. The environment inhabited by Wabulacinus consisted of open rainforest habitat.

The Camel Sputum, Neville's Garden and Mike's Menagerie sites have also yielded the remains of the thylacinid Ngamalacinus timmulvaneyi, and the thylacoleonids Microleo, Lekaneleo roskellyae and Wakaleo schouteni. The two families of carnivorous marsupials likely did not compete with each other due to differences in both body size and vertical habitat segregation. Both species of Wabulacinus show adaptation towards hypercarnivory, such as the reduction of tooth complexity and elongation of the shearing crests. In addition, the relatively broad snout of W. ridei would have allowed it to chew more efficiently and to deliver a more powerful bite.
