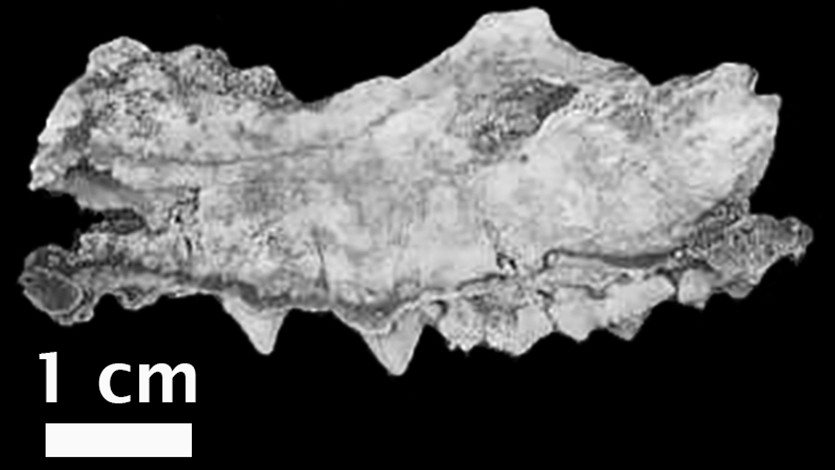
- Referred maxillary fragment of N. timmulvaneyi

Scientific classification
- Kingdom: Animalia
- Phylum: Chordata
- Class: Mammalia
- Infraclass: Marsupialia
- Order: Dasyuromorphia
- Family: †Thylacinidae
- Genus: †Ngamalacinus; Muirhead, 1997

Type species
- †Ngamalacinus timmulvaneyi Muirhead, 1997

Other species
- †N. nigelmarveni Churchill, Archer & Hand, 2024

= Ngamalacinus =

Ngamalacinus Temporal range: 26–16.2 Ma Late Oligocene to Early Miocene

Extinct species of marsupial

Ngamalacinus is an extinct genus of thylacinid that lived in Australia from about 26 to 16 million years ago. Its fossils are solely known from the Riversleigh World Heritage Area in Queensland. Two species are currently known, the Early Miocene N. timmulvaneyi and the Late Oligocene N. nigelmarveni. In appearance it resembled a dog with a long snout. Its molar teeth were specialized for carnivory, the cups and crest were reduced or elongated to give the molars a cutting blade.

== History and naming ==
Ngamalacinus was first described in 1997, emerging from an examination undertaken by Jeanette Muirhead of thylacinid fossils collected at the Riversleigh World Heritage Area in northwestern Queensland, Australia. The holotype specimen of N. timmulvaneyi (QM F16853) is a dentary fragment belonging to an immature individual. Additional remains, such as a maxilla and an isolated premolar, have also been referred to the species. All fossil material are a part of the paleontological collection at the Queensland Museum.

In 2024, a new, older species of Ngamalacinus, N. nigelmarveni, was described from a broken left dentary. It hails from slightly earlier Riversleigh deposits.

The generic name combines the Waanyi word "ngamala" (died out) and the Ancient Greek stem word "-kynos" (dog), alluding to its resemblance to the canid family.

== Species ==
- Ngamalacinus timmulvaneyi

The type species, N. timmulvaneyi was named in 1997 based on fossils discovered at the Inaybeance and Camel Sputum sites at Riversleigh, which both date to the Early Miocene. It was named after Tim Mulvaney, for their long time support towards research of Riversleigh fauna.

- Ngamalacinus nigelmarveni

Named in 2024, this species is known from the Late Oligocene White Hunter site of Riversleigh. N. nigelmarveni can be differentiated from N. timmulvaneyi in aspects of the dentition. The species name honours famed British wildlife television presenter Nigel Marven.

== Description ==
The skull of Ngamalacinus is poorly understood, with only a maxilla and two dentaries being known. The maxilla, represented by a fragment, retains most of the molars and premolars. Although not preserved, the upper canines were likely large given how deep its roots extend into the maxillary bone. A small gap (diastema) occurs between each premolar. Compared to other thylacinids, its teeth aren't as long from front-to-back (anteroposteriorly). Stylar cusps B and D are small but distinct on the upper molars. In addition, the upper molar crests are angled at a narrow degree. Unlike Wabulacinus, the infraorbital foramen is positioned more towards the back of the maxilla.

Only two dentaries are known, both of which are broken and preserve most of the molars. The coronoid process in both dentaries is angled at 120°. No gaps are present between each tooth. The teeth of N. nigelmarveni have a broad talonid and, on at least the fourth molar, trigonid basin. On all molars, the metaconid cusp has been reduced in size and is positioned more towards the back of the tooth. In addition, a distal ridge (known as a posterior cingulid) is present on all of the teeth. The fourth molar lacks an entoconid entirely, whilst also possessing a large hypoconulid.

=== Size ===
N. timmulvaneyi was a fairly large thylacinid for its time, weighing up to 5.7-8.4 kg (12.6-18.5 lbs). N. nigelmarveni, however, was considerably smaller, with an estimated body weight of 5.1 kg (11.2 lbs).

== Classification ==
In its initial description, the position of Ngamalacinus within Thylacinidae was tested by performing a single most parsimonious tree. The results of the tree found that it was sister taxon to the genera Wabulacinus and Thylacinus. Subsequent studies, however, have attained conflicting results. Both Murray & Megirian (2000) and Yates (2015) found that it claded with Badjcinus as a sister group to all other thylacinids with the exception of Muribacinus. In at least two out of the three phylogenetic analyses performed by Rovinsky and colleagues (2019), Ngamalacinus claded with the Early-Middle Miocene taxa Muribaicnus and Nimbacinus. In the other analysis, it was found to be in a basal polytomy.

- - Thylacinidae
    - Badjcinus turnbulli
    - - - Nimbacinus dicksoni
        - - Muribacinus gadiyuli
          - Ngamalacinus timmulvaneyi
      - - Tyarrpecinus rothi
        - - Wabulacinus ridei
          - Thylacinus
            - Thylacinus macknessi
            - - Thylacinus potens
              - - Thylacinus megiriani
                - Thylacinus yorkellus
                - Thylacinus cynocephalus

In the description of Ngamalacinus nigelmarveni, three phylogenetic analyses were performed to test the relationships of the newly named species. Both the tip-and-node dated Bayesian analysis and strict consensus maximum parsimony showed support for its generic assignment and found the two species to be a part of a basal polytomy. The 50% majority rule consensus tree recovered similar results but differed in that instead of being within a polytomy it was sister group to one.

- - Thylacinidae
    - Muribacinus gadiyuli
    - - - - Ngamalacinus timmulvaneyi
          - Ngamalacinus nigelmarveni
        - - Badjcinus turnbulli
          - Nimbacinus dicksoni
          - Tyarrpecinus rothi
          - Badjcinus timfaulkneri
          - Nimbacinus peterbridgei
          - - - - Thylacinus macknessi
                - Wabulacinus ridei
              - Thylacinus
                - Thylacinus potens
                - - Thylacinus cynocephalus
                  - Thylacinus megiriani
                  - Thylacinus yorkellus

== Paleobiology ==
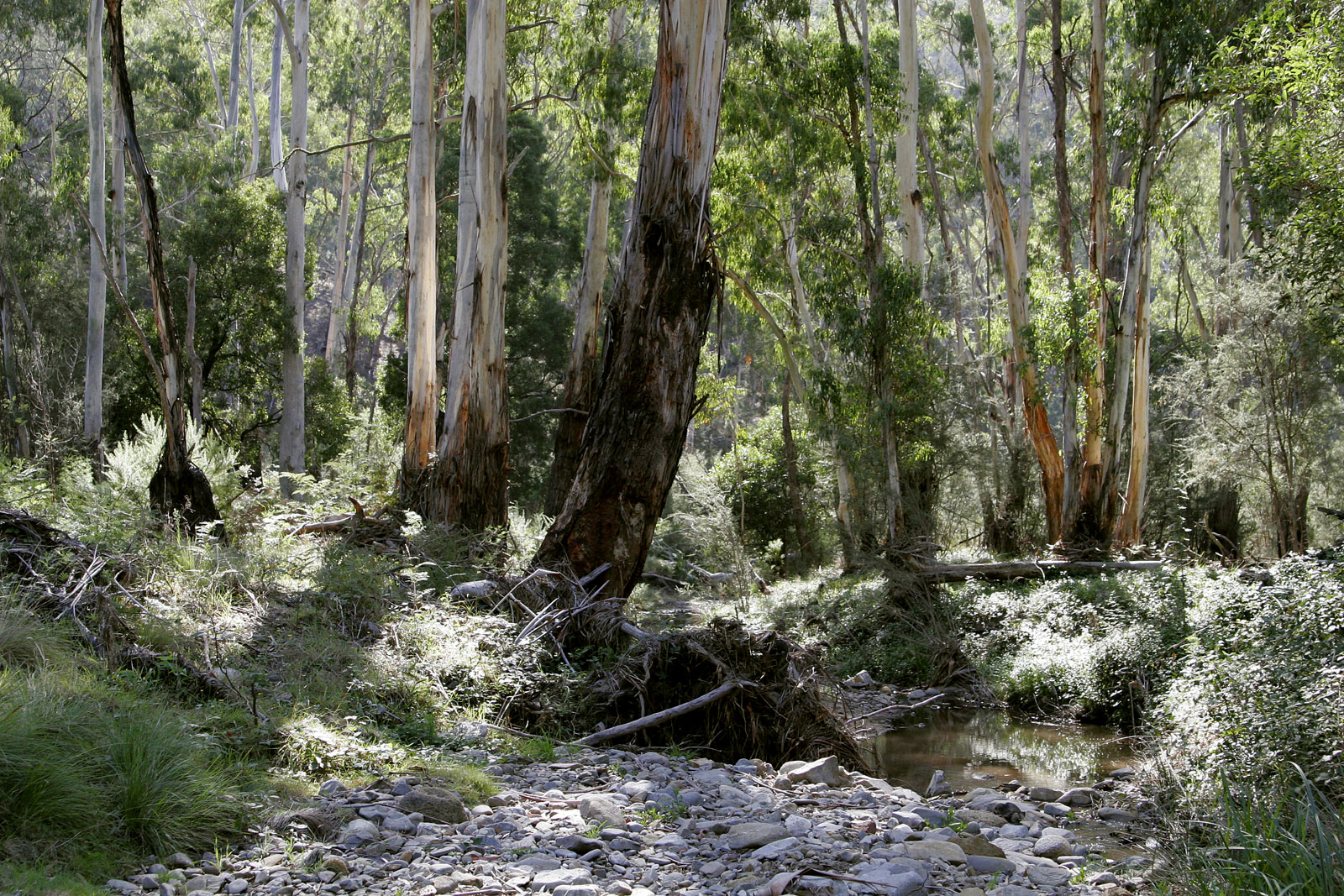
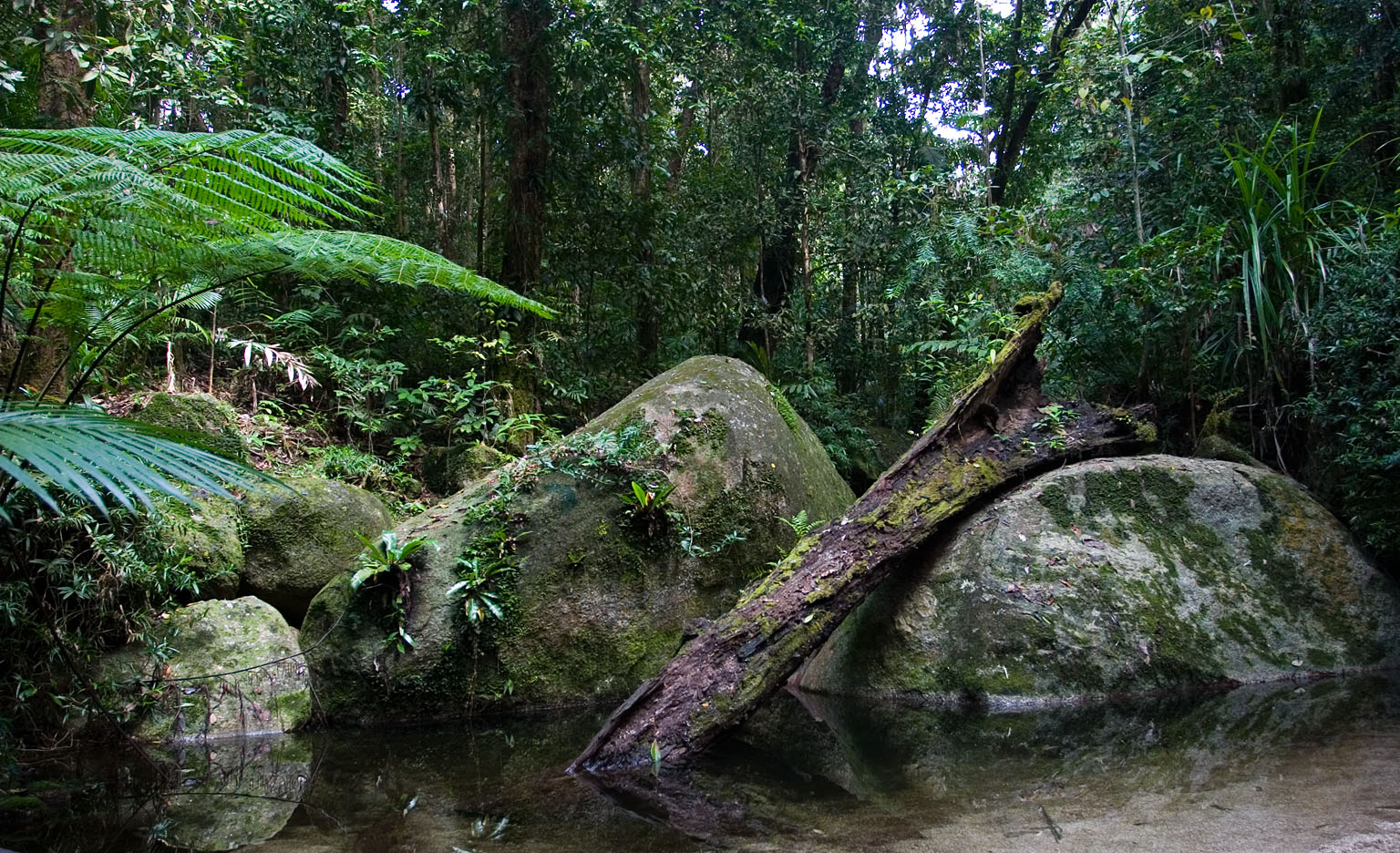
Species of Ngamalacinus inhabited the Late Oligocene woodlands and Early Miocene rainforests of Riversleigh.

Ngamalacinus nigelmarveni is known exclusively from the Late Oligocene White Hunter site of Riversleigh, which has a date range of ~26-23 Ma. During this period of time, Australia's climate would have been cool and dry before shifting to a more warmer and wetter setting in the Early Miocene. The environment inhabited by N. nigelmarveni consisted of open temperate forests or woodlands, with patches of rainforest growing around forest pools and watercourses. Plant fossils indicate the presence of deciduous vine thickets and sclerophyllous vegetation. Living alongside N. nigelmarveni were the thylacinids Nimbacinus peterbridgei and Badjcinus turnbulli, and the thylacoleonids Wakaleo schouteni and Lekaneleo roskellyae. The two families of carnivorous marsupials likely did not compete with each other due to differences in both body size and vertical habitat segregation. The teeth of N. nigelmarveni show adaptations towards hypercarnivory and were well equipped for longitudinal slicing.

Fossils of N. timmulvaneyi are only known from two Early Miocene deposits, the Camel Sputum and Inabeyance sites. The Camel Sputum site has been radiometrically dated to ~18.5–17.0 Ma, while the age of the Inabeyance site is thought to have been ~18.5-16.2 Ma. Both sites are interpreted as being open rainforest habitat. Contemporaneous with N. timmulvaneyi was the similarly-sized, hypercarnivorous thylacinid Wabulacinus ridei. N. timmulvaneyi is thought to have been an unspecialised faunivore that fed on invertebrates and small vertebrates.
