= Riversleigha =

Riversleigha Temporal range: Miocene

Scientific classification
- Kingdom: Animalia
- Phylum: Chordata
- Class: Mammalia
- Order: Chiroptera
- Family: Hipposideridae
- Genus: †Riversleigha; Hand, 1998
- Species: †R. williamsi

Binomial name
- †Riversleigha williamsi Hand et al. 1998

Extinct species of bat

Riversleigha williamsi is a species of hipposiderid bat discovered in fossil deposits located the Riversleigh World Heritage Area in the north of Australia.

== Taxonomy ==
The description of Riversleigha williamsi was published in 1998 by Suzanne J. Hand, the author separating the novel species by erecting a new genus, Riversleigha. The type material was obtained at Bitesantennary Site, a rich deposit of previously unknown chiropteran taxa, and the ninth species to be discovered by the researchers at the Riversleigh fossil area from which the genus name is derived. The specific epithet was nominated by the author for Stephan Williams, who had assisted in the processing of large amounts of fossiliferous limestone extracted from the Bitesantennary Site, the species type location.

== Description ==
Riversleigha was a large species of hipposiderid Old World leaf-nosed bat. These are found in Europe and other regions of the Old World and are distinguished by an elaborate fleshy structure that assists in echolocation. The characteristics of this species indicate they were capable of consuming invertebrates protected by hard carapaces. The microbat is only exceeded in size in the Riversleigh fauna by the megadermatid species of Macroderma.

The type specimens are a skull with some intact dentition and other cranial material. The very elongated rostrum is around two-thirds the length of the almost spherical braincase within the bat's relatively narrow and long skull. The great size of the wings, inferred by the size of the skull, indicate that it was less able to manoeuvre than other microbats of the rainforest, which hunt within the canopy, instead foraging over and around the dense vegetation. The prey is likely to have included hard-shelled beetles, which Riversleigha williamsi could crush with its teeth, and the parasitic wasps, weevils, and moths of the local fauna. The size and morphology of the skull also indicates that the sound frequency used in echolocation was relatively low. The sagittal and lambdoidal crests of R. williamsi were well developed.
