= Xenorhinos =

Scientific classification
- Kingdom: Animalia
- Phylum: Chordata
- Class: Mammalia
- Order: Chiroptera
- Family: Hipposideridae
- Genus: †Xenorhinos; Hand, 1998

Species
- †Xenorhinos halli Hand, 1998; †Xenorhinos bhatnagari Hand et al., 2023

Extinct species of bat

Xenorhinos is a genus of bat that existed in the early Miocene. It was discovered at a fossil deposit of the Riversleigh World Heritage Area in the north of Australia. There are two known species, Xenorhinos halli and X. bhatnagari.

== Taxonomy ==
The description of Xenorhinos halli was published in 1998 by a senior researcher at the Riversleigh fossil sites Suzanne Hand, separated from other bats of the hipposiderid family by a new genus. A holotype was selected from fossilised material in a deposition at the Bitesantennary Site, a skull with some intact premolars. All the specimens included in the first description were obtained at the type locality. Later, the species was moved to the separate family Rhinonycteridae, and a second species, X. bhatnagari, was named in 2023.

The genus name Xenorhinos was nominated in reference to the strangeness of the palate and rostrum, a broad and short feature that was unique amongst the hipposiderid family. The specific epithet honours Leslie S. Hall, a professor at the University of Queensland, who was noted for his contributions to the study of chiropterans.

== Description ==
A microchiropteran allied to the hipposiderid family, known as old world leaf-nosed and later trident bats, which use echolocation to hunt at night. The extremely short palate, broad rostrum, and other cranial proportions distinguished the new taxon from others of the family. The closest living relative is thought to be the Persian leaf-nosed bat Triaenops persicus.

== Distribution ==
Xenorhinos halli was discovered in a fossil deposit known as the Bitesantennary site, a diverse assemblage of bat species and other Riversleigh fauna of the time.
