= William D. Turnbull =

American paleontologist

William D. Turnbull (1922-2011) was an American paleontologist associated with the Chicago Field Museum. He published over 100 papers on mammals, continuing after his retirement as the museum's curator of mammals. He searched in Australia for evidence of recently extinct species, and made frequent expeditions to sites at the Washakie Formation in southwest Wyoming. His studies are considered significant contributions to the paleontology and biogeography of dinosaurs and Eocene mammals.

A species of marsupial in the Thylacinidae family, an ancestor of the Tasmanian tiger Thylacinus cynocephalus, was named Badjcinus turnbulli in honour of Turnbull's contributions to Australian palaeontology.
