= Australian Fossil Mammal Sites (Riversleigh / Naracoorte) =

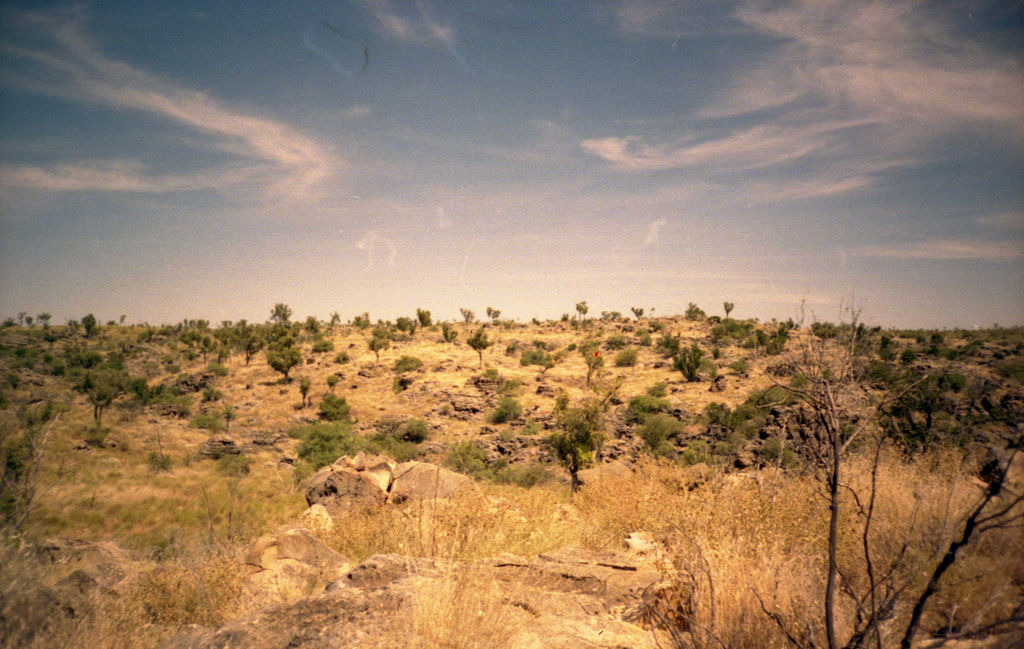
Riversleigh, Queensland, Australia

Australian Fossil Mammal Sites (Riversleigh / Naracoorte) is a combined listing in the UNESCO World Heritage Sites for two places in Australia known for their extensive fossil remains.

The UNESCO listing is for two separate areas where fossils from the Cenozoic Era have been found:

- Australian Fossil Mammal Sites (Riversleigh) in Queensland
- Australian Fossil Mammal Sites (Naracoorte) in South Australia

Riversleigh and Naracoorte are considered to be among the world's 10 greatest fossil sites and both locations are notable for the extreme diversity and quality of preservation of their fossils, which illustrate the evolution of mammals in Australia over the last 20 million years and demonstrate how marsupials adapted to climate changes over the last 170,000 years.

The Australian Fossil Mammal Sites (Riversleigh/Naracoorte) was inscribed on the UNESCO World Heritage List in 1994 for its outstanding universal value, and was added to the Australian National Heritage List on 21 May 2007, as a collective area of outstanding value for Australia.
