= Wabanbara =

Wabanbara Temporal range: Middle Miocene

Scientific classification
- Kingdom: Animalia
- Phylum: Chordata
- Class: Reptilia
- Order: Testudines
- Suborder: Pleurodira
- Family: Chelidae
- Genus: †Wabanbara
- Species: †W. ringtailensis

Binomial name
- †Wabanbara ringtailensis White et al., 2025

Extinct genus of turtles

Wabanbara is an extinct genus of chelid turtle that lived during the Middle Miocene.

== Distribution ==
Wabanbara ringtailensis is known from the Riversleigh World Heritage Area in Queensland, Australia.
