= Australlus =

Australlus Temporal range: Late Oligocene to Middle Miocene, 25–15 Ma

Scientific classification
- Kingdom: Animalia
- Phylum: Chordata
- Class: Aves
- Order: Gruiformes
- Family: Rallidae
- Genus: Australlus; Worthy & Boles, 2011

Species
- See text

Extinct genus of birds

Australlus is an extinct genus of birds in the rail family. It was described from a series of Late Oligocene to Middle Miocene fossil material found at Riversleigh in north-western Queensland, Australia. The genus was erected following reassessment of the relationships of the previously described species Gallinula disneyi Boles 2005 when new material became available. The genus name comes from the Latin australis (“southern”), and rallus (“rail”). It contains two described flightless species:

- A. disneyi (Boles, 2005) Worthy & Boles, 2011 (type species)
- A. gagensis Worthy & Boles, 2011
