= Sulcatidens =

Sulcatidens Temporal range: Early Miocene 23.03–15.97 Ma

Scientific classification
- Kingdom: Animalia
- Phylum: Chordata
- Class: Reptilia
- Order: Squamata
- Suborder: Iguania
- Family: Agamidae
- Genus: †Sulcatidens; Covacevich et al., 1990
- Species: †S. quadratus

Binomial name
- †Sulcatidens quadratus Covacevich et al., 1990

Extinct species of agamid lizard

Sulcatidens is an extinct genus of agamid lizard from the Early Miocene of Australia. Fossils are known exclusively from the Riversleigh World Heritage Area in Queensland. It contains only one species, S. quadratus.

== Discovery and naming ==
The holotype specimen, QM F18010, of Sulcatidens was discovered from the 'Wayne's Wok' site at the Riversleigh World Heritage Area, in the Boodjamulla National Park of north-western Queensland. It consists of a partial maxilla retaining teeth. In addition, an incomplete maxilla was also referred to the species. It was described alongside other agamid material from Riversleigh by Covacevich et al. in 1990.

The generic name is derived from the Latin word sulcare ("to furrow"), in reference to the notches in the middle of the posterior maxillary teeth. The specific name comes from the Latin quadratus ("to make square"), which refers to the square-like shape of the posterior maxillary teeth.

== Description ==
The teeth of Sulcatidens, and all other agamids, are described as acrodont, as they are attached to the apex of the jaw bone. The four posterior most maxillary teeth are roughly square in appearance and situated close to one another. When viewed occlusally, the teeth have a flattened labial surface. It differs from all other agamids in that the posterior most maxillary teeth have distal edges that are notched into the mesial edge of the preceding tooth.

== Paleobiology ==
Sulcatidens is known exclusively from the 'Wayne's Wok' site at Riversleigh, which dates to the Early Miocene. At the time, Riversleigh was covered in a permanently wet and closed canopy rainforest environment.
