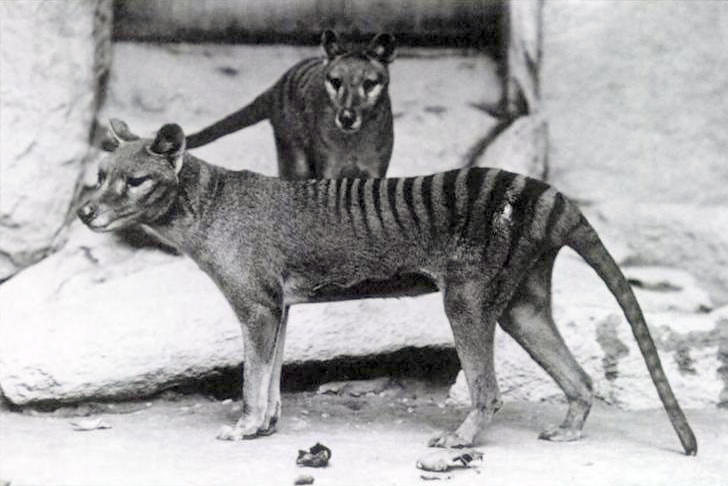
- Thylacine
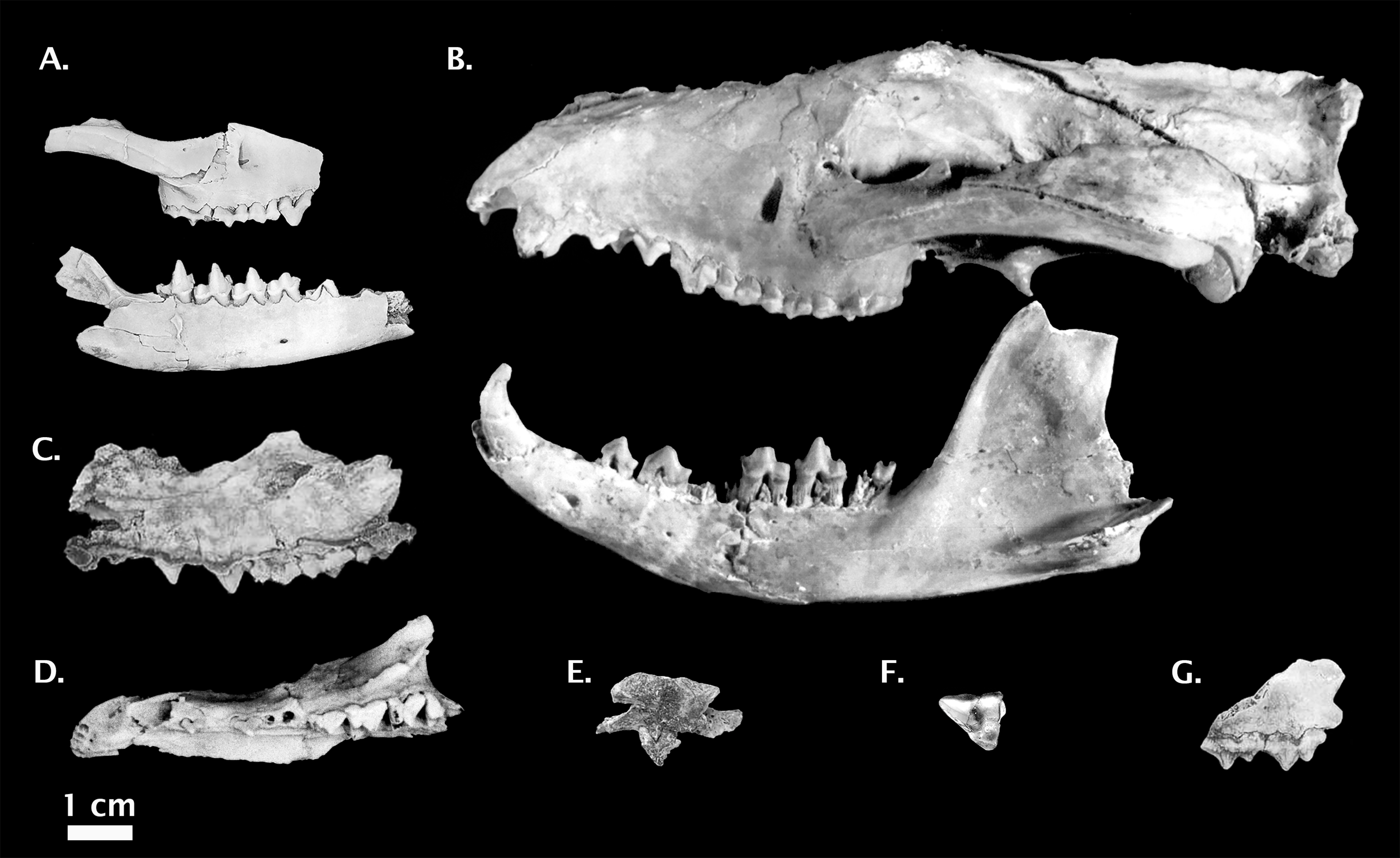
- Non-Thylacinus thylacinids, including Nimbacinus (top right)

Scientific classification
- Kingdom: Animalia
- Phylum: Chordata
- Class: Mammalia
- Infraclass: Marsupialia
- Order: Dasyuromorphia
- Family: †Thylacinidae; C.L. Bonaparte, 1838

Genera
- Badjcinus; Maximucinus; Muribacinus; Mutpuracinus?; Ngamalacinus; Nimbacinus; Thylacinus; Tyarrpecinus; Wabulacinus

= Thylacinidae =

Thylacinidae Temporal range: Late Oligocene - Holocene 28–0.00008 Ma

Extinct family of marsupials

Thylacinidae is an extinct family of carnivorous marsupials from the order Dasyuromorphia. The only species to survive into modern times was the thylacine (Thylacinus cynocephalus), which became extinct in 1936.

The consensus of authors prior to 1982 was that the thylacinid family were related to the Borhyaenidae, a group of South American predators, also extinct, that exhibited many similar characteristics of dentition. A review published in 1982 compared the skeletal structure of these groups, concluding the tarsal bones show greater affinity with the dasyurmorphs, strongly supporting the later theory that any dental similarities emerged independently via convergent evolution. Thylacinidae is currently considered to be sister to all other lineages within Dasyuromorpha, and is estimated to have split from other dasyuromorphs around 42-36 million years ago.

The earliest thylacinid, Badjcinus from the Late Oligocene around 28 million years ago, is estimated to have been around 1.7 to 3.1 kilograms (3.7 to 6.8 lb) in weight, comparable to a living tiger quoll. Early thylacinids were unspecialised faunivores. The family exhibited its greatest diversity during the Miocene epoch, when there were several separate lineages of contemporaneous thylacinids, most of which were considerably smaller than the living thylacine. The genus Thylacinus emerged during the Early Miocene around 16 million years ago, and after the beginning of the Pliocene was the only living thylacinid genus. Over time members of the genus Thylacinus showed an increase in body and increased adaptation to hypercarnivory.

== Phylogeny ==
Cladogram after Rovinsky et al. (2019):

- Thylacinidae
  - Badjcinus turnbulli
  - - - Nimbacinus dicksoni
      - - Muribacinus gadiyuli
        - Ngamalacinus timmulvaneyi
    - - Tyarrpecinus rothi
      - - Wabulacinus ridei
        - Thylacinus
          - Thylacinus macknessi
          - - Thylacinus potens
            - - Thylacinus megiriani
              - Thylacinus yorkellus
              - Thylacinus cynocephalus
