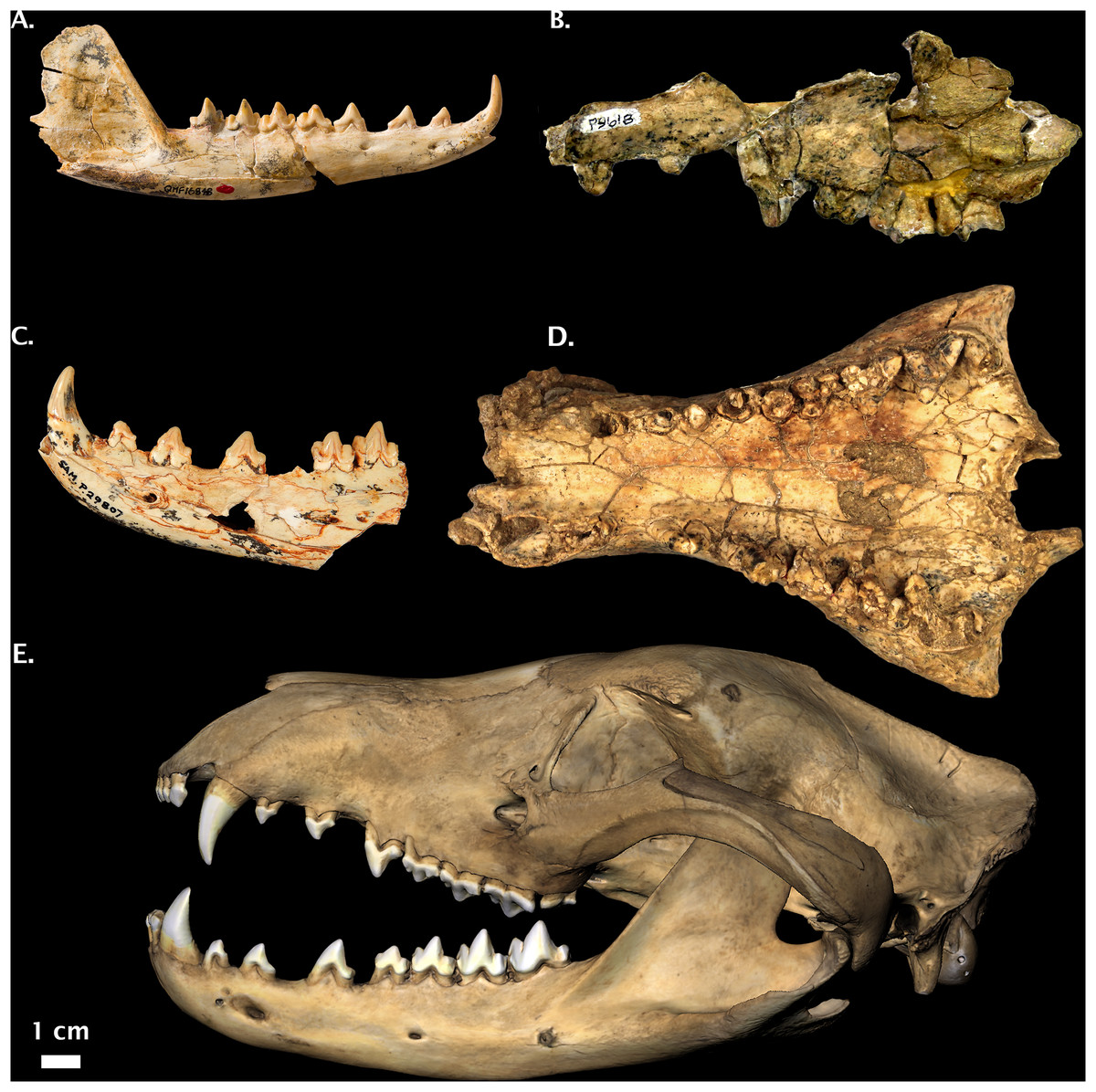
- Fossils of all Thylacinus species (B-D), compared to Wabulacinus macknessi (A)

Scientific classification
- Kingdom: Animalia
- Phylum: Chordata
- Class: Mammalia
- Infraclass: Marsupialia
- Order: Dasyuromorphia
- Family: †Thylacinidae
- Genus: †Thylacinus; Temminck, 1824

Type species
- Didelphis cynocephalus Harris, 1808

Species
- Thylacinus cynocephalus; Thylacinus megiriani; Thylacinus potens; Thylacinus yorkellus

= Thylacinus =

Thylacinus Temporal range: Miocene–Holocene

Extinct genus of marsupials

Thylacinus is a genus of extinct carnivorous marsupials in the family Thylacinidae. The only recent member was the thylacine (Thylacinus cynocephalus), commonly also known as the Tasmanian tiger or Tasmanian wolf. The last known Tasmanian tiger was in the Beaumaris Zoo in Tasmania, eventually dying in 1936. The earliest known member of the genus, Thylacinus macknessi appeared during the Early Miocene, around 16 million years ago, and was smaller than the modern thylacine, with a body mass of about 6.7–9.0 kilograms (14.8–19.8 lb). Thylacinus represented the only extant genus of the family after the beginning of the Pliocene around 5 million years ago. Over time members of the genus saw an increase in body mass and a greater adaption to hypercarnivory in their dental morphology.

A tooth referable to Thylacinus was collected from the Late Oligocene Wayne's Wok site at the Riversleigh World Heritage Area, making it the oldest record of the genus.

== Phylogeny ==
Below is a phylogeny by Yates (2015) on the relationships of Thylacinus.

- Thylacinus
  - Thylacinus macknessi
  - - Thylacinus potens
    - - Thylacinus megiriani
      - - Thylacinus yorkellus
        - - Thylacinus cynocephalus
