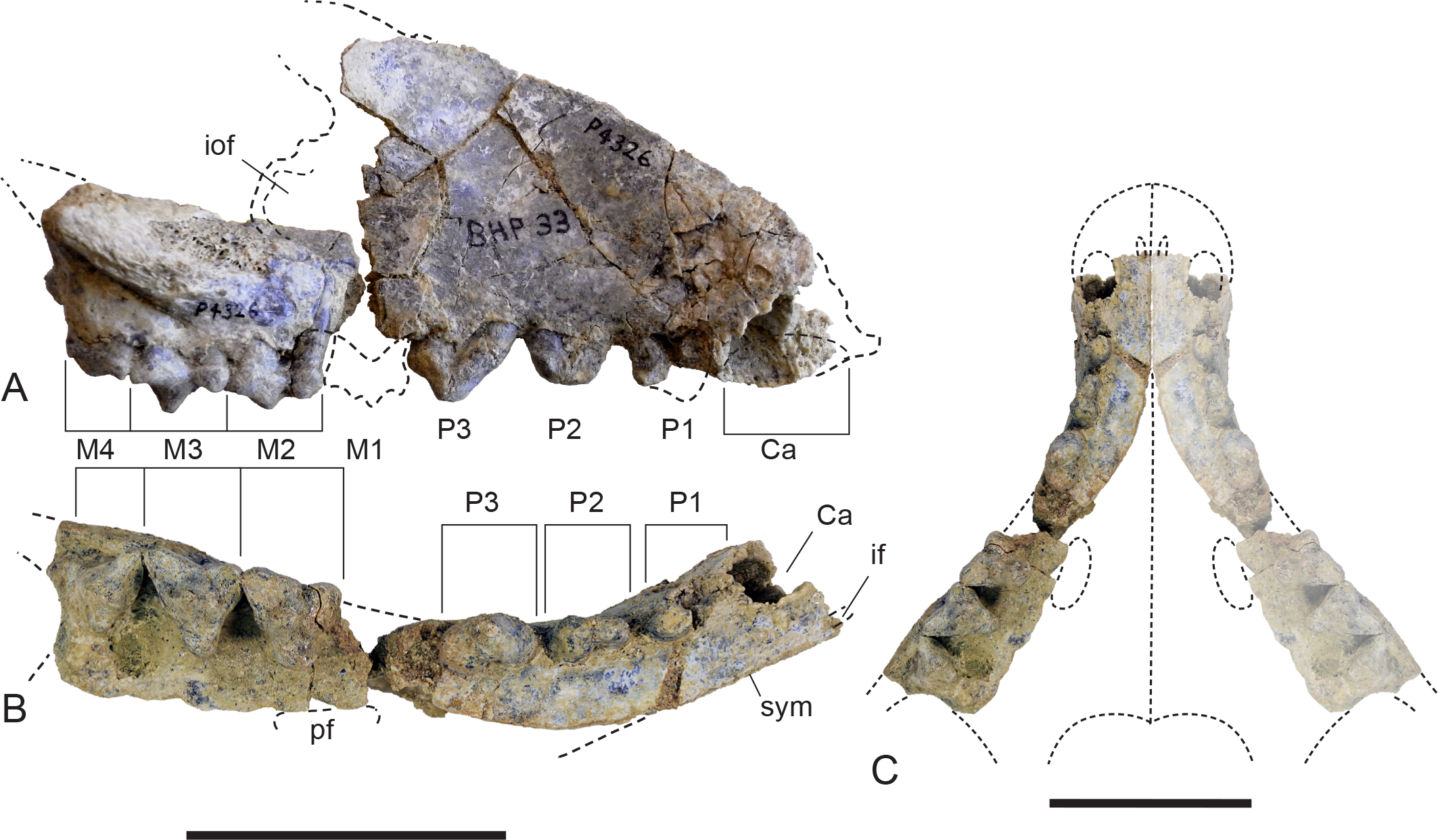
- Upper jaw

Scientific classification
- Kingdom: Animalia
- Phylum: Chordata
- Class: Mammalia
- Infraclass: Marsupialia
- Order: Dasyuromorphia
- Family: †Thylacinidae
- Genus: †Thylacinus
- Species: †T. potens

Binomial name
- †Thylacinus potens Woodburne, 1967

= Thylacinus potens =

Thylacinus potens Temporal range: Miocene 10–8 Ma

Extinct species of marsupial

Thylacinus potens ("powerful pouched animal") was the largest species of the family Thylacinidae, originally known from a single poorly preserved fossil discovered by Michael O. Woodburne in 1967 in a Late Miocene locality near Alice Springs, Northern Territory. It preceded the most recent species of thylacine by 4–6 million years, and was 5% bigger, was more robust and had a shorter, broader skull. Its size is estimated to be similar to that of a grey wolf; the head and body together were around 5 feet long, and its teeth were less adapted for shearing compared to those of the now-extinct thylacine.

== Taxonomy ==
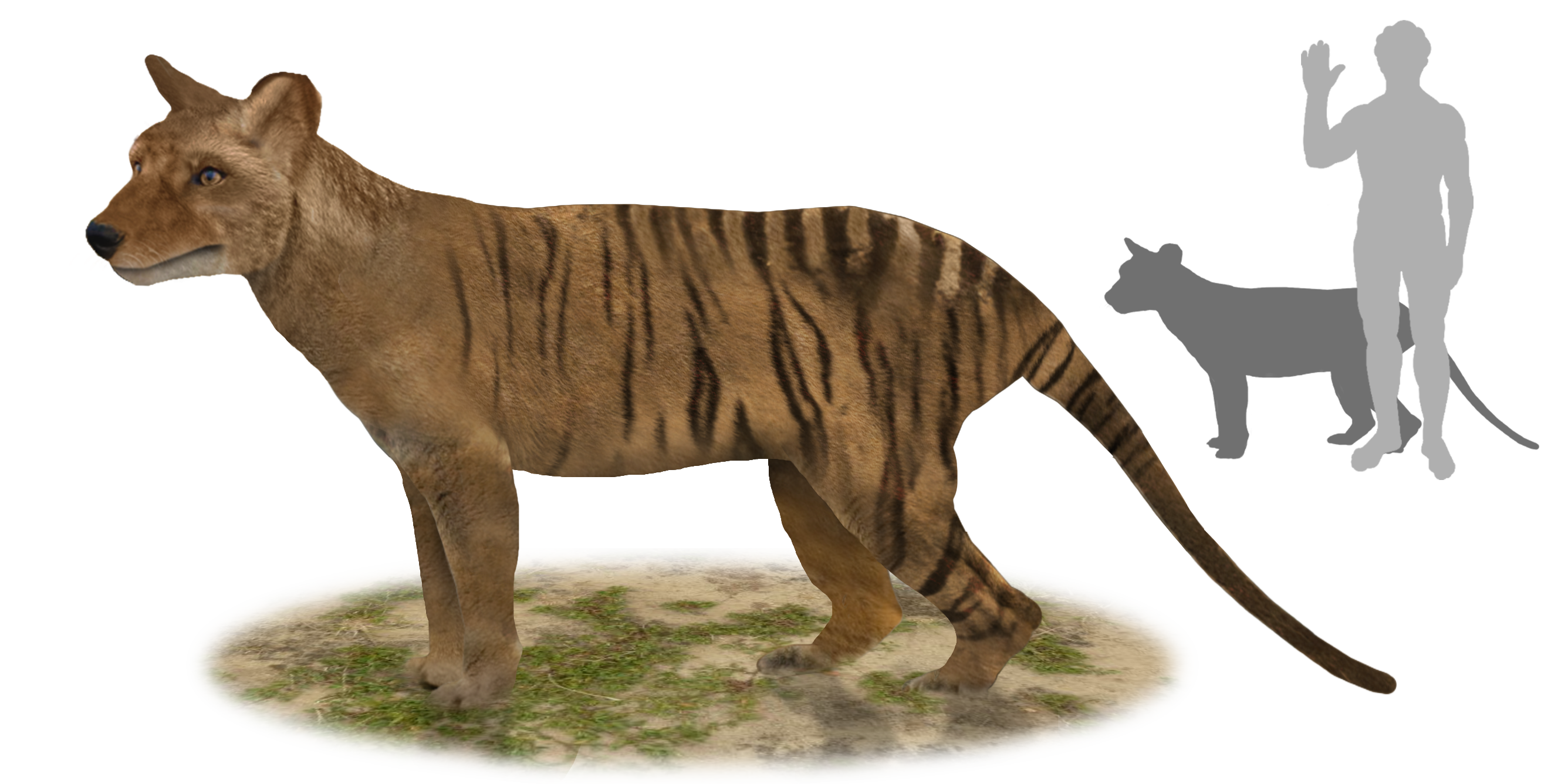
Restoration

The description of the species was published in 1967, the author Michael O. Woodburne distinguishing the new thylacine with the epithet potens for what he interpreted as a "powerful" predator. The evidence for the species emerged from geological and palaeontological research into the fossil fauna of the Alcoota site.

== Description ==
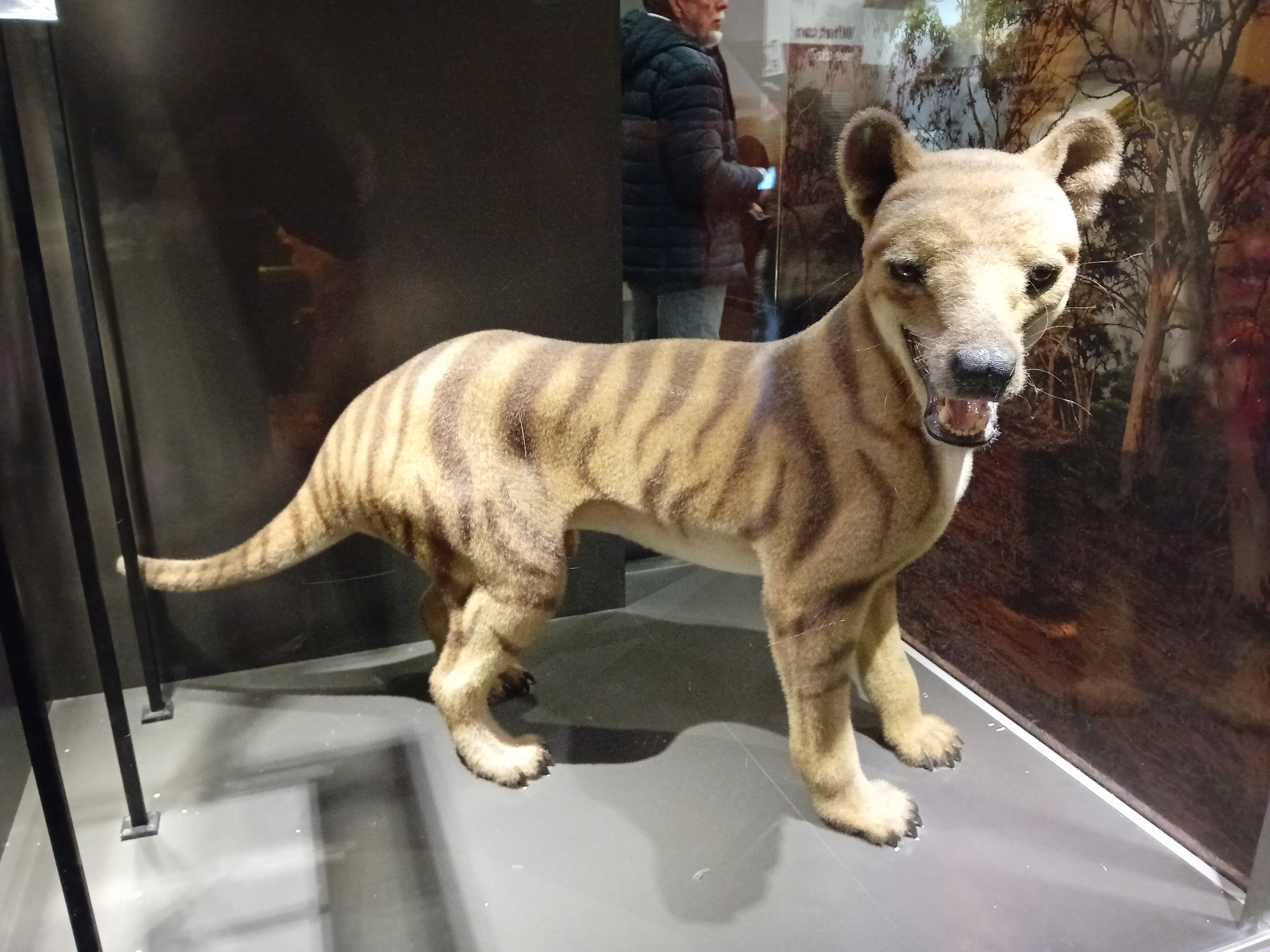
Reconstructed model at the Australian Museum

A larger species of Thylacinus, greater in size and weight than the thylacine (Thylacinus cynocephalus) and only exceeded by Thylacinus megiriani, the largest of the genus. The animal was similar to a dog in the form of its body and jaws, and probably able to kill prey such as wallabies and other herbivores larger than itself.

More specimens were described by Adam Yates in 2014, also discovered at the Alcoota site, revealing greater variety within the species and revising the weight estimates to greater than 35 kilograms. This material was found in a newly excavated site, named as "Shattered Dreams", that was opened by a backhoe to allow the extraction of specimens. The new T. potens specimens were a left dentary and maxilla which included the previously unknown anterior section of the dentition. The teeth of the new material exhibited a more gracile form than that previously assigned to T. potens, displaying a closer resemblance to T. cynocephalus.

An examination of tooth wear that suggests durophagy, probably bone-cracking behaviour, is interpreted as an evolutionary recent practice, to which the dentition was only partially suited, or a consequence of the ecological circumstances that created the mass assemblage of fossils at the same site. The modern thylacine was not recorded as cracking bones as part of its regular feeding habits, but known as a consumer of carrion, and the individual T. potens may have encountered a mass death during a period of drought in the sub-tropical Alcoota region. The revision of Thylacinus potens by Yates in 2014 concluded that the characteristics were closest to those of the thylacine, the most derived characters of the thylacinid phylogeny.
