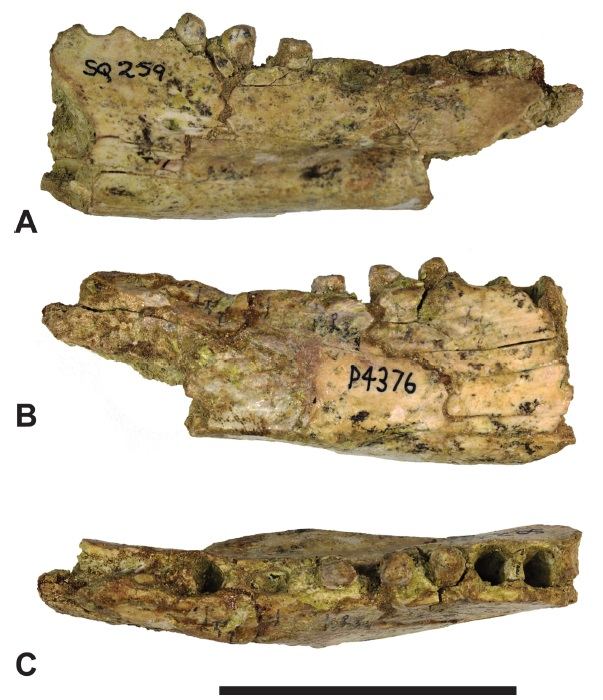
- Dentary

Scientific classification
- Domain: Eukaryota
- Kingdom: Animalia
- Phylum: Chordata
- Class: Mammalia
- Infraclass: Marsupialia
- Order: Dasyuromorphia
- Family: †Thylacinidae
- Genus: †Thylacinus
- Species: †T. megiriani

Binomial name
- †Thylacinus megiriani Murray, 1997

= Thylacinus megiriani =

Thylacinus megiriani Temporal range: 8 Ma

Extinct species of marsupial

Thylacinus megiriani lived during the late Miocene, around 8 million years ago. The area T. megiriani inhabited in the Northern Territory was covered in forest with a permanent supply of water. Thylacinus megiriani was a quadrupedal marsupial predator, that in appearance looked similar to a dog with a long snout. Its molar teeth were specialized for carnivory, the cups and crest were reduced or elongated to give the molars a cutting blade, and in proportion with its body, its teeth were exceptionally large, possibly adding to its body weight. Its estimated weight is over 57 kg. Thylacinus megiriani, along with crocodiles and giant monitor lizards, were thought to be the only predators in Alcoota.

Thylacinus megiriani fossils, along with those of T. potens, have been discovered in Alcoota in the Northern Territory, although the remains of Thylacinus in Alcoota are very rare. Paleontologist have found specimens densely packed together that died within a matter of years of one another. Drought and unpredictable weather likely were the cause.

== Taxonomy ==
The description of the species was published in a 1997 study by Peter F. Murray. The holotype was obtained at the Alcoota fossil area by the geologist Dirk Megirian, whose work in carefully excavating the specimen was honoured by the author in the specific epithet megiriani.

== Description ==
A species of Thylacinus, it was somewhat larger than the recent Tasmanian tiger Thylacinus cynocephalus, and similar weight to another late Miocene species Thylacinus potens, both of which are estimated to have been in a range of 38.7 and 57.3 kilograms. The type material was exceptionally fragmented in its sandstone deposition at Alcoota, requiring the assembly of the dentary for examination and comparison. The first reconstruction of the specimen was modified by the describing author. Murray's reconstruction is of one larger and more robust dentition and palate than T. cynocephalus, but resembling the gracile and elongated snout, more so than the species T. potens.
