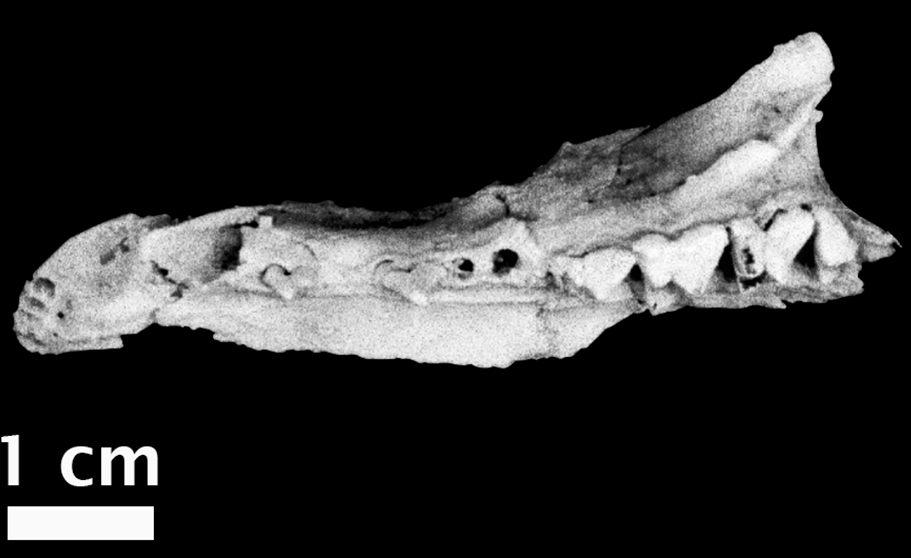
- Referred specimen of B. turnbulli

Scientific classification
- Kingdom: Animalia
- Phylum: Chordata
- Class: Mammalia
- Infraclass: Marsupialia
- Order: Dasyuromorphia
- Family: †Thylacinidae
- Genus: †Badjcinus; Muirhead & Wroe, 1998

Type species
- †Badjcinus turnbulli Muirhead & Wroe, 1998

Other species
- †B. timfaulkneri Churchill, Archer & Hand, 2024

= Badjcinus =

Badjcinus Temporal range: Late Oligocene, 28–23 Ma

Extinct genus of marsupials

Badjcinus is an extinct thylacinid marsupial. It is the earliest and most primitive known thylacinid, living 23 to 28 million years ago in the late Oligocene.

The generic name combines the Wanyi Aboriginal language "badj", 'expert hunter', and a word from Ancient Greek "kynos", meaning 'dog', from which the Thylacinidae name was originally derived. The specific epithet was proposed by the authors to honour the contributions of William D. Turnbull to palaeontology.

Badjcinus was quite small, averaging 5.2 pounds (2.4 kg) in weight. It was a carnivore, probably eating small vertebrates and insects, as living Dasyurus species do today. The fossils were found at Riversleigh in north-west Queensland, Australia. Since other animals at Riversleigh were rainforest species, it is possible that B. turnbulli was arboreal, like Dasyurus maculatus.
