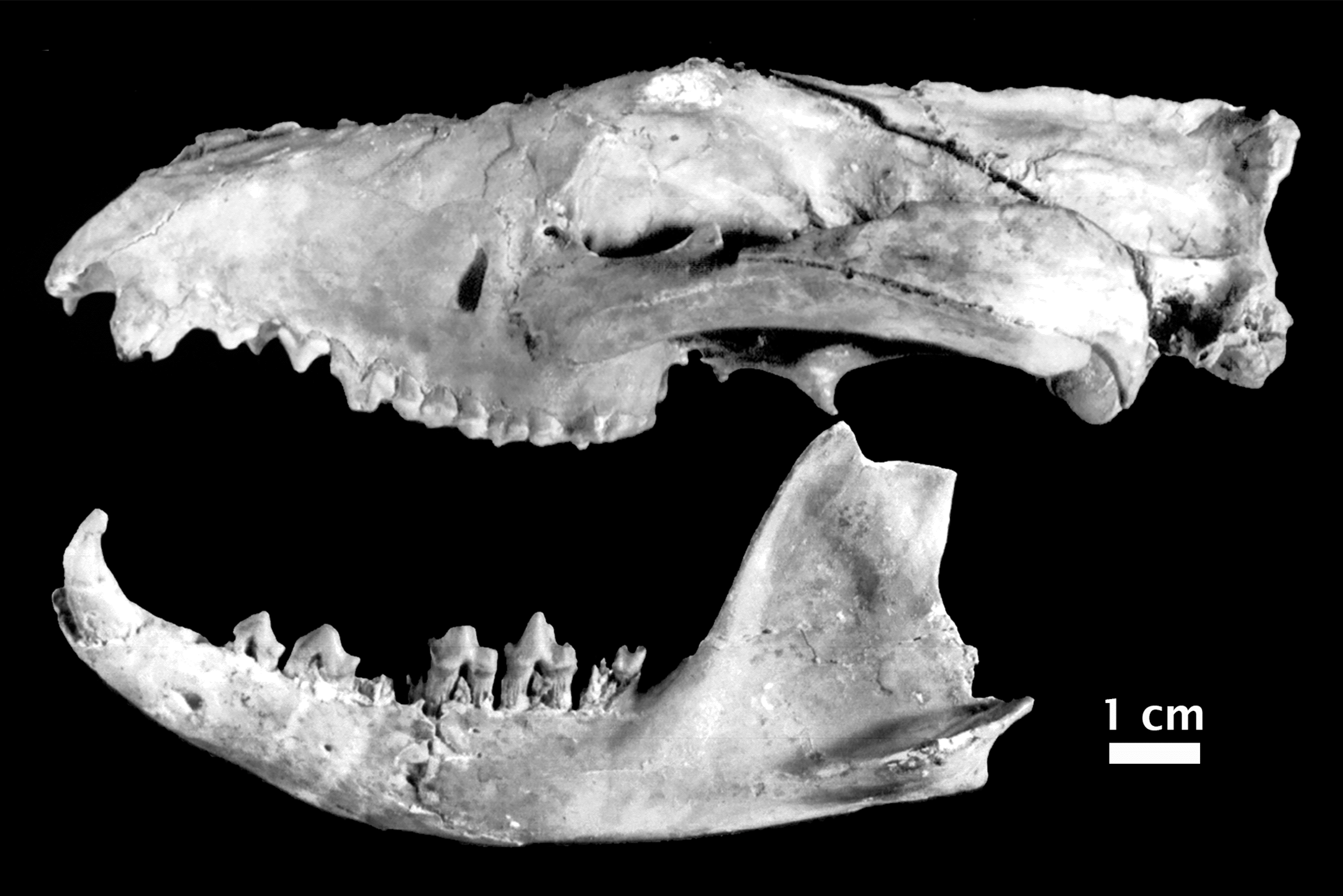
- Skull and mandible of N. dicksoni

Scientific classification
- Kingdom: Animalia
- Phylum: Chordata
- Class: Mammalia
- Infraclass: Marsupialia
- Order: Dasyuromorphia
- Family: †Thylacinidae
- Genus: †Nimbacinus; Muirhead & Archer, 1990

Type species
- Nimbacinus dicksoni Muirhead & Archer, 1990

Other species
- †N. peterbridgei Churchill, Archer & Hand, 2024

Synonyms
- Nimbacinus richi Murray & Megirian, 2000

= Nimbacinus =

Nimbacinus Temporal range: 26–12 Ma Late Oligocene to Middle Miocene

Genus of extinct Australian marsupial carnivores

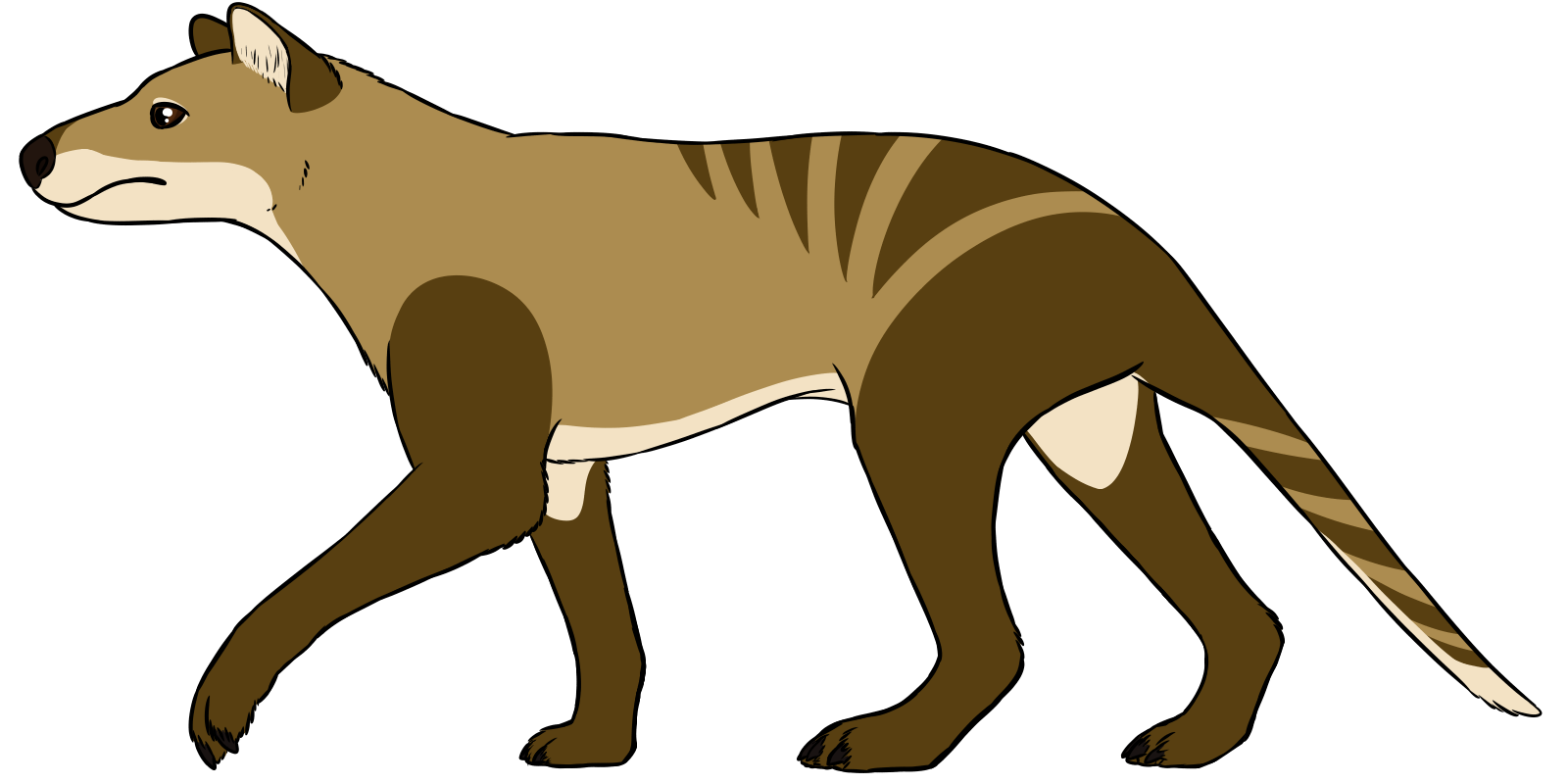
Life restoration

Nimbacinus is an extinct genus of thylacinid that contains two species of carnivorous, quadrupedal marsupials in Australia both of which are extinct:

- Nimbacinus dicksoni Muirhead & Archer, 1990
- Nimbacinus peterbridgei Churchill, Archer & Hand, 2024

Like all thylacinids, Nimbacinus dicksoni was a dog-like marsupial, though its smaller size makes its appearance more comparable to that of a fox. Unlike its relatives, its jaws were likely strong enough for it to take down prey larger than itself.

The name of the genus combines "Nimba" and "cinus", derived from a word meaning "little" in the Wanyi language, indigenous peoples associated with the Riversleigh fossil site, and the Ancient Greek word "kynos", meaning "dog".

== Taxonomy ==
The description of N. richi was published in 2000 by researchers Peter F. Murray, working at the Museum of Central Australia and Dirk Megirian of the Northern Territory Museum. The holotype is fossilised material excavated at "Top Site" at the Bullock Creek fossil area, a partial left dentary with a premolar and several molars that is dated to the mid-Miocene. The specific epithet commemorates Tom Rich, who introduced the authors to the site of their discovery.

== Palaeobiology ==
N. dicksoni had a bite force quotient of 189, making it one of the most powerfully biting mammals relative to its size of all time.
