= Riversleigh World Heritage Area =

Riversleigh
UNESCO World Heritage Site
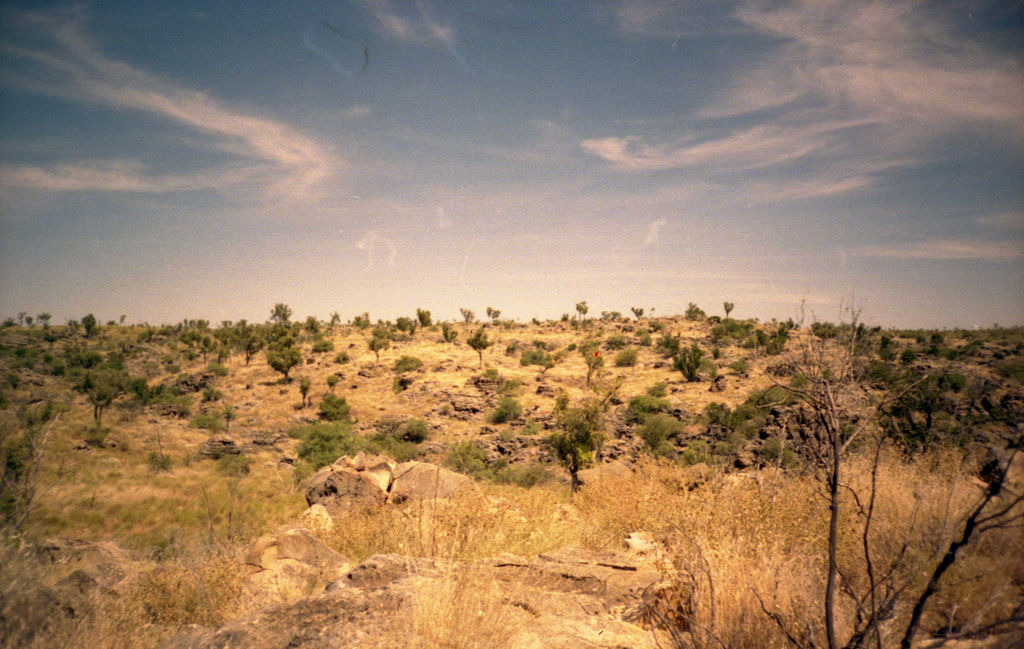

- Location within Queensland Location within Australia
- Location: Gregory, Queensland, Australia
- Part of: Australian Fossil Mammal Sites (Riversleigh / Naracoorte)
- Criteria: Natural: (viii), (ix)
- Reference: 698-001
- Inscription: 1994 (18th Session)
- Area: 100.29 km^{2} (38.72 sq mi)
- Coordinates: 19°2′S 138°38′E

Riversleigh World Heritage Area is Australia's most famous fossil location, recognised for the series of well preserved fossils deposited from the Late Oligocene to more recent geological periods. The fossiliferous limestone system is located near the Gregory River in the north-west of Queensland, an environment that was once a very wet rainforest that became more arid as the Gondwanan land masses separated and the Australian continent moved north. The approximately 100-square-kilometer (39-square-mile) area contains fossil remains of ancient mammals, birds, and reptiles of the Oligocene and Miocene ages, many of which were discovered and are only known from the Riversleigh area; the species that have occurred there are known as the Riversleigh fauna.

The fossils at Riversleigh are unusual because they are found in soft freshwater limestone which has not been compacted. This means the animal remains retain their three-dimensional structure, rather than being partially crushed like in most fossil sites. The area is located within the catchment of the Gregory River. Many of the fossil sites were crevices and limestone caves created by the action of large amounts of water on the karst formation, creating pitfall traps and feeding spots for predators which periodically and perhaps suddenly became covered and preserved; these conditions are responsible for the large assemblages of fossilised bats whose guano helped to conserve the remains of themselves and others.

Fossils were first noted to exist in the area in 1901. An initial exploration survey was conducted in 1963. Since 1976, the area has been the subject of systemic exploration. The site was co-listed with the Naracoorte Caves National Park in South Australia as a World Heritage Site in 1994, and by itself, it is an extension of the Boodjamulla National Park.

== Description ==
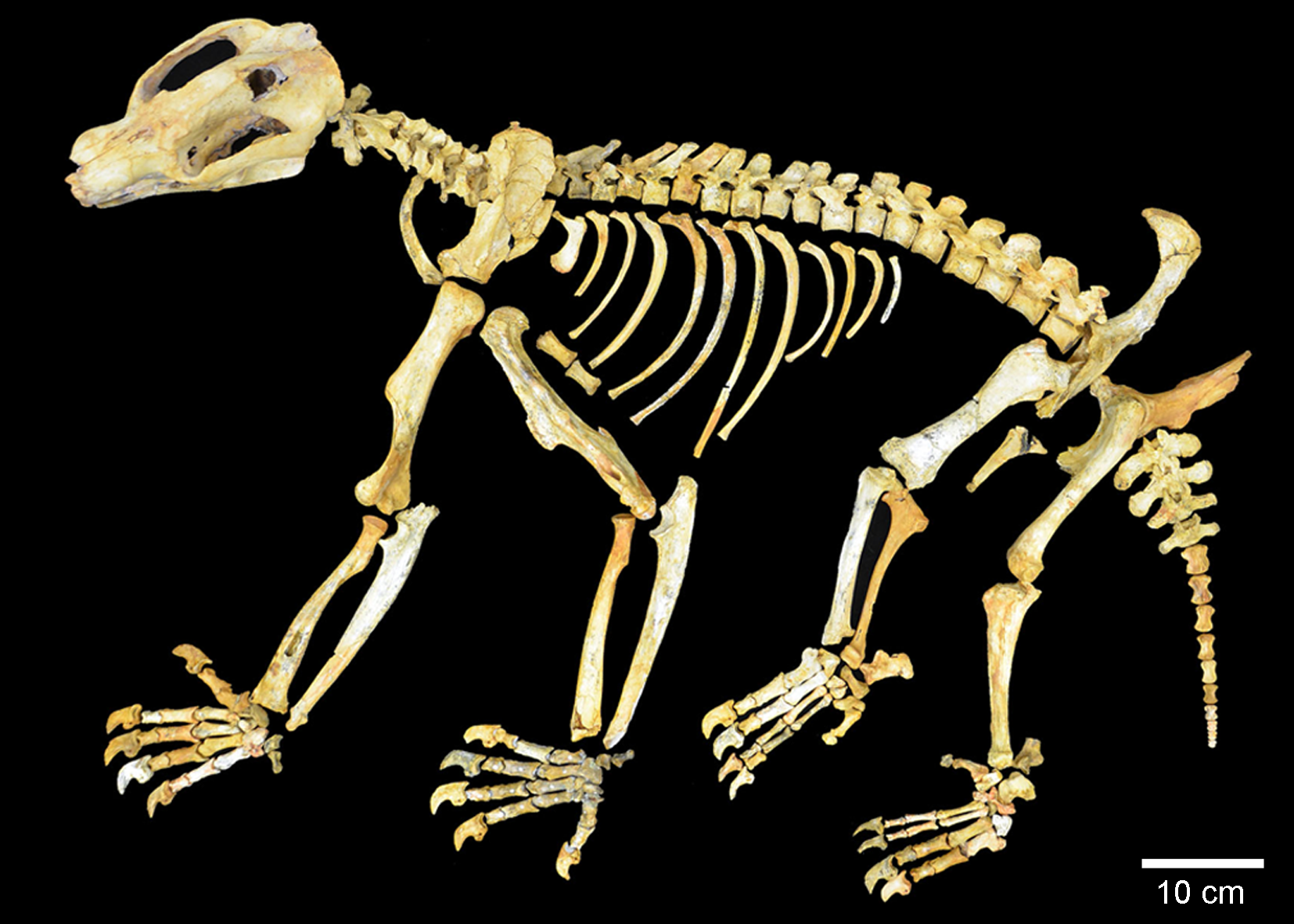
Nimbadon skeleton

Fossils at Riversleigh are found in limestone by lime-rich freshwater pools, and in caves, when the ecosystem was evolving from rich rainforest to semiarid grassland community. Some of the fossils at Riversleigh are 25 million years old. High concentrations of calcium carbonate have meant the fossils are extremely well preserved. The fossil collection reveals mammalian evolution across more than 20 million years. Fossils have been found in more than 200 individual locations, but only around half possess species that were described. The fossil record here is significant because it provides evidence on evolution and the distribution of species across Gondwana.

The presence of Riversleigh fauna in the Oligo-Miocene has been classified by four "faunal zones", and used to denote the presence of fossil taxa in these time periods. These may be summarised as

- Faunal Zone A (FZA): Late or Upper Oligocene, 28.4 to 23.03 million years ago
- Faunal Zone B (FZB): Early or Lower Miocene, 23.03 to 15.97 Ma
- Faunal Zone C (FZC): Middle Miocene, 15.97 to 11.608 Ma
- Faunal Zone D (FZD): Late or Upper Miocene, 11.608 to 5.332 Ma

A common claim is that thirty-five fossil bat species have been identified at the site. However, this is outdated and only about 25 are actually described. Regardless, cave deposits have been particularly rich in bat species. A survey of species-level taxa described in the Riversleigh Fauna in the decades of research preceding 2006, resulted in a total greater than 290 species. However, this number is likely also out-of-date.

The skull and nearly complete dentition of a 15-million-year-old monotreme, Obdurodon dicksoni, provide a window into the evolution of this characteristically Australian group. Fossil ancestors of the recently extinct thylacine, Thylacinus cynocephalus, have also been identified among Riversleigh's fauna. In 1993, skulls of the koala-like Nimbadon were unearthed in a previously unknown cave in the region. Researchers estimate that this marsupial first appeared about 15 million years ago and died out about 12 million years ago, perhaps from climate change-induced losses in habitat. A well-preserved skull of the ancient Nimbacinus dicksoni, an extinct relative of the thylacine, has been used to determine the hunting behavior of the species.

Other fossils have provided evidence of how the koala has evolved in response to Australia's change from predominant rainforest vegetation to drier eucalypt forests. The fossil bird fauna at Riversleigh includes an artamid Kurrartapu johnnguyeni, a fossil sittella, and representatives of various other families of modern birds. Some fossil insects and plants have also been discovered.

The fossil species identified at the sites are collectively known as the Riversleigh fauna.

== Research ==
Scientific studies are mostly conducted by a group of palaeontologists from the University of New South Wales. Mike Archer is a paleontologist who has been working at Riversleigh since 1983. He and his co-workers discovered that diluted acetic acid was the most effective method of extracting fossils. Karen Black, a palaeontologist from UNSW, discovered a new species of extinct koala, at Riversleigh, which was then named after Dick Smith.

== See also ==
- List of fossil sites
- Agate Fossil Beds National Monument
- Santa Rosa local fauna
- Messel pit
- Laguna del Hunco Formation
- Posidonia Shale
