= Rhinonicteris tedfordi =

Scientific classification
- Kingdom: Animalia
- Phylum: Chordata
- Class: Mammalia
- Order: Chiroptera
- Family: Rhinonycteridae
- Genus: Rhinonicteris
- Species: †R. tedfordi

Binomial name
- †Rhinonicteris tedfordi Hand 1997

Extinct bat species

Rhinonicteris tedfordi is an extinct species of microbat, of the order Chiroptera, known from fossil material found in Australia.

== Taxonomy ==
The description of the fossil specimens as an extinct species was published by Suzanne J. Hand in 1997. The nearest relative is regarded as the only living species of the family, Rhinonicteris aurantia, which occurs in two isolated populations across the north of Australia. The genus name is derived from ancient Greek, combining terms for nose, rhis, and bat, nycteris. The specific epithet tedfordi honours the work of Richard Tedford at Riversleigh, on behalf on thee American Museum of Natural History, in identifying tertiary mammals in the fossil beds.

The author Suzanne J. Hand compared material from a microsite with an earlier description of a hipposiderid species Brachipposideros nooraleebus and the extant Rhinonicteris aurantia, the revision of related material resulted in the publication of this species. The type material was obtained at the Bitesantennary Site in early Miocene deposits composed of fossilised bat skulls and bones and snails. The holotype and syntypes are incomplete skulls selected from the large amount of fragmentary material stratigraphically dated to the Miocene. The systematic treatment was as family Hipposideridae Miller 1907, placed with superfamily Rhinolophoidea Weber, 1928 of the suborder Microchiroptera.

== Description ==
A species of the family Rhinonycteridae Gray, 1866. The remains of the species have been found at several locations of the Australian Fossil Mammal Sites (Riversleigh).

== Ecology ==
The species Rhinonicteris tedfordi existed in the early Miocene period. The fossil records are the earliest example of an endemic lineage of Australian Rhinonicteris, which includes later material of the genus which is yet to be formally described; the fossil Rhinonicteris material at Riversleigh dates from the Miocene through to the present period.

The site was a cave, open to the nearby environment, and contains the remains of probably over ten other microchiropteran species and shells of freshwater snails. The preservation state of a large amount of the type material indicates the fossilisation process began shortly after their deposit. The presence of snails suggests the site was submerged at some period. The travertine floor of the site contains a large stalagmite.
