= Leioproctus idiotropoptera =

Scientific classification
- Kingdom: Animalia
- Phylum: Arthropoda
- Clade: Pancrustacea
- Class: Insecta
- Order: Hymenoptera
- Family: Colletidae
- Genus: Leioproctus
- Species: L. idiotropoptera

Binomial name
- Leioproctus idiotropoptera Packer 2006

Species of bee

Leioproctus idiotropoptera is a species of bee in the family Colletidae and subfamily Colletinae. It is endemic to Australia. It was described by Canadian entomologist Laurence Packer in 2006.

== Etymology ==
The specific epithet idiotropoptera (Greek: "bizarre" or "whimsical" + "wing") refers to the unusual form of the male forewing.

== Description ==
Male body length is 6.3 mm, forewing length 3.8 mm, head width 1.7 mm. Integumental colouration is mainly black, the metasoma and legs dark brown. The hair is white to pale brown.

== Distribution and habitat ==
The species occurs in the Top End of the Northern Territory. The type locality is Litchfield National Park.

== Behaviour ==
The adults are flying mellivores.
