= Brevipalatus =

Scientific classification
- Kingdom: Animalia
- Phylum: Chordata
- Class: Mammalia
- Order: Chiroptera
- Family: Rhinonycteridae
- Genus: †Brevipalatus
- Species: †B. mcculloughi

Binomial name
- †Brevipalatus mcculloughi Hand, 2005

Species of bat

Brevipalatus mcculloughi is a species of bat that existed in the early Miocene. It was discovered at a fossil deposit of the Riversleigh World Heritage Area.

== Taxonomy ==
The description of Brevipalatus mcculloughi was published in 2005 by senior researchers at the Riversleigh fossil sites Suzanne Hand and Mike Archer, separated from other bats of the hipposiderid family by a new genus. A holotype was selected from a large amount of fossilised material in a deposition at the Bitesantennary Site, part of a skull with some intact molars. All the specimens included in the first description were obtained at the type locality.

The name Brevipalatus is derived from Latin to describe the shortness of the palate. A specific epithet was selected by the authors to honour Ron McCullough, then mayor of Mount Isa in Queensland, Australia, who is credited with giving extensive support to the research and recognition of the Riversleigh World Heritage Area.

== Description ==
A chiropteran allied to the hipposiderid family, known as old world leaf-nosed bats, which use echolocation to hunt at night. The short length of palate distinguished the new taxon from others of the family. The dentition of Brevipalatus mcculloughi, along with other structures of the ear and rostrum found in modern species of leaf-nosed bats, indicate they also consumed nocturnal insects like moths that were caught in flight. The weight range is estimated to be around 8 grams, and forearm length of 45–50 millimetres.

A modern hipposiderid species that occurs in northern Australia, Rhinonicteris aurantia (orange leaf-nosed bat), is thought to be closely related to this earlier species.

== Distribution ==
Brevipalatus mcculloughi was discovered in a fossil deposit known as the Bitesantennary site, a diverse assemblage of bat species and other Riversleigh fauna of the time. This site was a cave within a limestone formation that was occupied by B. mcculloughi during the early Miocene, classified in Riversleigh research as Faunal Zone B. The species foraged in an area that was dominated by rainforest and probably cohabited with other species of bats at its daytime roosts.
