= Buley Rockhole =

Rockhole in the Northern Territory, Australia

Coordinates: 13°06′49″S 130°47′11″E

Buley Rockhole is a rock-hole located in Litchfield National Park in the Northern Territory.

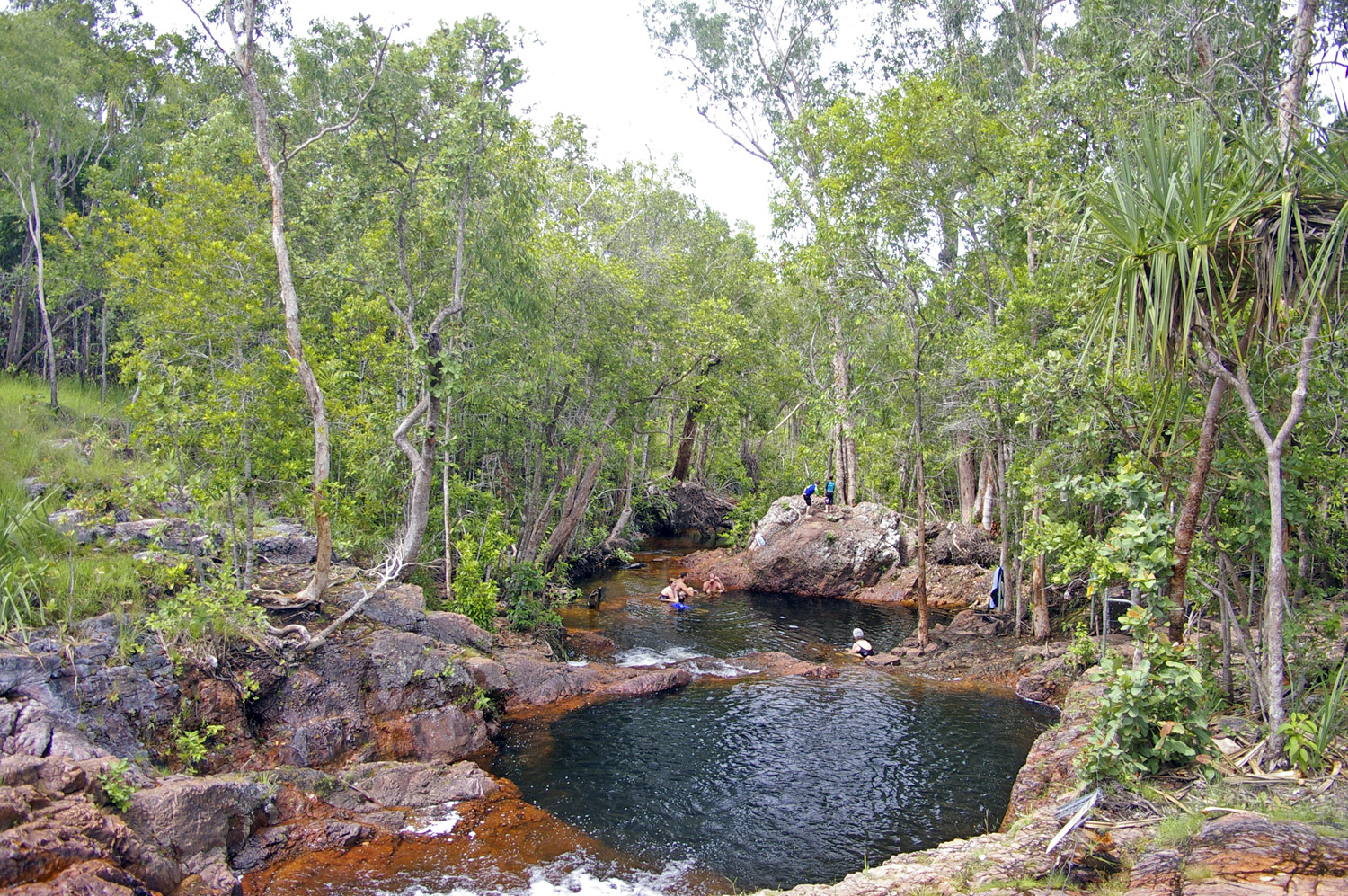
Buley Rockhole

== Naming ==
The rockhole is named after Norman Buley, who was in charge of a government prospecting party sent to "examine areas drained by the Katherine, Fitzmaurice and Daly Rivers in 1920".

== Location ==
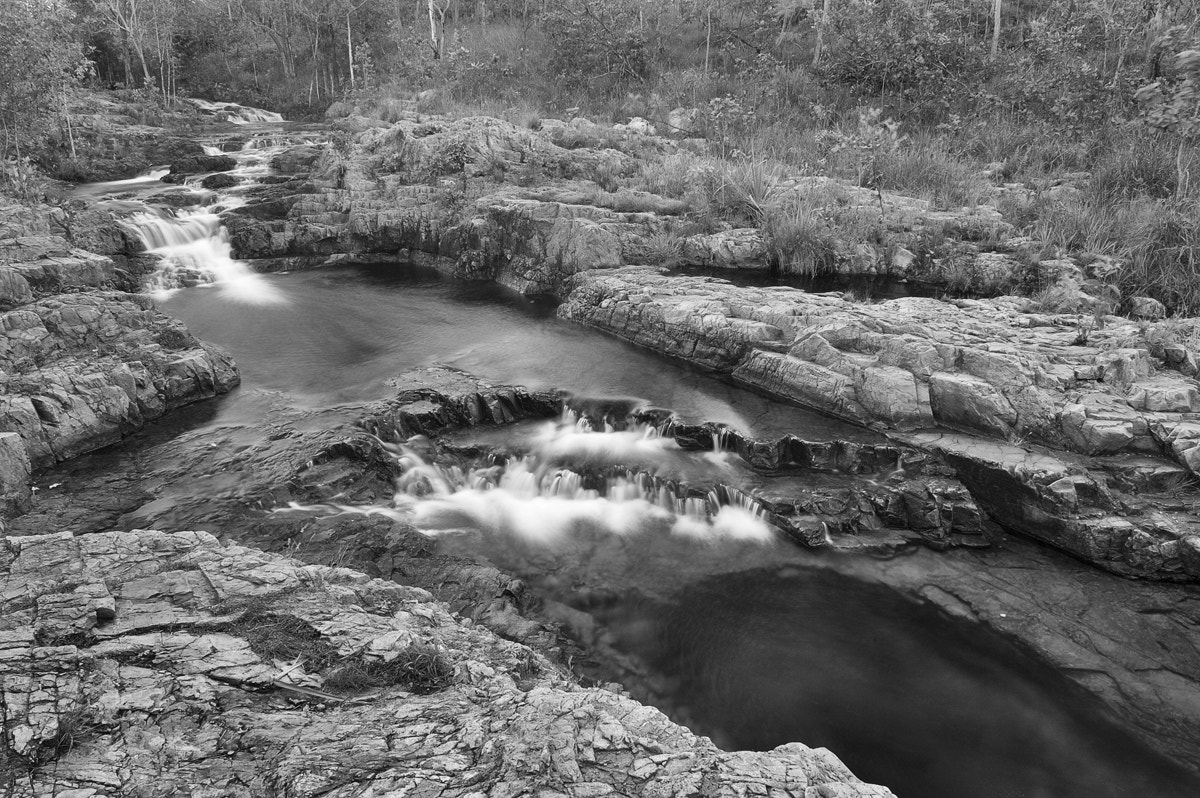
Buley Rockhole

It is down a short street off the road going towards Florence Falls. It is only a couple of kilometres from Litchfield and about an hour from Darwin.

== Entertainment ==
Buley rockhole is a relaxing set of rock holes with a nice swimming area. It can get quite busy if you don't get there early.

== Camping ==
Buley Rockholes has a vehicle-based campground with these facilities that can have camper trailers, it has cold showers, a ranger, toilets, a wood fireplace, No dogs or pets, Walking Trails, Swimming, A crocodile warning and has a Camping Fee. The campground is accessible by a 2WD, but there are no coaches and no caravans. There are no powered sites.
