= Brachipposideros =

Brachipposideros Temporal range: Burdigalian 20.4–15.9 Ma

Scientific classification
- Kingdom: Animalia
- Phylum: Chordata
- Class: Mammalia
- Order: Chiroptera
- Family: Rhinonycteridae
- Genus: †Brachipposideros; Sigé, 1968

Extinct genus of bats

Brachipposideros is an extinct genus of leaf-nosed bats known from Riversleigh, north-western Queensland, Australia and the Languedoc-Roussillon Region, France. The fossils date to the late Oligocene to early Miocene.

The species Brachipposideros nooraleebus was the first bat fossil to discovered and named in Australia, it is also the first of genus to be discovered outside of France. The fossil was found to resemble the orange leaf-nosed bat Rhinonicteris aurantia, an extant species that occurs in caves of Northern Queensland, than the type species of genus Hipposideros.

The dentition is the same as many other bats, and accords with the dental formula of hipposiderids: I1/2 C1/1 P1-2/2-3 M3/3

The species assigned to this genus include:

- Brachipposideros aguilari
- Brachipposideros collongensis
- Brachipposideros dechaseauxi
- Brachipposideros nooraleebus
