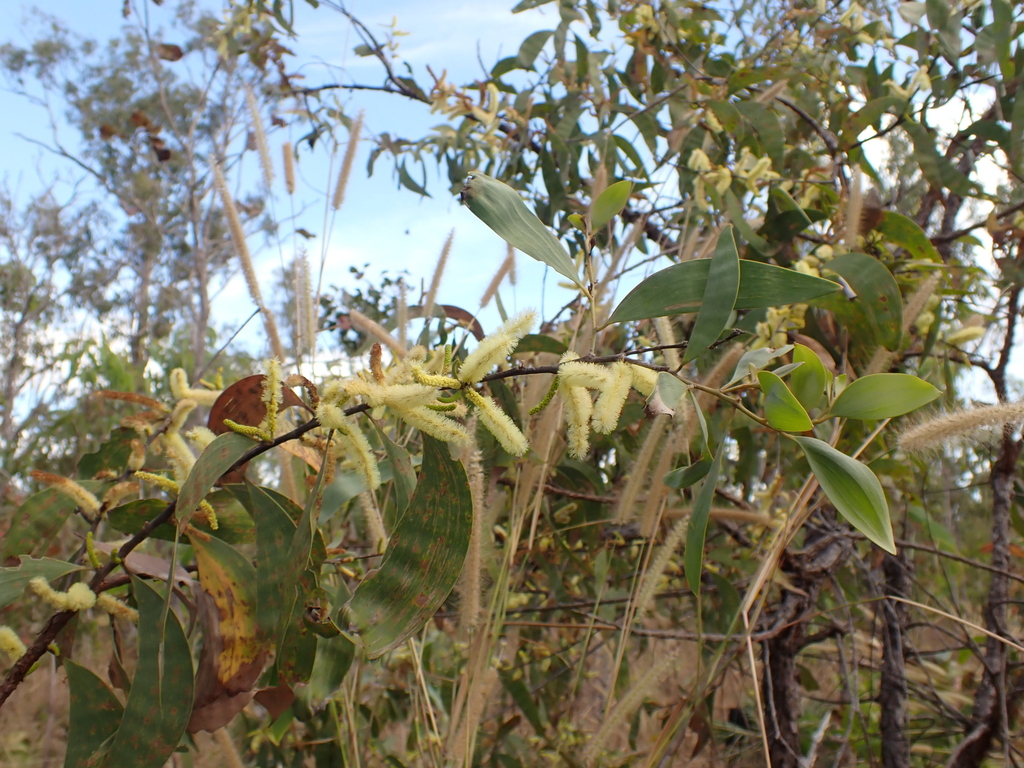
- In Litchfield National Park

Scientific classification
- Kingdom: Plantae
- Clade: Embryophytes
- Clade: Tracheophytes
- Clade: Spermatophytes
- Clade: Angiosperms
- Clade: Eudicots
- Clade: Rosids
- Order: Fabales
- Family: Fabaceae
- Subfamily: Caesalpinioideae
- Clade: Mimosoid clade
- Genus: Acacia
- Species: A. lamprocarpa

Binomial name
- Acacia lamprocarpa O.Schwarz
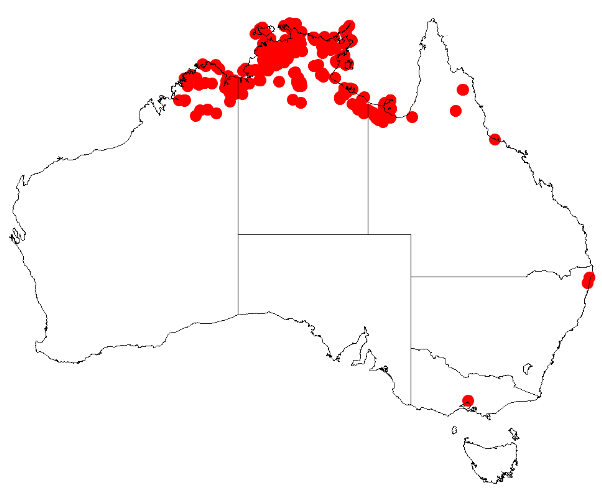
- Occurrence data from AVH

Synonyms
- Racosperma lamprocarpum (O.Schwartz) Pedley

= Acacia lamprocarpa =

Western salwood

Species of legume

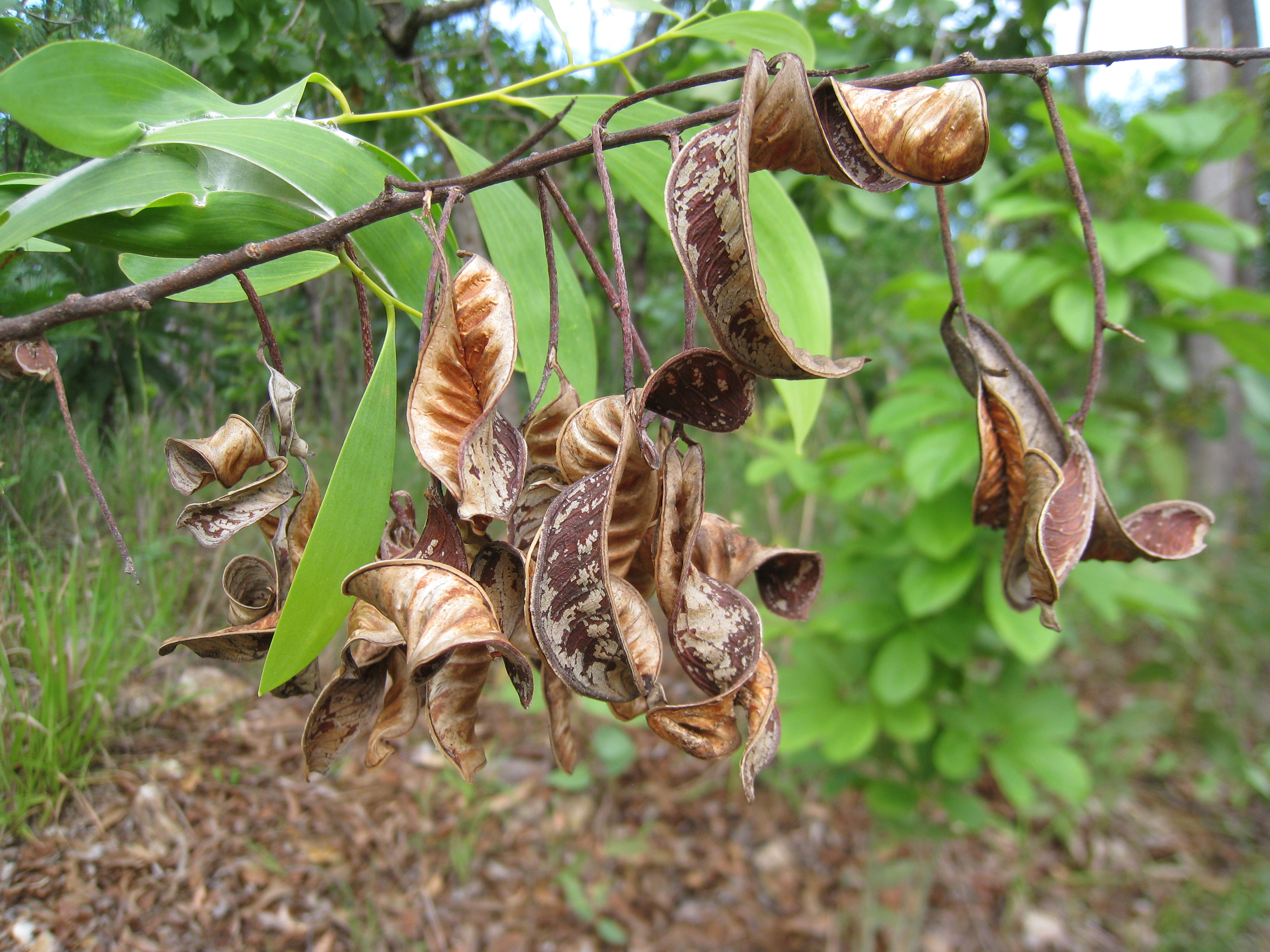
Seed pods

Acacia lamprocarpa, commonly known as western salwood, is a species of flowering plant in the family Fabaceae and is endemic to northern Australia. It is a tree with thick, papery, flaky bark, yellow-brown stems, slender, often pendulous branchlets, phyllodes with one edge convex and the other more or less straight, spikes of cream-coloured to pale yellow flowers and oblong to narrowly oblong, flat or twisted, woody, resinous, glabrous pods.

== Description ==
Acacia lamprocarpa is a tree that typically grows to a height of 4–15 m (13–49 ft) and has thick, papery bark, yellow-brown stems, and slender, often pendulous branchlets. Its phyllodes have one convex edge and one more or less straight edge, sometimes sickle-shaped, 55–185 mm (2.2–7.3 in) long and 9–35 mm (0.35–1.38 in) wide on a pulvinus 3–4 mm (0.12–0.16 in) long. The phyllodes are dull green, with six to eight parallel, longitudinal veins slightly more pronounced than the rest. The flowers are cream-coloured to pale yellow and borne in up to four spikes 10–40 mm (0.39–1.57 in) long on peduncles 2–5 mm (0.079–0.197 in) long. Flowering occurs from April to June, and the pods are oblong to narrowly oblong, 20–100 mm (0.79–3.94 in) long, 14–22 mm (0.55–0.87 in) wide, woody, resinous and glabrous, flat or spirally twisted.

== Taxonomy ==
Acacia lamprocarpa was first formally described in 1927 by Otto Schwarz in Repertorium specierum novarum regni vegetabilis from specimens collected by Florenz Bleeser (1871–1942) in Port Darwin. The specific epithet (lamprocarpa) means 'bright, lustrous or shining fruit', referring to its resinous pods that shine as if polished.

== Distribution and habitat ==
Western salwood is found across northern Australia in Western Australia, the Northern Territory and the Gulf Country of north east Queensland where it grows in a range of habitats, including the margins of watercourses, coastal sand dunes, sandy plain and on sandstone plateau. In Western Australia is native to a small area in the Kimberley region where it grows in sandy soils over sandstone or laterite.

== See also ==
- List of Acacia species
