= Hibbertia haplostemona =

Scientific classification
- Kingdom: Plantae
- Clade: Tracheophytes
- Clade: Angiosperms
- Clade: Eudicots
- Order: Dilleniales
- Family: Dilleniaceae
- Genus: Hibbertia
- Species: H. haplostemona

Binomial name
- Hibbertia haplostemona J.W.Horn

Species of plant

Hibbertia haplostemona is a species of flowering plant in the family Dilleniaceae, and is endemic to the Northern Territory. It is a small, short-lived sub-shrub with wiry, prostrate or low-lying stems, elliptic to egg-shaped leaves that are soon lost, and small red flowers with five stamens.

== Description ==
Hibbertia haplostemona is a short-lived sub-shrub that typically grows to a height of 30 cm (12 in) with wiry, prostrate to low-lying stems. The leaves are elliptic to egg-shaped, 20–50 mm (0.79–1.97 in) long, 8–23 mm (0.31–0.91 in) wide and serrated, on a petiole up to 25 mm (0.98 in) long, but are not persistent. The flowers are arranged singly on the ends of the main branches or on a peduncle 4–20 mm (0.16–0.79 in) long. The five sepals are oblong to elliptic and about the same size and shape as each other. The five petals are red, oblong to spatula-shaped, and about 3 mm (0.12 in) long. There are five stamens arranged around the carpels.

== Taxonomy ==
This species was first formally described in 1992 by Lyndley Craven and Clyde Robert Dunlop and given the name Pachynema diffusum in Australian Systematic Botany. After genetic studies of plastid DNA, James W. Horn changed the name to Hibbertia haplostemona. The name was chosen because Hibbertia diffusa had already been used for a different species.

== Distribution and habitat ==
This hibbertia grows on sandstone, often with Triodia species in the northern part of the Northern Territory.

== Conservation status ==
Hibbertia haplostemona is classified as of "least concern" under the Territory Parks and Wildlife Conservation Act 1976 and is conserved in Kakadu, Litchfield and Nitmiluk National Parks.

== See also ==
- List of Hibbertia species
