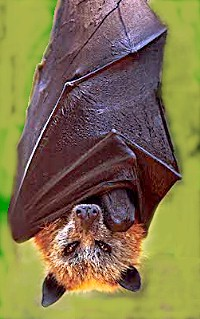

Scientific classification
- Kingdom: Animalia
- Phylum: Chordata
- Class: Mammalia
- Order: Chiroptera
- Suborder: Yinpterochiroptera; Springer, Teeling, Madsen, Stanhope and Jong, 2001

Families
- Craseonycteridae; Hipposideridae; Pteropodidae; Rhinopomatidae; Rhinolophidae; Megadermatidae; Rhinonycteridae

= Yinpterochiroptera =

Suborder of bats

The Yinpterochiroptera (or Pteropodiformes) is a suborder of the Chiroptera, which includes taxa formerly known as megabats and five of the microbat families: Rhinopomatidae, Rhinolophidae, Hipposideridae, Craseonycteridae, and Megadermatidae. This suborder is primarily based on molecular genetics data. This proposal challenged the traditional view that megabats and microbats form monophyletic groups of bats. Recent whole-genome phylogenetic research unambiguously confirmed the monophyly of the group.

The term Yinpterochiroptera is constructed from the words Pteropodidae (the family of megabats) and Yinochiroptera (a term proposed in 1984 by Karl F. Koopman to refer to certain families of microbats). Recent studies using transcriptome data have found strong support for the Yinpterochiroptera–Yangochiroptera classification system. Researchers have created a relaxed molecular clock that estimates the divergence between Yinpterochiroptera and Yangochiroptera around 63 million years ago. The most recent common ancestor of Yinpterochiroptera, corresponding to the split between Rhinolophoidea and Pteropodidae (Old World Fruit bats), is estimated to have occurred 60 million years ago.

The first appearance of the term Yinpterochiroptera was in 2001, in an article by Mark Springer and colleagues. As an alternative to the subordinal names Yinpterochiroptera and Yangochiroptera, some researchers use the terms Pteropodiformes and Vespertilioniformes, basing the names on the oldest valid genus description in each group, Pteropus and Vespertilio. Under this new proposed nomenclature, Pteropodiformes is the suborder that would replace Yinpterochiroptera.

== Classification ==
Suborder Yinpterochiroptera (Pteropodiformes)

- Family Craseonycteridae (Kitti's hog-nosed bat)
- Family Hipposideridae (Old World leaf-nosed bats)
- Family Megadermatidae (false vampires)
- Family Pteropodidae (megabats)
- Family Rhinolophidae (horseshoe bats)
- Family Rhinopomatidae (mouse-tailed bats)
- Family Rhinonycteridae
