= Tjaynera Falls =

Waterfall in the Northern Territory, Australia

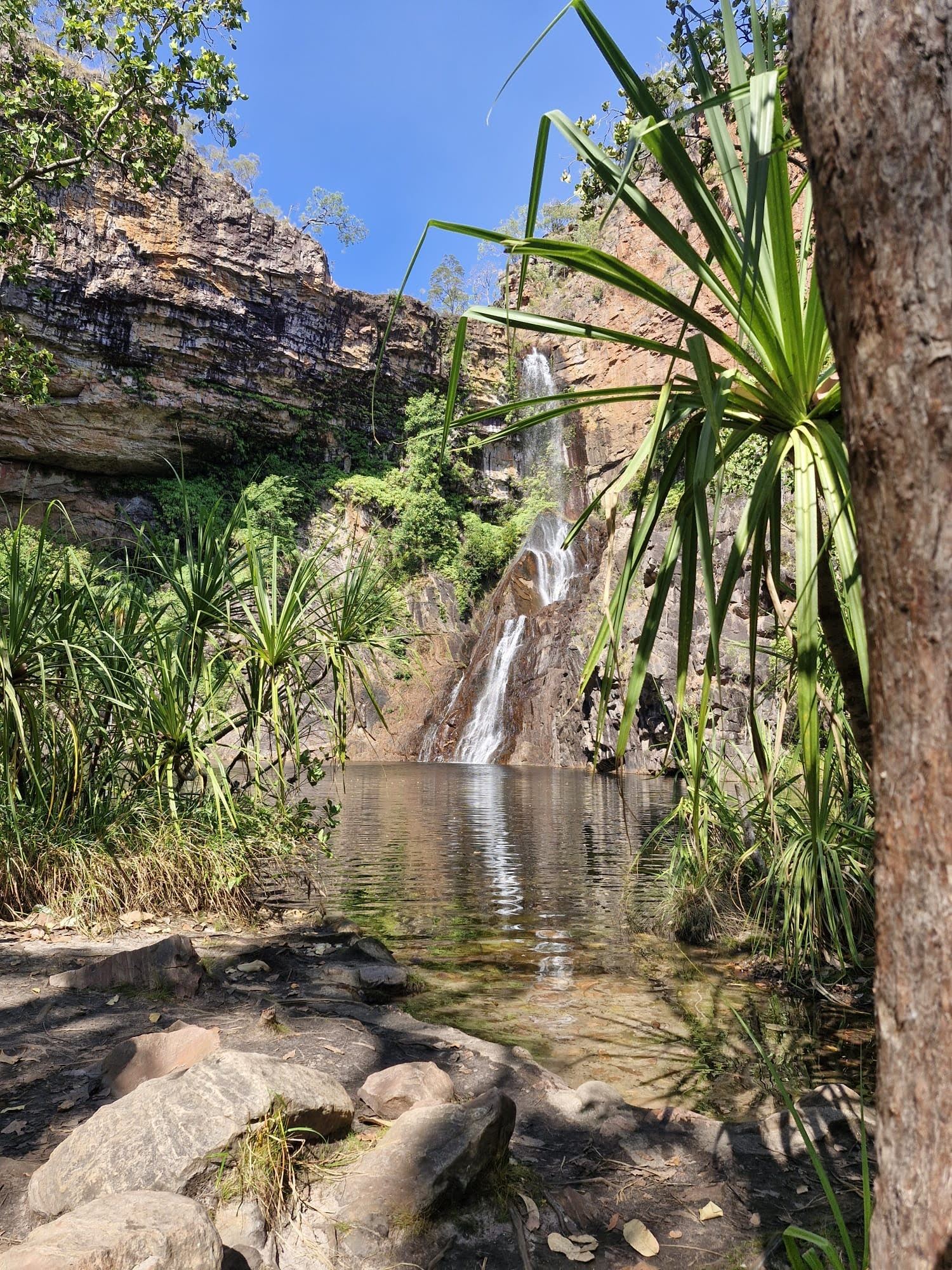
- Tjaynera Falls in August 2025

- Location within Northern Territory
- Location: Litchfield National Park, Northern Territory, Australia
- Coordinates: 13°14′40″S 130°45′28″E
- Elevation: 103 metres (338 ft) AHD
- Total height: 35–48 metres (115–157 ft)
- Number of drops: 1
- Watercourse: Sandy Creek

Tjaynera Falls is a waterfall on the Sandy Creek within Litchfield National Park in the Northern Territory of Australia.

== Location and features ==
The waterfall descends from an elevation of 103 metres (338 ft) above sea level in one drop that ranges in height between 35–48 metres (115–157 ft). Accessible by four-wheel drive trail, the falls are in the western portion of the park, 90 kilometres (56 mi) south of Darwin.

== See also ==
- List of waterfalls
- List of waterfalls in Australia
