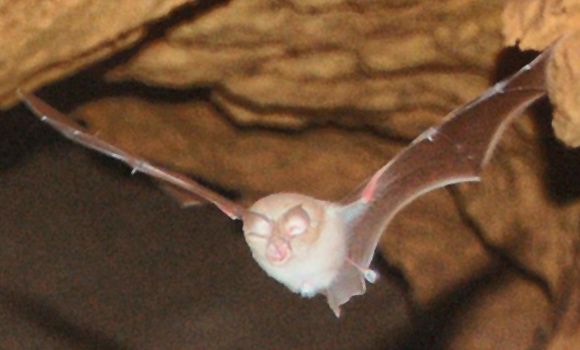
- Rhinolophus euryale

Scientific classification
- Kingdom: Animalia
- Phylum: Chordata
- Class: Mammalia
- Order: Chiroptera
- Suborder: Yinpterochiroptera
- Superfamily: Rhinolophoidea; Gray, 1825

Families
- Craseonycteridae; Hipposideridae; Megadermatidae; Rhinolophidae; Rhinonycteridae; Rhinopomatidae

= Rhinolophoidea =

Superfamily of bats

Rhinolophoidea is a superfamily of bats. It contains the following families: Craseonycteridae, Hipposideridae, Megadermatidae, Rhinolophidae, Rhinonycteridae, and Rhinopomatidae. It is one of two superfamilies that make up the suborder Yinpterochiroptera, the other being Pteropodoidea, which only contains the family Pteropodidae.

== Phylogeny ==
The relationships within Rhinolophoidea are as follows based on a 2016 study.

- Chiroptera
  - - Yangochiroptera
    - - Yinpterochiroptera
        - Pteropodidae (megabats)
        - - Rhinolophoidea
            - - Rhinopomatidae
              - - Megadermatidae
                - Craseonycteridae
            - - Rhinonycteridae
              - - Hipposideridae
                - Rhinolophidae
