= Percival's trident bat =

Conservation status
- Least Concern (IUCN 3.1)

Scientific classification
- Kingdom: Animalia
- Phylum: Chordata
- Class: Mammalia
- Order: Chiroptera
- Family: Rhinonycteridae
- Genus: Cloeotis; Thomas, 1901
- Species: C. percivali

Binomial name
- Cloeotis percivali Thomas, 1901
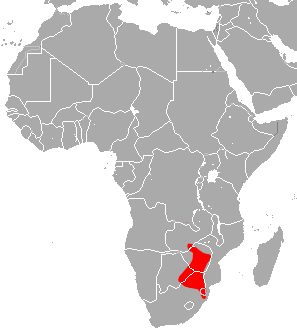
- Percival's trident bat core range

Species of bat

Percival's trident bat (Cloeotis percivali) is a species of bat in the family Hipposideridae. It is monotypic within the genus Cloeotis. It is found in Sub-Saharan Africa, with its core distribution in Southern Africa. It has been reported from Botswana, Democratic Republic of the Congo, Eswatini, Kenya, Mozambique, South Africa, Tanzania, Zambia, and Zimbabwe. Its natural habitats are savannas where there are suitable caves and mine tunnels that it can use for roosting. Colonies are never large (no more than about 300 individuals). Local numbers fluctuate greatly. Colonies can disappear, perhaps because they move to another place or go extinct.
