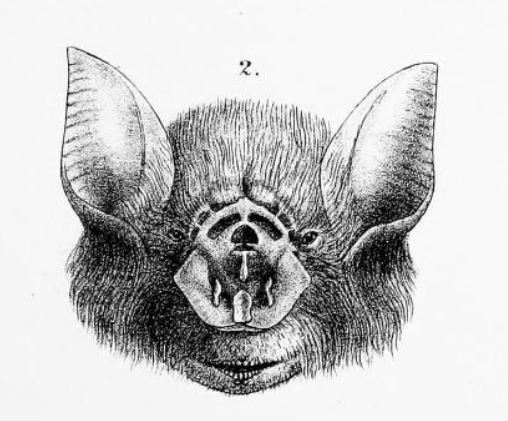
- Rhinonicteris aurantia

Scientific classification
- Kingdom: Animalia
- Phylum: Chordata
- Class: Mammalia
- Order: Chiroptera
- Superfamily: Rhinolophoidea
- Family: Rhinonycteridae; J.E. Gray, 1866

Type species
- Rhinolophus aurantius Gray, 1845
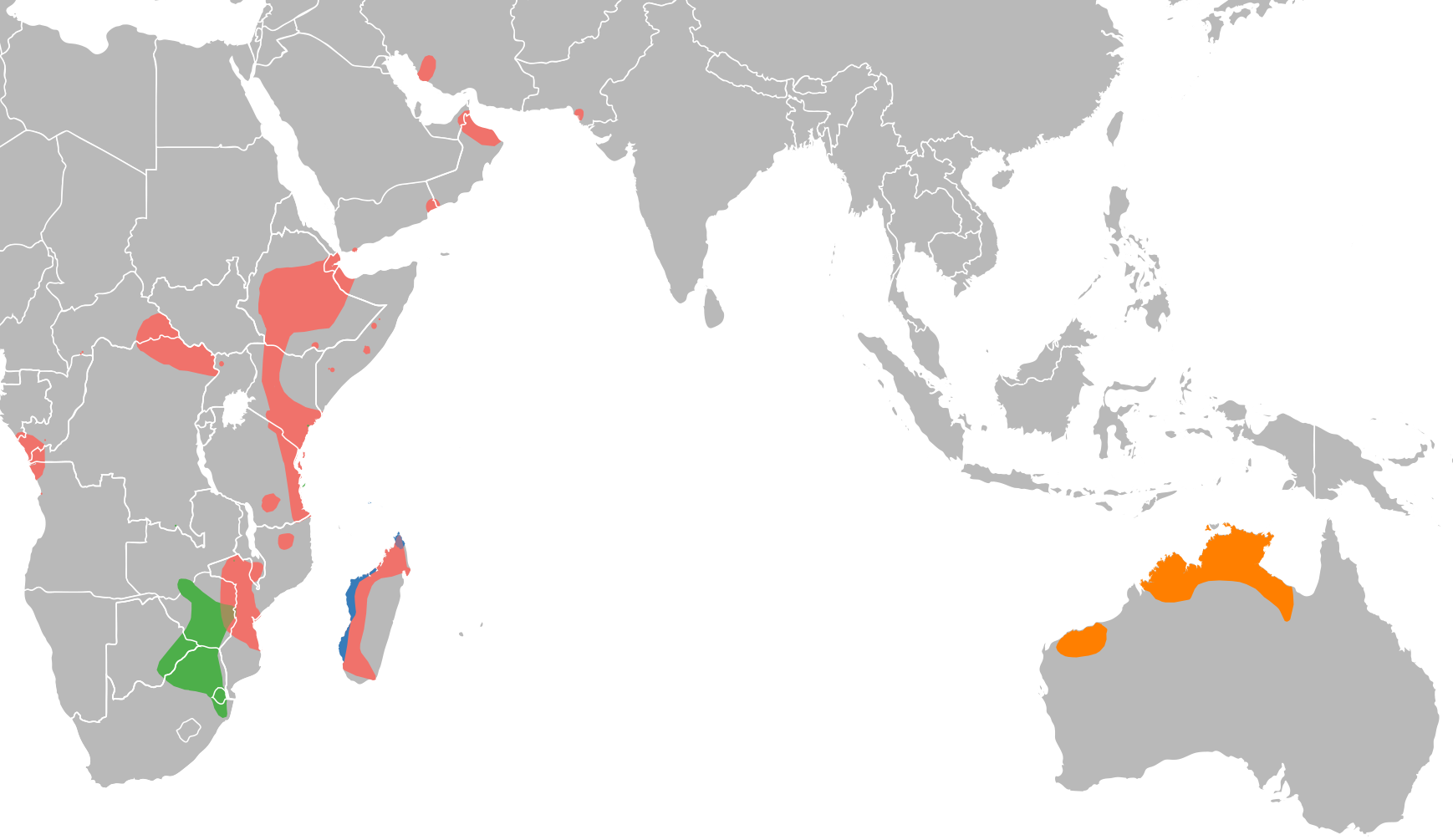
- Rhinonycteridae distribution Cloeotis in green, Triaenops in red, Paratriaenops in blue, Rhinonicteris in orange

= Rhinonycteridae =

Family of bats

Rhinonycteridae is a family of bats, within the suborder Yinpterochiroptera. The type species, the orange nose-leafed species group Rhinonicteris aurantia, is found across the north of Australia.

== Description ==
The family accords with the description to the type genus Rhinonicteris, and its classification of the morphology of the rhinarium. The revision of Hill in 1982 follows Gray to describe the features of the nose-leaf for the subfamilial group, and these provide diagnosis to distinguish the species from other families. Molecular analysis also provides a distinctive retrotransposon insertion expressed in a gene fragment.

== Taxonomy ==
The alliance resurrects John Edward Gray's 1866 arrangement of known microbat taxa, first published as subtribe Rhinonycterina, and elevating this to the rank of family. The taxon combined the poorly known genera Cloeotis and Triaenops in a 1982 revision that compared the nose-leaf morphology of the species. (Note: Hill J. A review of the leaf-nosed bats Rhinonycteris, Cloeotis and Triaenops (Chiroptera: Hipposideridae), Bonn Zool Beitr., 1982, vol. 33 (pg. 165-186)) This name was again proposed to accommodate the fossil and extant species of the genus Rhinonicteris, separating it from the unstable arrangements of family Hipposideridae, and was elevated in 2014. The affinities within the families Hipposideridae and Rhinolophidae are sometimes found to be contrary in morphological and molecular analyses, yet resolving the phylogeny of these speciose and poorly defined groups has implication in several areas of research. The synonymy includes earlier combinations that elevated the rank through subtribe, tribe then subfamily. The taxon Triaenopini Benda & Vallo, 2009 was also reduced to a synonym for this family by the authors of the 2014 revision that elevated this taxon.

The hipposiderid and rhinolophid bats are of especial interest to research into potential public health concerns, and the opportunity for a SARS-like outbreak from species that act as reservoirs for the coronaviruses implicated in conditions like the Chinese epidemic and Middle East respiratory syndrome outbreak. The reviewing authors also emphasise the strong support for elevation to family rank of Rhinonycteridae and reconsideration as a taxonomic equivalent to family Hipposideridae, based on the time of divergence and phylogenies that indicated paraphyly in earlier morphological classifications. Aside from anticipating and detecting the sources of zoonotic disease, as carriers of the potentially lethal coronavirus species (especially those of human-lethal Betacoronavirus-b group), the treatment allows the identification of Evolutionary Significant Units within the hipposiderid, rhinolophid and the rhinonycterid lineages.

A common name for what Gray referred as 'leaf-nosed bats' in establishing the Rhinonycterina, and later authors labelled 'Old World leaf-nosed bats' in transposing the name for hipposiderid species, has been proposed as trident bats (Armstrong, et al, 2016).

== Diversity ==
The genus Rhinonicteris is unusual in becoming endemic to Australia, whereas the other genera are found in Africa and Madagascar, and the fossil record supports the terrestrial radiation of the family. One hypothesis is they may have aerially dispersed to new regions by island hopping, a proposed explanation for Allodapine bees that dispersed from Africa to Australia during the same epochs. The earliest dates for the arrival of the family in Australia coïncides with the arrival of Brachipposideros nooraleebus, and both are thought to have migrated through Europe and Asia to arrive and diverge at the Australian continent around 15 to 20 Ma.

The Australian Faunal Directory recognised extant taxa occurring in Australia;

- family Rhinonycteridae. elevated by Foley, et al, 2014.
  - genus Rhinonicteris J.E. Gray, 1847
    - species Rhinonicteris aurantia (J.E. Gray, 1845).
      - Rhinonicteris aurantia (Pilbara form) recognised as an isolated group
    - species Rhinonicteris tedfordi Hand, 1993. A fossil taxon of the Miocene period, the earliest of the Australian rhinonycterid lineage.

The 2014 revision presents a separation as three families, equivalent to other mammalian taxonomic arrangements, and incorporates a clade identifying the type Rhinonicteris aurantia with genera Paratriaenops, Triaenops and Cloeotis. The three groups, the hipposiderid, rhinolophid and rhinonycterid families, were tested by several genomic and morphological studies that strongly supported monophyletic lineages. The families all appear to have diverged from a common ancestor around 42 Ma, and the Hipposideridae and Rhinonycteridae at approximately 39 Ma. The origin of the family is determined to be the African continent.

The arrangement of the family, with the subsequent inclusion of Miocene taxa, may be summarised as:

- family Hipposideridae.
- family Rhinolophidae.
- family Rhinonycteridae. elevated by Foley, et al, 2014.
  - genus Cloeotis
  - genus †Brevipalatus
  - genus †Brachipposideros
  - genus Paratriaenops
  - genus Rhinonicteris J.E. Gray, 1847
  - genus Triaenops
