= Wangi Falls =

Waterfall in the Northern Territory, Australia

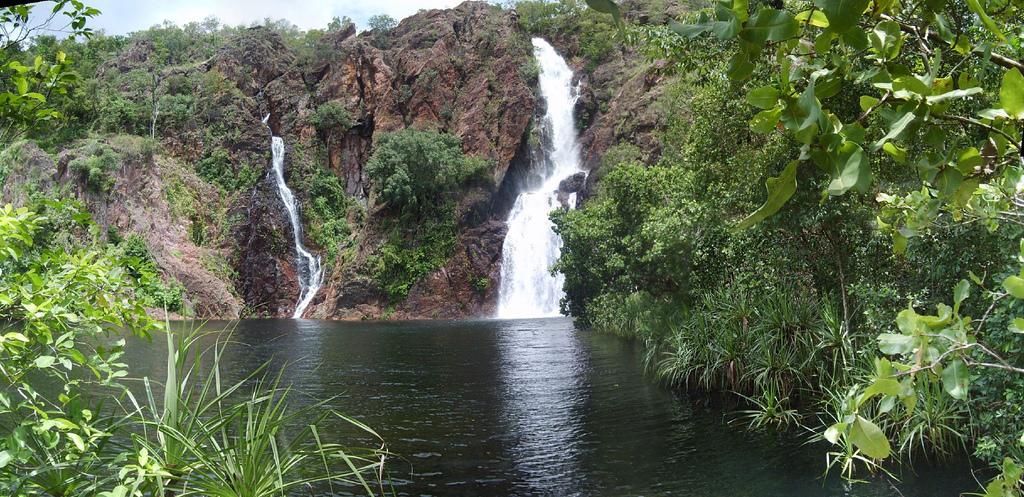
- Wangi Falls in Litchfield National Park

- Location within Northern Territory
- Location: Litchfield National Park, Northern Territory, Australia
- Coordinates: 13°09′49″S 130°41′07″E
- Type: Segmented
- Elevation: 84 metres (276 ft) AHD
- Total height: 41–52 metres (135–171 ft)
- Number of drops: 1
- Watercourse: Wangi Creek

Wangi Falls (Kungarakany: Ngantjurr) is a segmented waterfall on the Wangi Creek located within Litchfield National Park in the Northern Territory of Australia.

== Location and features ==
The waterfall descends from an elevation of 84 metres (276 ft) above sea level via a series of segmented tiers that range in height between 41–52 metres (135–171 ft). Accessed by sealed road, the falls are found near the western boundary of the park, approximately 80 kilometres (50 mi) south of Darwin.

The plunge pool at the base of the falls is a popular swimming spot, however is often closed following significant rainfall due to sightings of crocodiles in the area.

== See also ==
- List of waterfalls
- List of waterfalls of the Northern Territory
