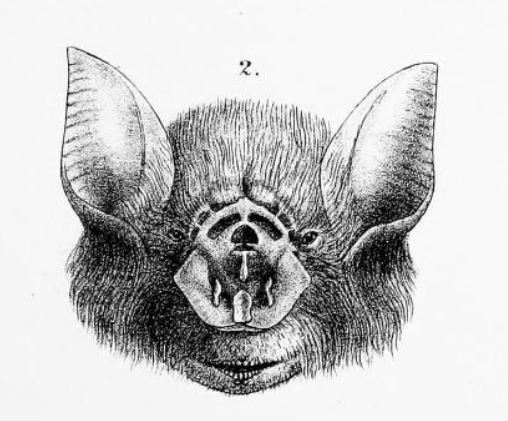

Scientific classification
- Kingdom: Animalia
- Phylum: Chordata
- Class: Mammalia
- Order: Chiroptera
- Family: Rhinonycteridae
- Genus: Rhinonicteris; Gray, 1847
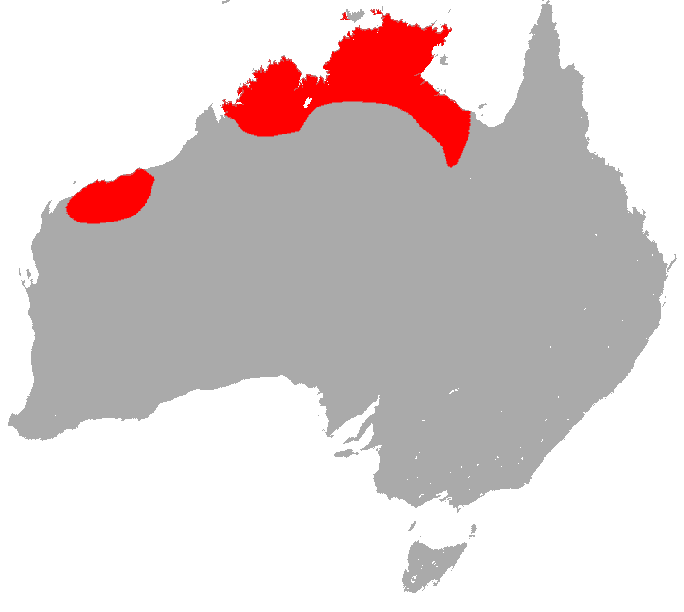
- Orange leaf-nosed bat range

= Rhinonicteris =

Genus of bats

Rhinonicteris is a genus of leaf-nosed microbats, represented by fossil taxa found at Riverleigh in Queensland and the extant species Rhinonicteris aurantia, which occurs in the north and west of the Australian continent.

The genus was erected by Gray in 1847 to separate the species Rhinonicteris aurantia, nominating it as the type and only species. The genus name published as Rhinonycteris Gray, J.E. 1866 has been regarded as a later correction by Gray, but this has also been determined to be an unjustified emendation.

The genus is placed with the family Hipposideridae, the subject of taxonomic instability that has seen itself reduced in rank to a subfamily of Rhinolophidae. A revision in 2014 reëlevated a subfamilial taxon as family Rhinonycteridae, which includes described and proposed fossil taxa:

- family Rhinonycteridae. elevated by Foley, et al, 2014.
  - genus Rhinonicteris J.E. Gray, 1847
    - species Rhinonicteris aurantia (J.E. Gray, 1845).
      - Rhinonicteris aurantia (Pilbara form) recognised as an isolated group
    - species Rhinonicteris tedfordi Hand, 1997. Fossil taxon.
