= Tolmer Falls =

Waterfall in the Northern Territory, Australia

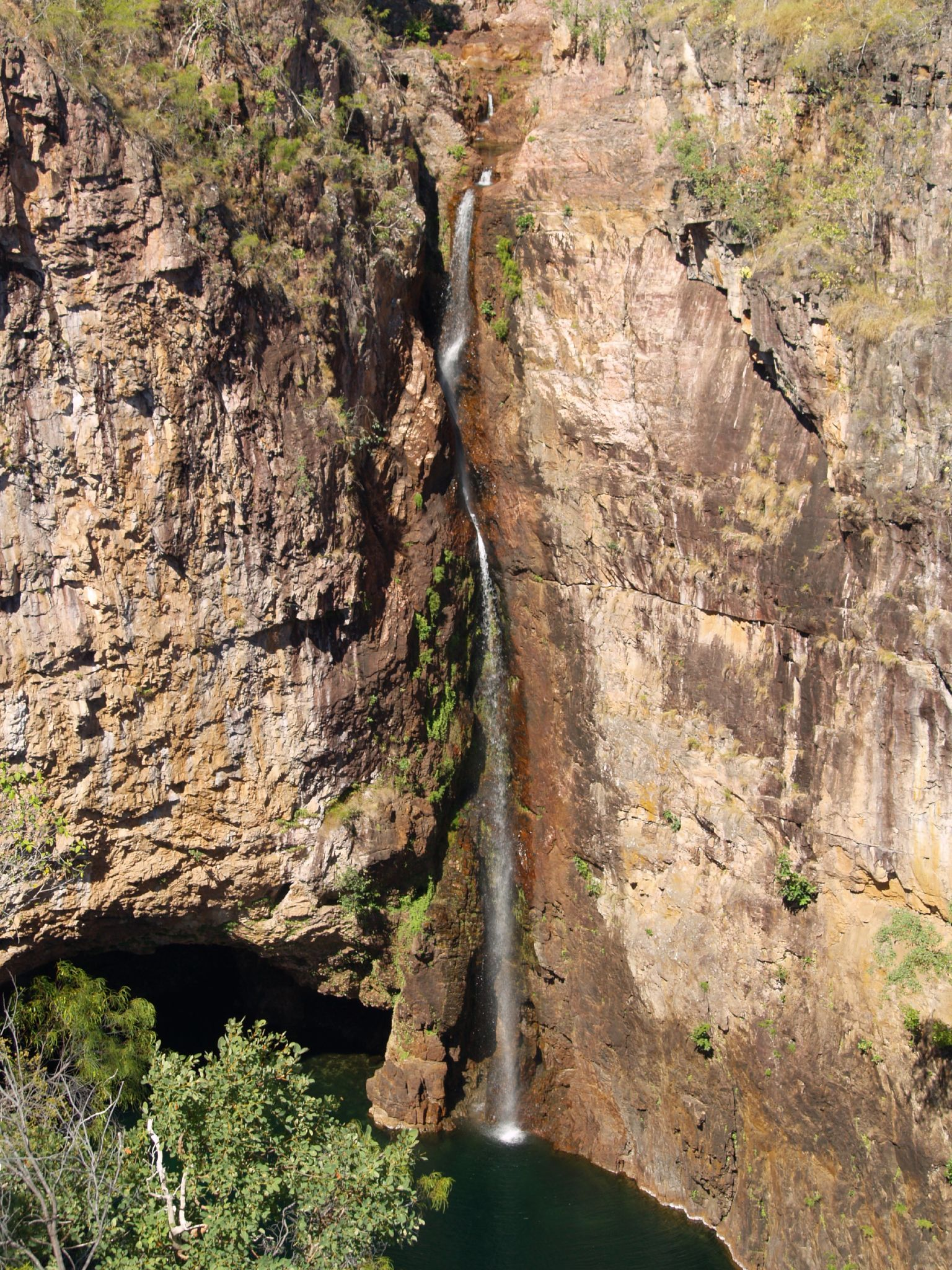

- Location within Northern Territory
- Location: Litchfield National Park, Northern Territory, Australia
- Coordinates: 13°12′20″S 130°42′52″E
- Type: Plunge
- Elevation: 102 metres (335 ft) AHD
- Total height: 32–42 metres (105–138 ft)
- Number of drops: 2
- Watercourse: Tolmer Creek

Tolmer Falls is a plunge waterfall on the Tolmer Creek in Litchfield National Park in the Northern Territory of Australia.

== Location and features ==
The waterfall descends from an elevation of 102 metres (335 ft) above sea level in two drops that range in height between 32–42 metres (105–138 ft) into a plunge pool. Accessed by sealed road, the falls are near the western boundary of the national park, approximately 85 kilometres (53 mi) south of Darwin.

The falls were named by explorer Frederick Henry Litchfield after his late father's colleague in the South Australia Police, Alexander Tolmer.

The site is noted for the large colony of orange leaf-bat Rhinonicteris aurantia, which number in their thousands.

== See also ==
- List of waterfalls
- List of waterfalls in Australia
