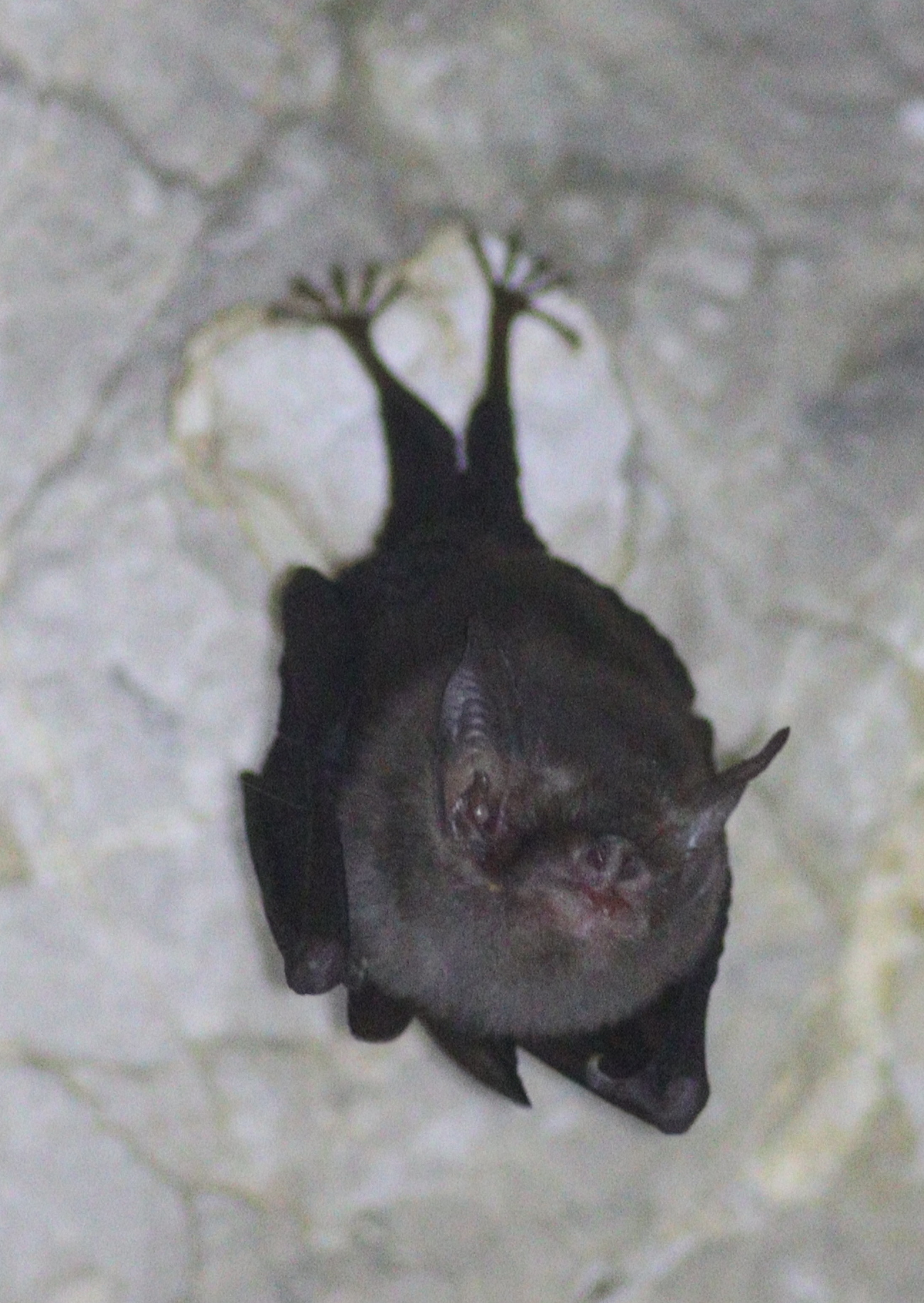

Conservation status
- Near Threatened (IUCN 3.1)

Scientific classification
- Kingdom: Animalia
- Phylum: Chordata
- Class: Mammalia
- Order: Chiroptera
- Superfamily: Rhinolophoidea
- Family: Craseonycteridae; Hill, 1974
- Genus: Craseonycteris; Hill, 1974
- Species: C. thonglongyai

Binomial name
- Craseonycteris thonglongyai Hill, 1974
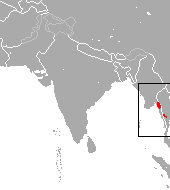
- Kitti's hog-nosed bat range

= Kitti's hog-nosed bat =

Species of bat

Kitti's hog-nosed bat (Craseonycteris thonglongyai), also known as the bumblebee bat or hog-nosed bat, is a near-threatened species of bat and the only extant member of the family Craseonycteridae. It occurs in western Thailand and southeast Myanmar, where it occupies limestone caves along rivers.

Kitti's hog-nosed bat is the smallest species of bat and arguably the world's smallest mammal by body length (the Etruscan shrew is regarded as the smallest by body mass). It has a reddish-brown or grey coat, with a distinctive pig-like snout. Colonies range greatly in size, with an average of 100 individuals per cave. The bat feeds during short activity periods in the evening and dawn, foraging around nearby forest areas for insects. Females give birth annually to a single offspring.

Although the bat's status in Myanmar is not well known, the Thai population is restricted to a single province and may be at risk of extinction. Its potential threats are primarily anthropogenic, and include habitat degradation and the disturbance of roosting sites.

== Description ==
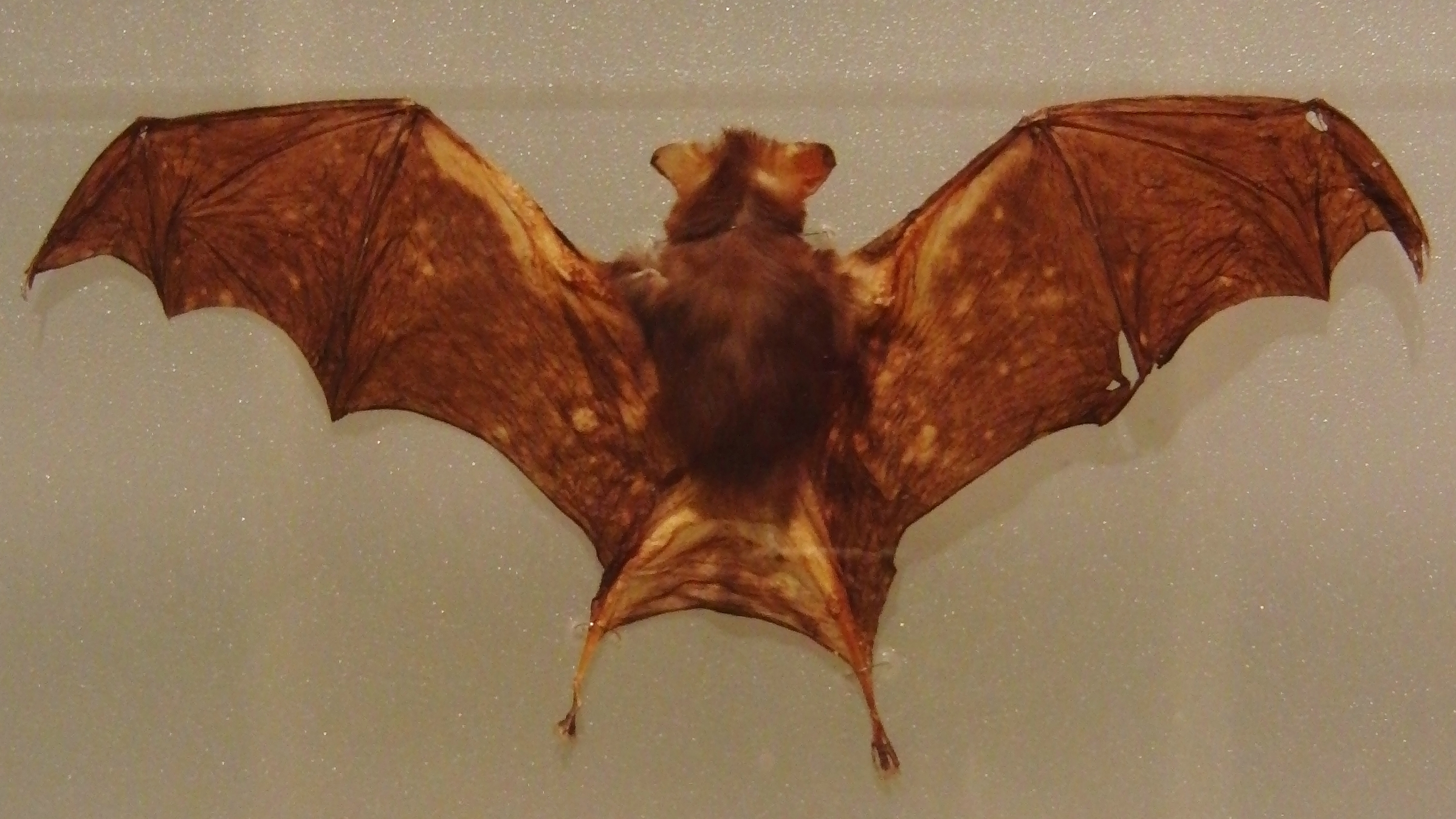
Stuffed specimen at the National Museum of Nature and Science, Tokyo, Japan.

Kitti's hog-nosed bat measures approximately 29–33 mm (1.1–1.3 in) long and weighs around 2 g (0.071 oz), earning its common name "bumblebee bat". It is the smallest bat species and potentially the world's smallest mammal by body length, though this distinction depends on the measurement criteria used. The main competitors for the title are small shrews; in particular, the Etruscan shrew may be lighter at 1.2 to 2.7 g (0.042 to 0.095 oz) but its body is longer, measuring 36 to 53 mm (1.4 to 2.1 in) from its head to the base of the tail.

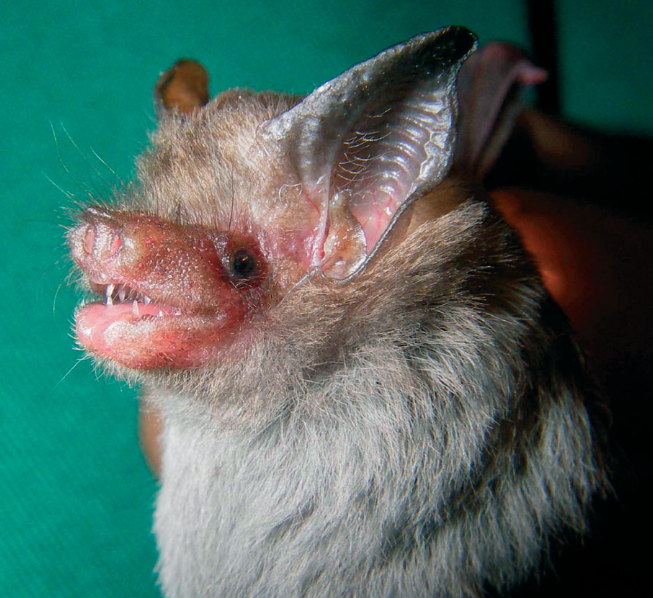
Close-up, showing the bat's snout.

The bat has a distinctive swollen, pig-like snout with thin, vertical nostrils. Its ears are relatively large, while its eyes are small and mostly concealed by fur. In the jaw, the premaxillae are not fused with surrounding bones, and the coronoid process is significantly reduced. Its teeth are typical of an insectivorous bat. The dental formula is 1.1.1.32.1.2.3. The upper incisors are notably enlarged.

The bat's upperparts are reddish-brown or grey, while the underside is generally paler. The wings are relatively large and darker in colour, with long tips that allow the bat to hover. The second digit of the wing is made of a single short phalanx, and the humerus has an increased number of locking tubercles on its head and beyond. There is a considerable fusion in the axial skeleton, concerning the thoracic (three posterior vertebrae), lumbar (two posterior) and sacral (all) sections. The bat has particularly slender legs, with rather thin fibula. Despite having two caudal vertebrae, Kitti's hog-nosed bat has no visible tail. There is a large web of skin between the hind legs (the uropatagium) which may assist in flying and catching insects, although there are no tail bones or calcars to help control it in flight.

== Range and habitat ==
Kitti's hog-nosed bat occupies limestone caves along rivers within dry evergreen or deciduous forests. In Thailand, it is restricted to a small region of the Tenasserim Hills in Sai Yok District, Kanchanaburi Province, within the drainage basin of the Khwae Noi River. While Sai Yok National Park in the Dawna Hills contains much of the bat's range, some Thai populations occur outside the park and are therefore unprotected.

Since the 2001 discovery of a single individual in Myanmar, at least nine separate sites have been identified in the limestone outcrops of the Dawna and Karen Hills outside the Thanlwin, Ataran, and Gyaing Rivers of Kayin and Mon States. The Thai and Myanmar populations are morphologically identical, but their echolocation calls are distinct. It is not known whether the two populations are reproductively isolated.

== Biology ==
Kitti's hog-nosed bat roosts in caves in limestone hills, far from the entrance. While many caves contain only 10 to 15 individuals, the average group size is 100, with a maximum of about 500. Individuals roost high on walls or roof domes, far apart from each other. Bats also undertake seasonal migration between caves.

Kitti's hog-nosed bat has a brief activity period, leaving its roost for only 30 minutes in the evening and 20 minutes at dawn. These short flights are easily interrupted by heavy rain or cold temperatures. During this period, the bat forages within fields of cassava and kapok or around the tops of bamboo clumps and teak trees, within one kilometre of the roosting site. The wings seem to be shaped for hovering flight, and the gut contents of specimens include spiders and insects that are presumably gleaned off foliage. Nevertheless, most prey is probably caught in flight. Main staples of the bat's diet include small flies (Chloropidae, Agromyzidae, and Anthomyiidae), hymenopterans, psocopterans, and spiders.

Late in the dry season (around April) of each year, females give birth to a single offspring. During feeding periods, the young either stays in the roost or remains attached to the mother at one of her two vestigial pubic nipples.

== Taxonomy ==
Kitti's hog-nosed bat is the only extant species in the family Craseonycteridae, which is grouped in the superfamily Rhinolophoidea as a result of molecular testing. Based on this determination, the bat's closest relatives are members of the families Hipposideridae and Rhinopomatidae.

Kitti's hog-nosed bat was unknown to the world at large prior to 1974. Its common name refers to its discoverer, Thai zoologist Kitti Thonglongya. Thonglongya worked with a British partner, John E. Hill, in classifying bats of Thailand; after Thonglongya died suddenly in February 1974, Hill formally described the species, giving it the binomial name Craseonycteris thonglongyai in honour of his colleague.

== Conservation ==
As of the species' review in 2019, Kitti's hog-nosed bat is listed by the IUCN as near-threatened, with a downward population trend.

Soon after the bat's discovery in the 1970s, some roosting sites became disturbed as a result of tourism, scientific collection, and even the collection and sale of individuals as souvenirs. However, these pressures may not have had a significant effect on the species as a whole, since many small colonies exist in hard-to-access locations, and only a few major caves were disturbed. Another potential risk is the activity of local monks, who have occupied roost caves during periods of meditation.

Currently, the most significant and long-term threat to the Thai population could be the annual burning of forest areas, which is most prevalent during the bat's breeding season. In addition, the proposed construction of a gas pipeline from Myanmar to Thailand may have a negative impact. Threats to the Myanmar population are not well known.

In 2007, Kitti's hog-nosed bat was identified by the Evolutionarily Distinct and Globally Endangered project as one of its Top 10 "focal species".

== See also ==
- Smallest organisms
