= Florence Falls =

Waterfall in the Northern Territory, Australia

Florence Falls Karrimurra
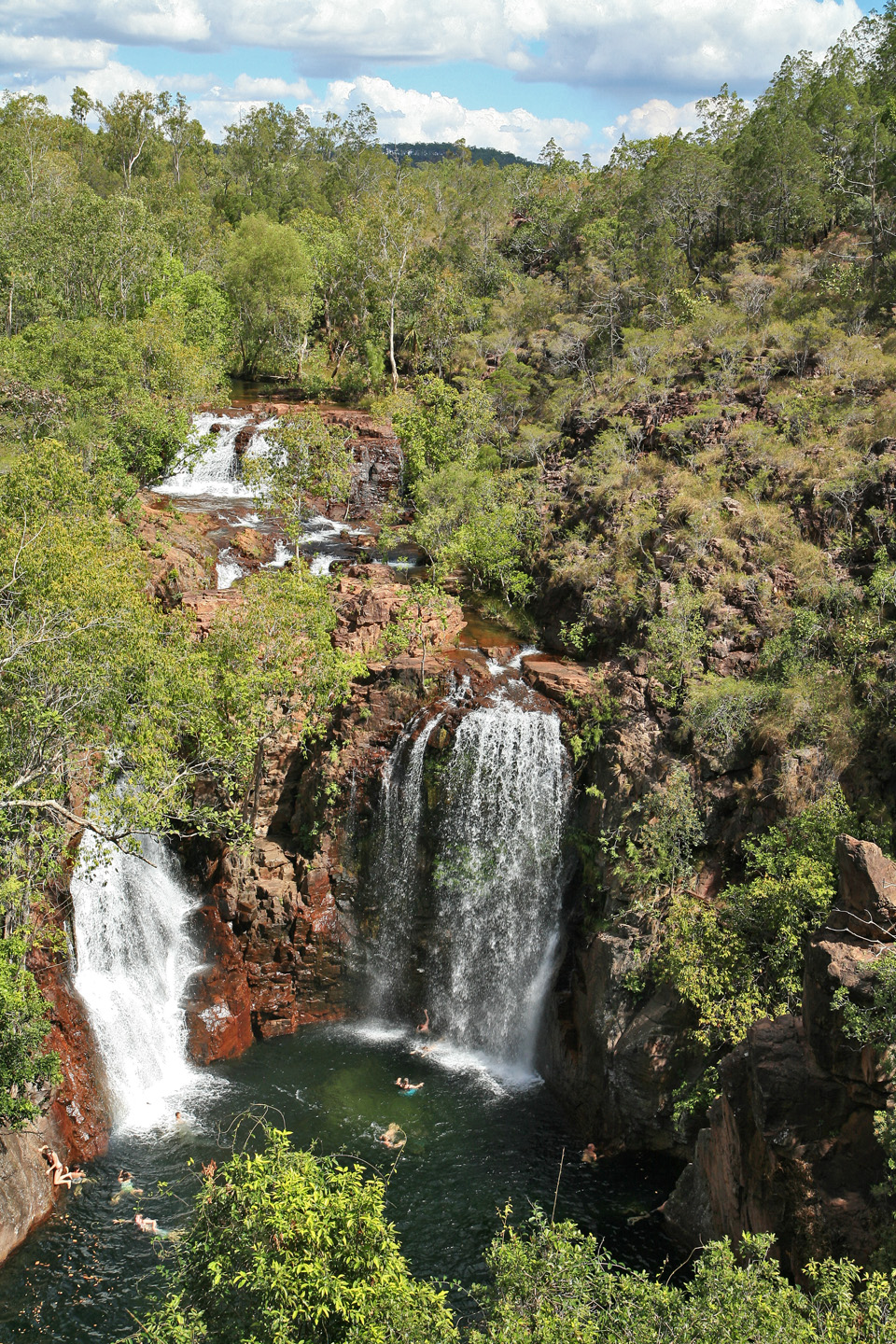
- Florence Falls in May 2007

- Location within Northern Territory
- Location: Litchfield National Park, Northern Territory, Australia
- Coordinates: 13°05′56″S 130°46′50″E
- Type: Segmented
- Elevation: 64 metres (210 ft) AHD
- Total height: 9.8–15 metres (32–49 ft)
- Number of drops: 1
- Watercourse: Florence Creek

Florence Falls (Aboriginal: Karrimurra) is a segmented waterfall on the Florence Creek located within Litchfield National Park in the Northern Territory of Australia.

== Location and features ==
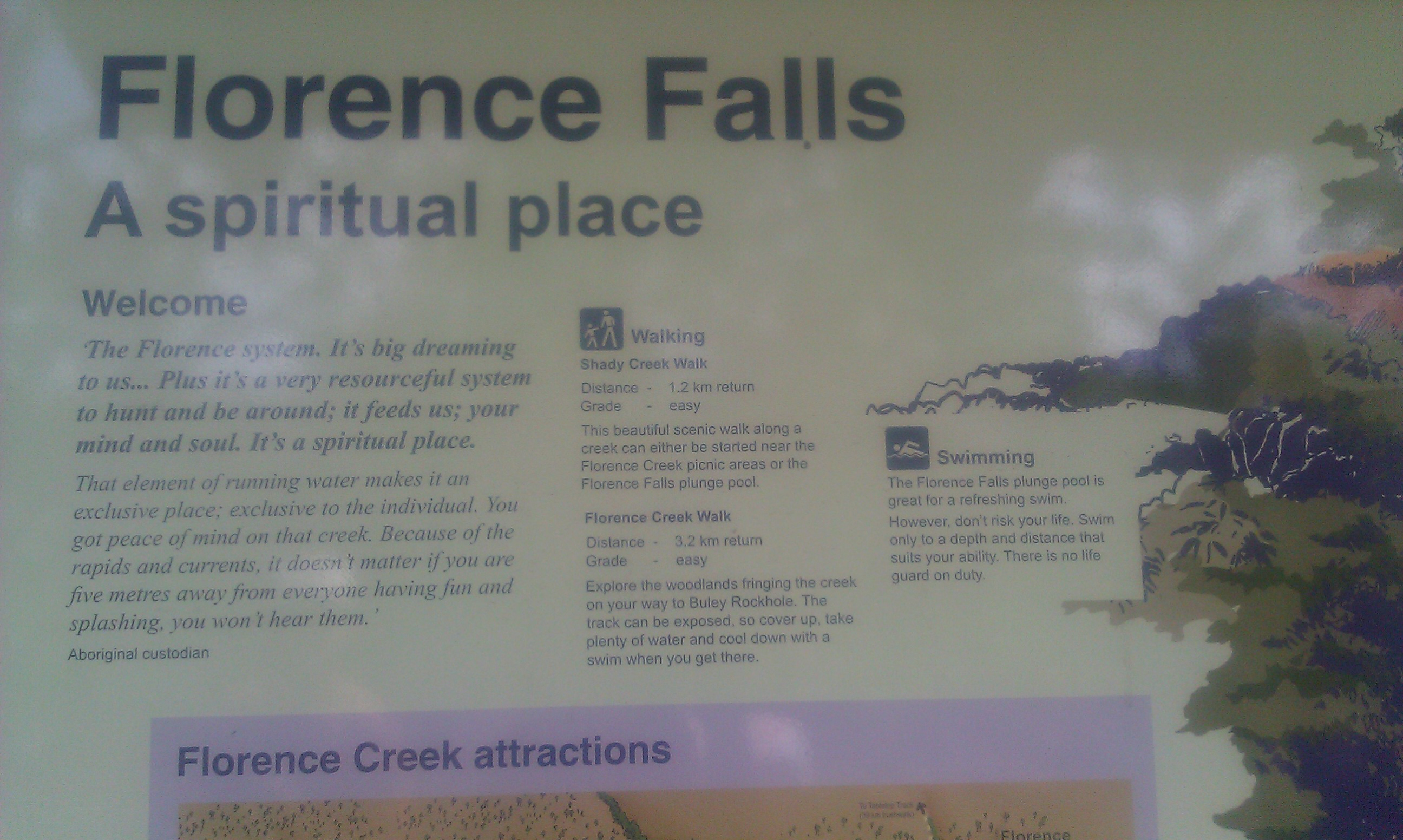
A sign post near the falls.

The waterfall descends from an elevation of 64 metres (210 ft) above sea level via a series of segmented tiers that range in height between 9.8–15 metres (32–49 ft). Accessed by sealed road, the falls are found near the northern boundary of the national park, approximately 80 kilometres (50 mi) south of Darwin.

A sign post at Florence Falls mentions two walks for hiking. The 'Shady Creek Walk' is graded easy with a distance of 1.2 kilometres (0.75 mi) return. The 'Florence Creek Walk' is also graded easy with a distance of 3.2 kilometres (2.0 mi) return. The Florence Falls plunge pool is listed as "great for a refreshing swim" besides the usual safety warnings.

== See also ==
- List of waterfalls
- List of waterfalls of the Northern Territory
