= Brachipposideros nooraleebus =

Scientific classification
- Domain: Eukaryota
- Kingdom: Animalia
- Phylum: Chordata
- Class: Mammalia
- Order: Chiroptera
- Family: Rhinonycteridae
- Genus: †Brachipposideros
- Species: †B. nooraleebus

Binomial name
- †Brachipposideros nooraleebus (Sige, Hand & Archer, 1982)

Synonyms
- Hipposideros nooraleebus Sige, Hand & Archer, 1982

Extinct species of bat

Brachipposideros nooraleebus is an extinct species of bat, known from a large series of fossil specimens found at Riversleigh fossil site in Australia. The nearest living relative is the orange horseshoe bat, Rhinonicteris aurantia, which occurs in the same area.

== Description ==
A hipposiderid that resembles the extant species Rhinonicteris aurantia, and related to 'leaf-nosed' bats found on other continents. The leaf-shaped structure is an elaborate and fleshy arrangement that assisted the bat to locate its assumed prey, flying insects, by manipulating the high frequency sound used in echolocation. The ultra high frequency sound is produced in the larynx and emitted through the nose. Like other bats, the shape of the ears was attuned to receive the reflected sound, and is grooved in appearance. As with other hipposiderids, a protuberance at the ear—the enlarged and fleshy tragus found in other bat species—is absent.

The wingspan was around 150 millimetres. They inhabited limestone caves in large numbers, up to five thousand, during a period 24–16 million years ago; this is supported by the evidence at Riversleigh, They are thought to have existed until the early Miocene. Another bat species that was fossilised in the region was Australonycteris clarkae, which existed during the early Eocene period (55mya) and is amongst the most ancient to have been discovered.

The nearest known relations are extant species in Madagascar and Vietnam and extinct bat taxa in France and the Arabian Peninsula. The species has been referred to as the Riversleigh leaf-nosed bat.
