= Litchfield National Park =

National park in the Northern Territory, Australia

- IUCN category II (national park)
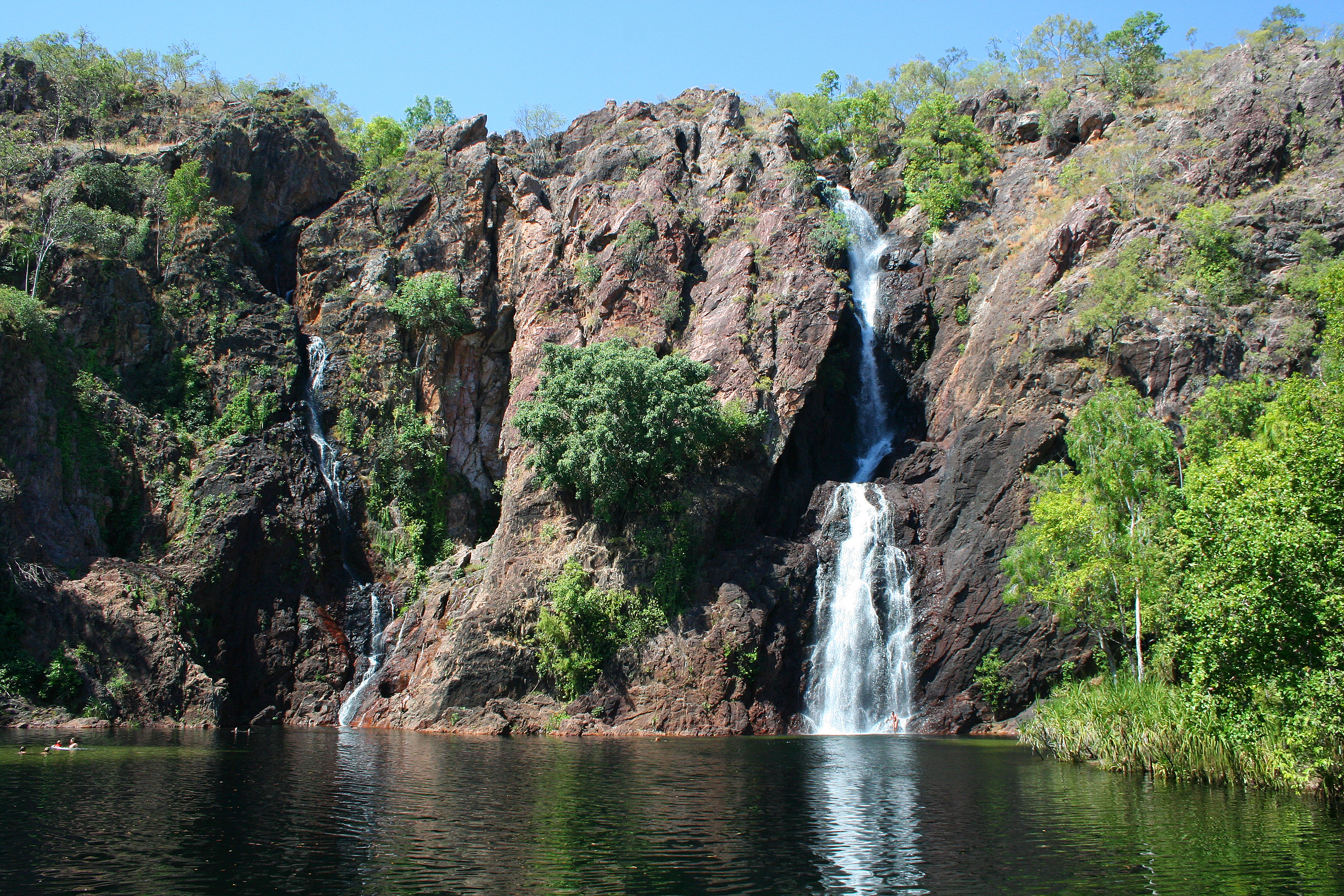
- Wangi Falls

- Location within Northern Territory
- Location: Northern Territory
- Nearest city: Adelaide River
- Coordinates: 13°16′45″S 130°52′36″E
- Area: 1,458.47 km^{2} (563.12 sq mi)
- Established: 29 July 1991
- Visitors: 329,600 (in 2017)
- Governing body: Parks and Wildlife Commission of the Northern Territory
- Website: Official website

Litchfield National Park, covering approximately 1,500 km^{2}, is near the township of Batchelor, 100 km south-west of Darwin, in the Northern Territory of Australia. Each year the park attracts over 329,000 visitors.

Proclaimed a national park in 1986, it is named after Frederick Henry Litchfield, a Territory pioneer, who explored areas of the Northern Territory from Escape Cliffs in Van Diemen Gulf to the Daly River in 1864.

== History ==
=== Early history ===
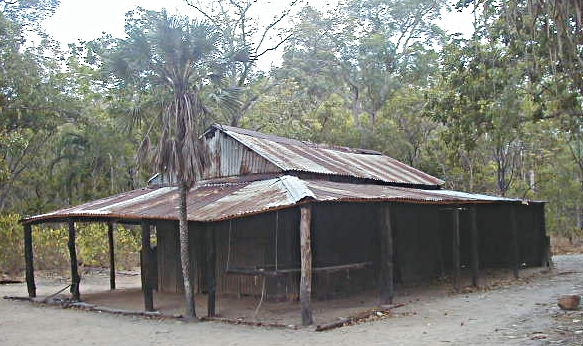
Blythe homestead

Aboriginal people have lived throughout the area for thousands of years. It is important to the Kungarakan and Marranunggu peoples for whom their ancestral spirits, still considered actively present in the landscape, played a seminal role in forming the landscape, plants and animals of this area.

=== Recent history ===
The park was named after Frederick Henry Litchfield, a member of the Finniss Expedition that travelled from South Australia in 1864. This was the first European expedition to visit the Top End of Australia by land and it was their aim to explore as widely as possible and establish a settlement at Escape Cliffs, on the mouth of the Adelaide River. Previous attempts at settlement of Australia's northern coast at Fort Dundas, Raffles Bay and Port Essington had already failed.

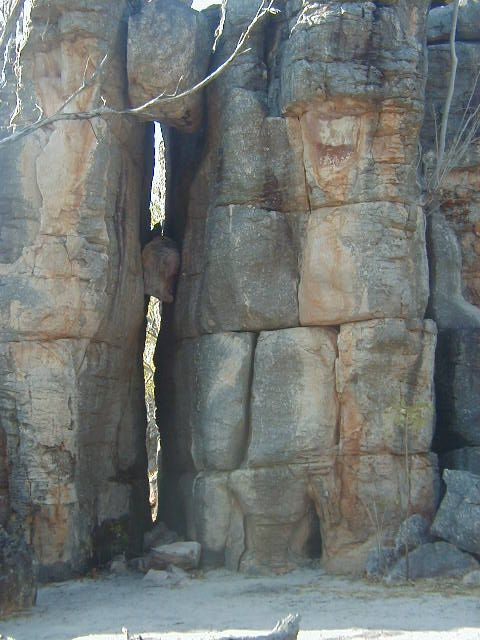
Lost city rock formation

The surveyor and soldier, Boyle Travers Finniss, was chosen by the South Australian government to be their government Resident in the Northern Territory. His decision to choose an area near Escape Cliffs for settlement was disastrous. The settlers suffered from inadequate food rations and infected mosquito bites. Finniss was disliked by the settlers who had accompanied him and argued with his officials.

The area which is now known as Litchfield National Park was first visited by Europeans in September 1865, when Litchfield led a small group to explore the Daly River. His diary of Monday, 25 September describes his travels:

"Monday, 25 – Three horses look as if they were going to knock up; will give them a day's spell here. There are fine plains here, splendidly grassed and watered; small belts of stunted gum, vaquois, fan palm, and honeysuckle. Most of the timber is small, but plenty of it is adapted for station purposes. The country from here to Manton's Creek on the Adelaide (River) is as fine a country for stock as I have ever seen, the whole of it being well grassed and well watered at all times of the year."

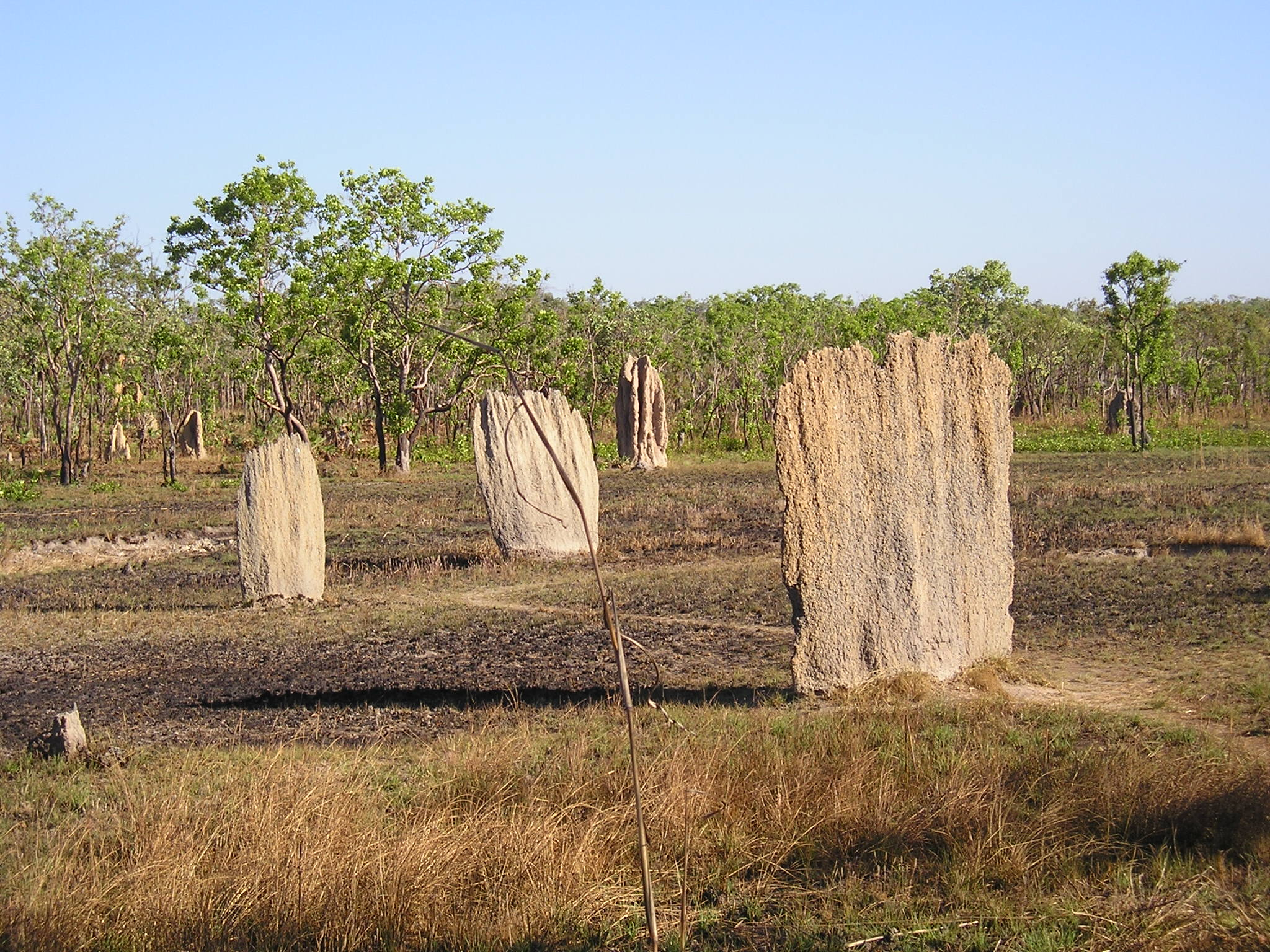
Termite mounds

The discovery of copper and tin led to the establishment of several small scale subsistence mining operations. Pastoral occupation also began in the 1870s, with loggers and graziers facing the difficult conditions of torrential rain, mosquitoes and sandflies.

In 1888 Mt Tolmer became the site of the first tin mine and produced a continual supply of tin. Bamboo Creek's tin mining operation began at Makanbarr, A Mak Mak Marranunggu campsite, in 1906. High-quality tin was often found in the ancient riverbeds and on the surface of the hills. All it needed was to be bagged and sold. Small groups operated this way for the next 30 years. By 1941 miners began following the tin-bearing seams into the hills using picks and shovels, and loading the ore into wagons to be pushed or pulled back to the mines' entrances.

Charles Stead, Thomas Niciloff and Charles Claydon took out the first real lease and set about turning the mine into a commercial venture, with the assistance of local Mak Mak Marranunggu men and women and some Europeans. However, the mine was closed in 1951 after a large flood filled many of the shafts with water. A relic of the old tin mine at Bamboo Creek stands as a reminder of the difficult conditions endured by the pioneer miners.

In 1924 a small homestead was built by the Sargent family on their leased land in the lowlands near Tolmer Falls where there was reliable water and reasonable grazing for their cattle. Their farm proved successful and in 1928 they built Blyth Homestead as an outstation a little further south, so their cattle could take advantage of the good grazing among the paperbarks in this area. Typical of other structures of that time, the homestead is supported with cypress pine tied together with heavy wire and covered with corrugated iron. The family was able to farm their own vegetable and fruit crops, and held up to 13,500 head of cattle, due to the permanent water nearby. After 40 years, the Sargent family sold the lease to the Townsend family who farmed until the early 1960s. The abandoned homestead stands as a stark reminder of the tough conditions graziers faced.

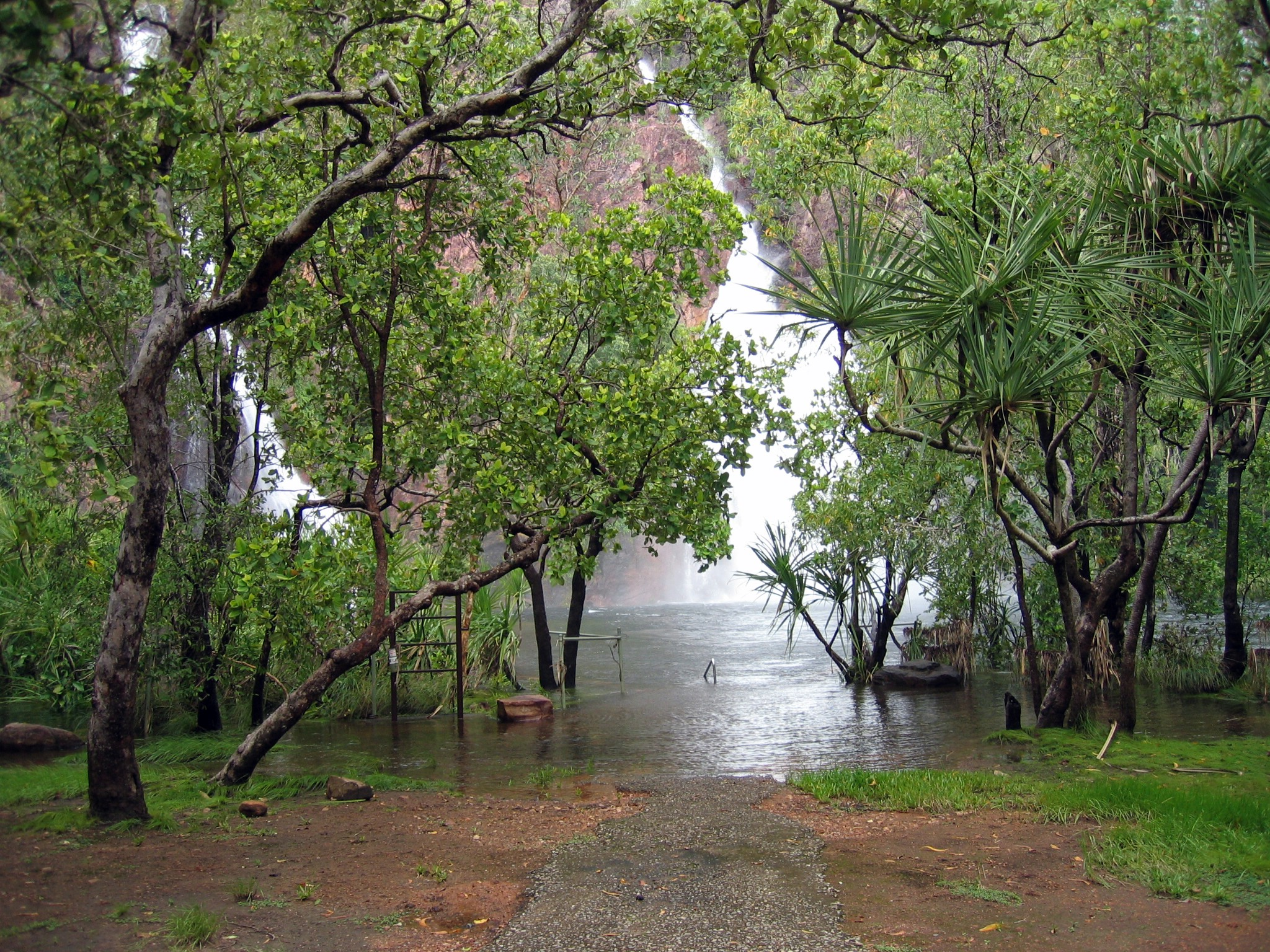
Natural forest

Logging of paperbark, cypress and Leichhardt pines began in 1948 in the north-western section of the park. Again, Aboriginal people assisted and ex-army equipment was utilized to take the timber to the mill where it was prepared for local builders.

Uranium was discovered outside what is now Litchfield's eastern boundary in August 1949, by a local prospector, Jack White. Australia's first fully operational uranium mine was opened at Rum Jungle, and underground mining occurred from 1950 to 1953. The name Rum Jungle is derived from an accident that occurred in 1871. A bullock-wagon load of rum, destined for the construction gangs, was said to have been bogged near a patch of jungle on the crocodile-inhabited East Finniss River - the bullockies untethered the oxen and set about drinking the rum, having one of history's most glorious binges. Production from the open cut area started in 1953 and proved to be one of the largest economic influences in the development of the Top End, with sales to the United Kingdom for their atomic weapons program. The mine closed in 1971.

The park was originally part of Stapleton Station, Tipperary Station and Camp Creek Station pastoral leases. The pastoral activity persisted until the declaration of the area as a national park when in 1985, the lessees of Stapleton Station negotiated the surrender of the pastoral lease and it was subsequently taken up by the Conservation Land Corporation.

== Flora ==
The Central sandstone plateau supports rich woodland flora communities dominated by species including Darwin woolybutt and Darwin stringybark, as well as banksias, grevilleas, terminalias and a wide variety of other woodland species.

Remnant pockets of monsoon rainforest thrive along the bottom of the escarpment, and in the deep narrow gorges created over thousands of years by the force of the waterfalls cutting into the escarpment walls.

They are significant because of their size and lack of disturbance. Here visitors will find lilies and slender ground orchids growing among Pandanus, paperbark and swamp bloodwoods.

=== Gamba Grass ===
The invasive species Andropogon gayanus, better known as gamba grass is a significant threat to the park's biodiversity due to the frequent, high intensity, late dry season wildfires it exacerbates. The grass was introduced into the Northern Territory of Australia in 1931 for trial as cattle feed. There are now large swathes of the plant over 532,900 hectares between Darwin and Katherine. Gamba grass already accounts for as much as 20% of Litchfield National Park, around 30,000 hectares of the 144,000-hectare park, contributing to worsening fire seasons. Researchers estimate that this will increase to as much as 30% by 2033, a major threat to the park's future due to the extreme fire risk, the severity of which can destroy locals species. Total eradication is no longer considered viable due to substantial spread since 2014.

== Fauna ==
Common wildlife species include the antilopine kangaroo, agile wallaby, sugar glider, northern brushtail possum, fawn antechinus, black and little red flying foxes and the dingo. The caves near Tolmer Falls are home to a colony of the rare orange leaf-nosed bat and the ghost bat.

Litchfield is a habitat for hundreds of native bird species. Black kites, and other birds of prey are common during the dry season. The yellow oriole, figbird, Pacific koel, spangled drongo, dollarbird and the rainbow bee-eater inhabit the sheltered areas close to waterfalls. A species of marsupial mouse (the northern dibbler), the rufous-tailed bush-hen, a frog (the pealing chirper) and the primitive archerfish, occur in the Wangi Falls area.

Wangi, Tolmer and Florence falls and Buley Rockhole, are popular with visitors and tour groups. The falls have large pools that attract birds and reptiles such as monitors. orange-footed scrubfowl, honeyeaters, figbirds and Torres Strait pigeons share the fruit and berries in the areas with nocturnal mammals like the northern quoll, northern brown bandicoot and northern brushtail possum. Frill-necked lizard are common throughout the park, but will not be seen as frequently during the cool dry season months. The Finniss River area also hosts a number of large saltwater crocodiles, commonly abbreviated as "salties".

The magnetic termite mounds are a popular tourist attraction. These wedge-shaped mounds are aligned in a north–south direction as a response to the environment. The termites which build them feed on grass roots and other plant debris found in plains which are seasonally flooded. Therefore, the termites are forced to remain above the water, in the mound. The alignment of the mound acts as a temperature regulator, and allows the temperature to remain stable.

== Sites designated for preservation ==
=== Bamboo Creek Tin Mine ===
Bamboo Creek tin mine is an example of small scale, labour-intensive mine operated without the benefit of heavy earth machinery. It was typical of many of the mines in the Northern Territory which operated in the nineteenth and early twentieth centuries, especially those operated by the Chinese. The remains include the mine workings; the tin processing mill; and the associated domestic and industrial remains. Tin was discovered at Bamboo Creek in 1906 and was mined irregularly until 1955. The wide variety of remains are notable in that they reflect the complete range of activities associated with underground mining. Artefacts relating to ore extraction, processing and transport are present as well as domestic remains and remnants of the explosives magazine.

=== Blyth Homestead ===
Blyth Homestead is of heritage significance to the Northern Territory due to its architectural and social significance. The remains consist of the homestead building itself which is a single room, cypress pine and corrugated iron structure encircled by verandahs; a flagstone floor; a scatter of corrugated iron, sandstone blocks and other metal objects; and a set of stockyards constructed using bush timber poles and barbed wire

The homestead was established in 1928 to function as an outstation on Stapleton Station, then owned by Harry Sargent and his family. It was constructed using bush timber (cypress pine) and iron in the form of a large central room that could be closed up with verandahs around the edges. Blyth Homestead is one of the few existing examples of this type of building which was formerly common on NT pastoral leases. The Homestead site contains tangible and well-preserved remnants of both pastoral and mining activities.

The isolated location necessitated the occupants to be virtually self-sufficient with a fruit and vegetable garden, milking cows and meat. A sawmilling plant was used to cut timber needed. Their income was supplemented by alluvial and reef tin mining to the east of the homestead, the products of which had to be carted by buckboard along a self-made track over the Finiss River.

As described by Max Sargent, the tenth of fourteen children of the Sargent family: "We were possibly the best fed people in Australia right through the depression, with butter, cream and milk, cheese, dried fruits and fresh fruits, fresh vegetables the year round, more than what we could use, but no money!"

The simple bush architecture of the homestead and the opportunistic nature of the mine workings illustrate the harsh conditions under which the Sargent family lived.

=== Greenant Creek ===
The area of Greenant Creek below the Tjaetaba Falls is a registered Aboriginal sacred site. Swimming or entering the water is not allowed. Visitors are requested to observe all signage.

=== Aboriginal sacred sites ===
There are several sacred and special sites within Litchfield National Park.

== Tourism ==
Every year over quarter of a million of visitors come to the park. Closer to Darwin than the Kakadu National Park, Litchfield National Park is less than two hours drive from the city via a sealed road that connects the township of Batchelor to the Cox Peninsula Road.

In 2021 a tourist from New South Wales appeared to have gone missing for two days after last being seen near the Wangi Falls campground, before being found alive and well.

== Attractions ==
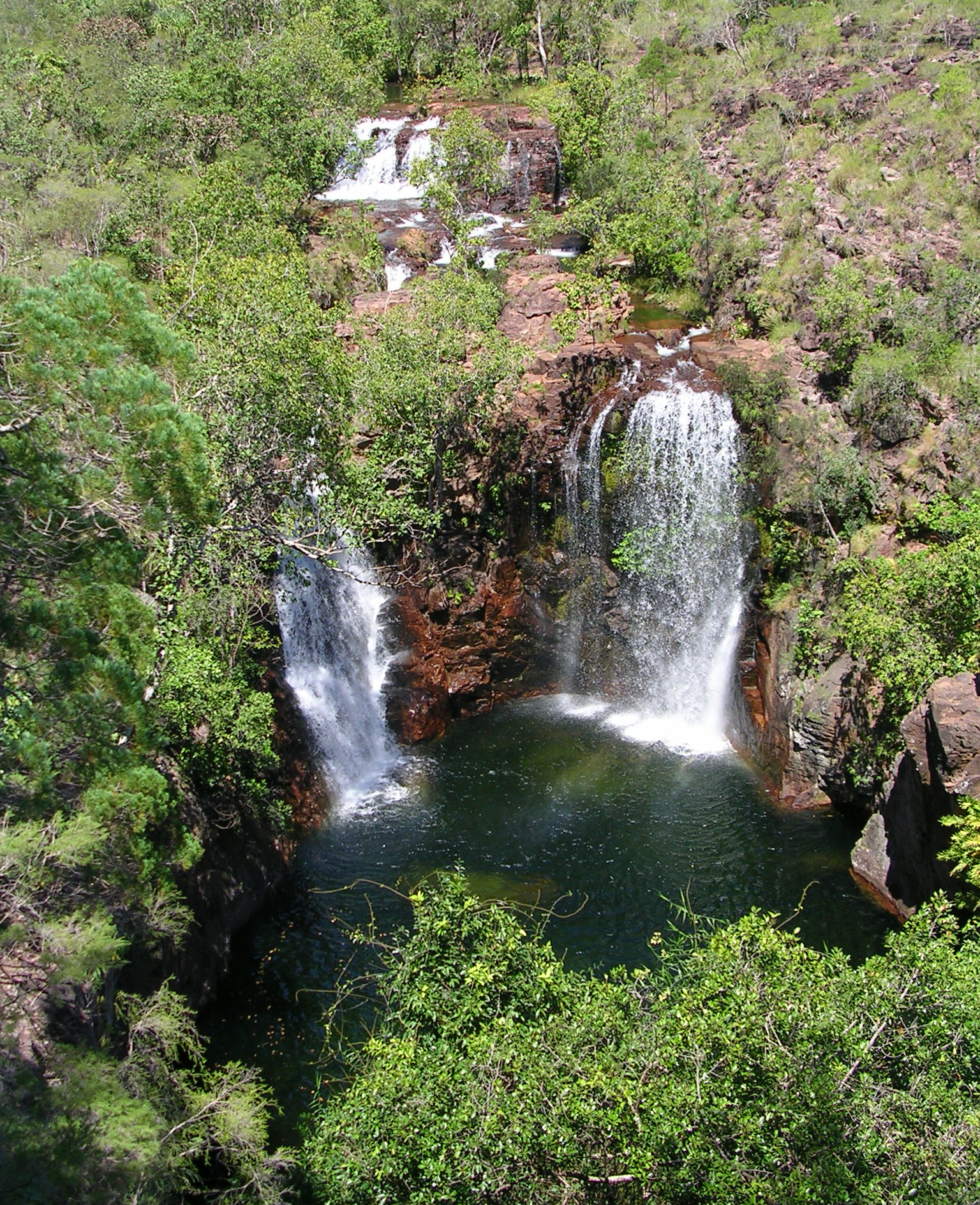
Sky view of Florence Falls

Most of the major attractions in the park are linked by sealed road and are easily accessed by two-wheel drive car. However, some of the more remote attractions require a four-wheel drive to access them. Details of some of the major attractions follow:

=== Florence Falls ===
Florence Falls is a double-plunge waterfall leading to a popular swimming hole.

=== Buley Rockhole ===
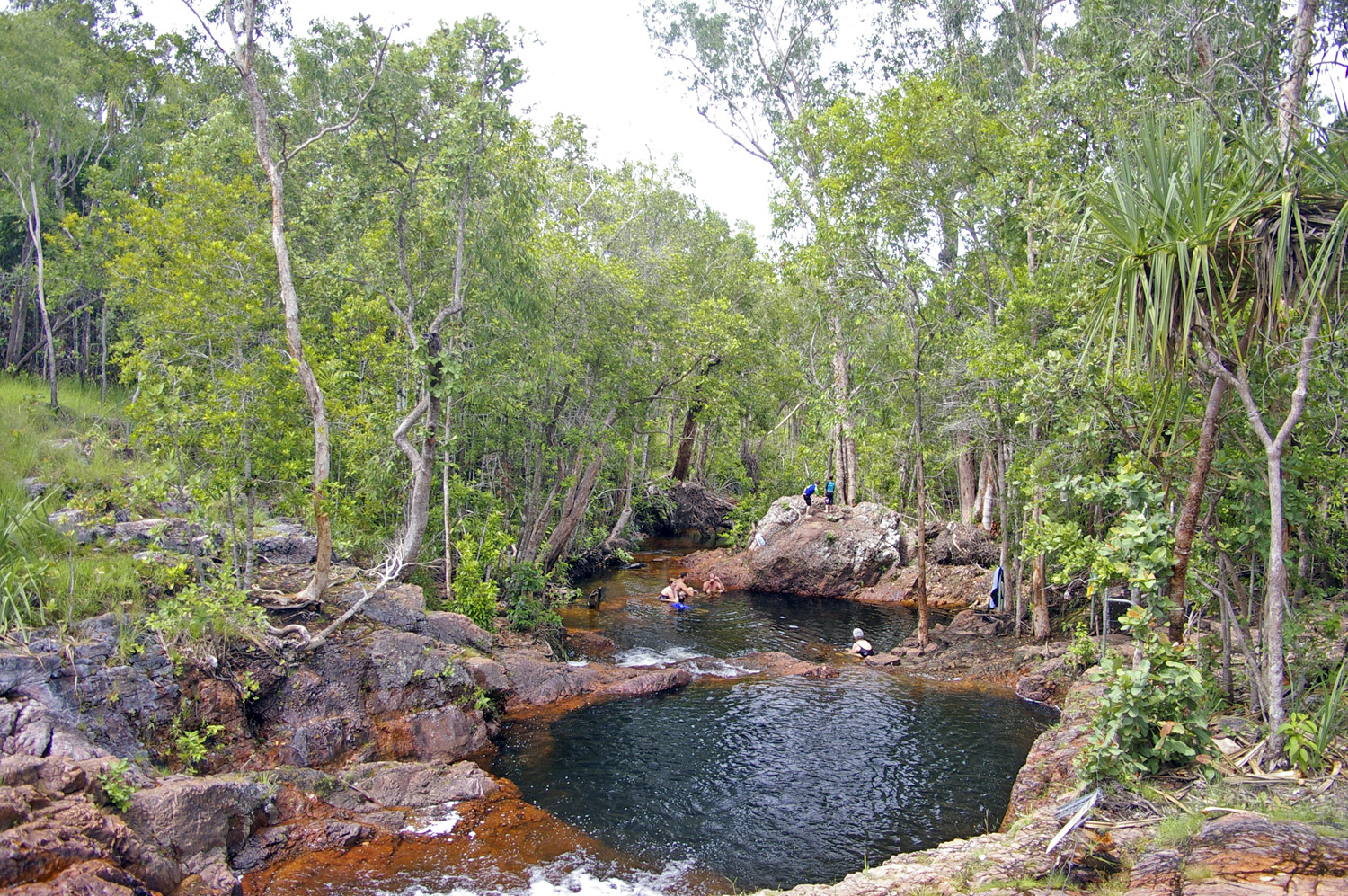
Buley Rockhole

Visitors to Buley Rockhole will find a long series of cascading plunge pools.

=== Wangi Falls ===
Possibly Litchfield's most popular attraction, Wangi Falls is easily accessible and open all year round. However, swimming is not always possible due to water levels from heavy rain.

The falls are located near the western edge of the park, around 150 kilometres south of Darwin.

=== Tolmer Falls ===
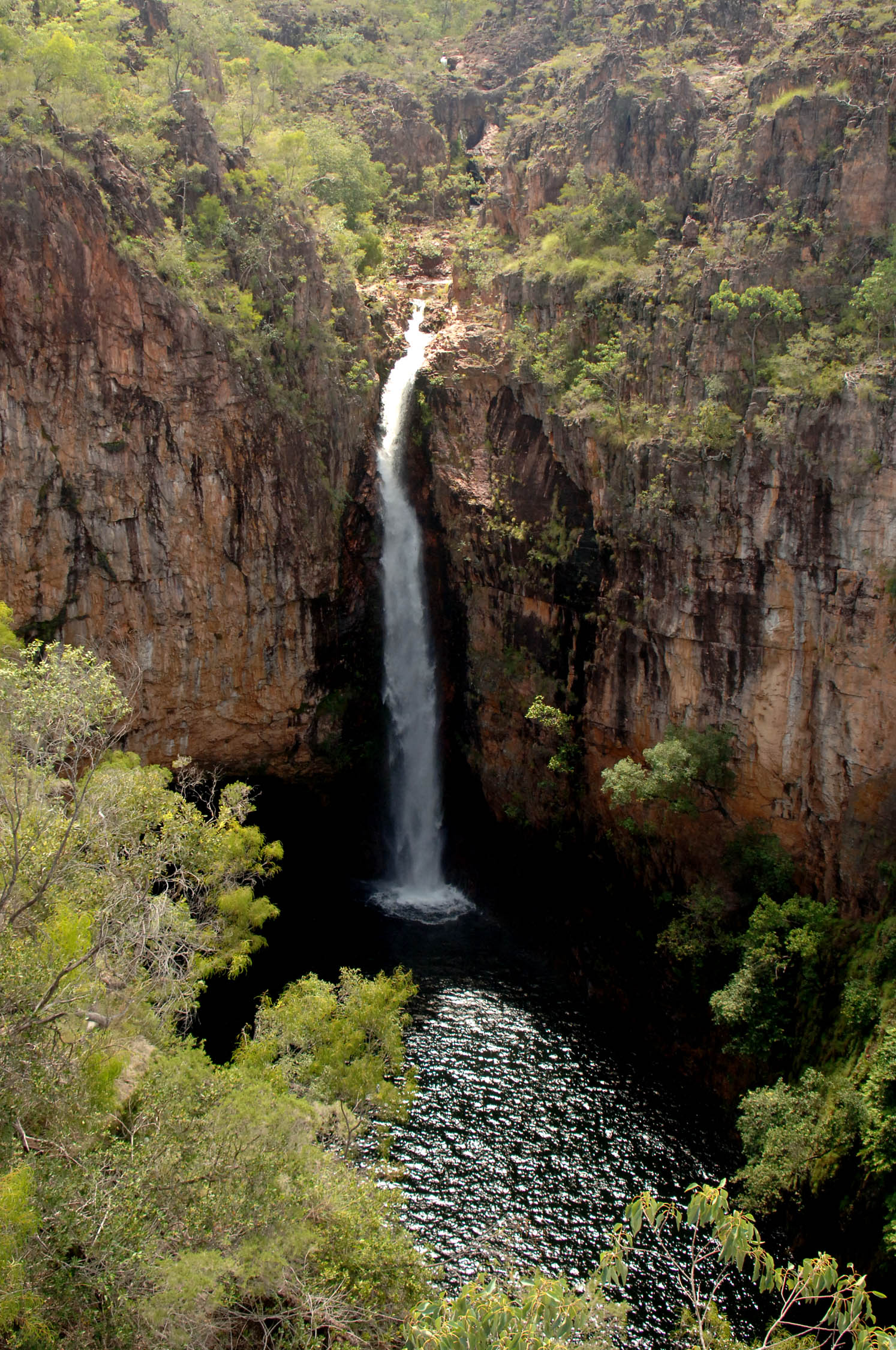
Tolmer Falls

Tolmer Falls cascades over two high escarpments into a deep plunge pool. The bottom of the falls is home to several colonies of rare ghost bats and orange horseshoe bats.

=== Tjaetaba Falls ===
Tjaetaba Falls is a drop along Greenant Creek, one of the smaller systems in the park. These falls and the area below them is an Aboriginal sacred site, and visitors are requested to swim only above the falls.

=== Tjaynera Falls (Sandy Creek) ===
After a moderate level, 3.5 km return walk through an open valley, visitors can enjoy the usually un-crowded plunge pool beneath Tjaynera Falls.

=== Surprise Creek Falls ===
These falls are open for swimming.

=== Blyth Homestead ===
This homestead, build in 1929, stands as a reminder of the tough conditions faced by the pioneers in remote areas.

Blyth Homestead was originally built on a neighbouring property to Stapleton Station, about 40km east of Adelaide River township, across the Tabletop Plateau.

=== Bamboo Creek ===
Interpretive signs explain the methods used to extract the tin and to help appreciate the hardship endured by miners as they struggled to make a living in intolerable conditions.

=== Magnetic termite mounds ===
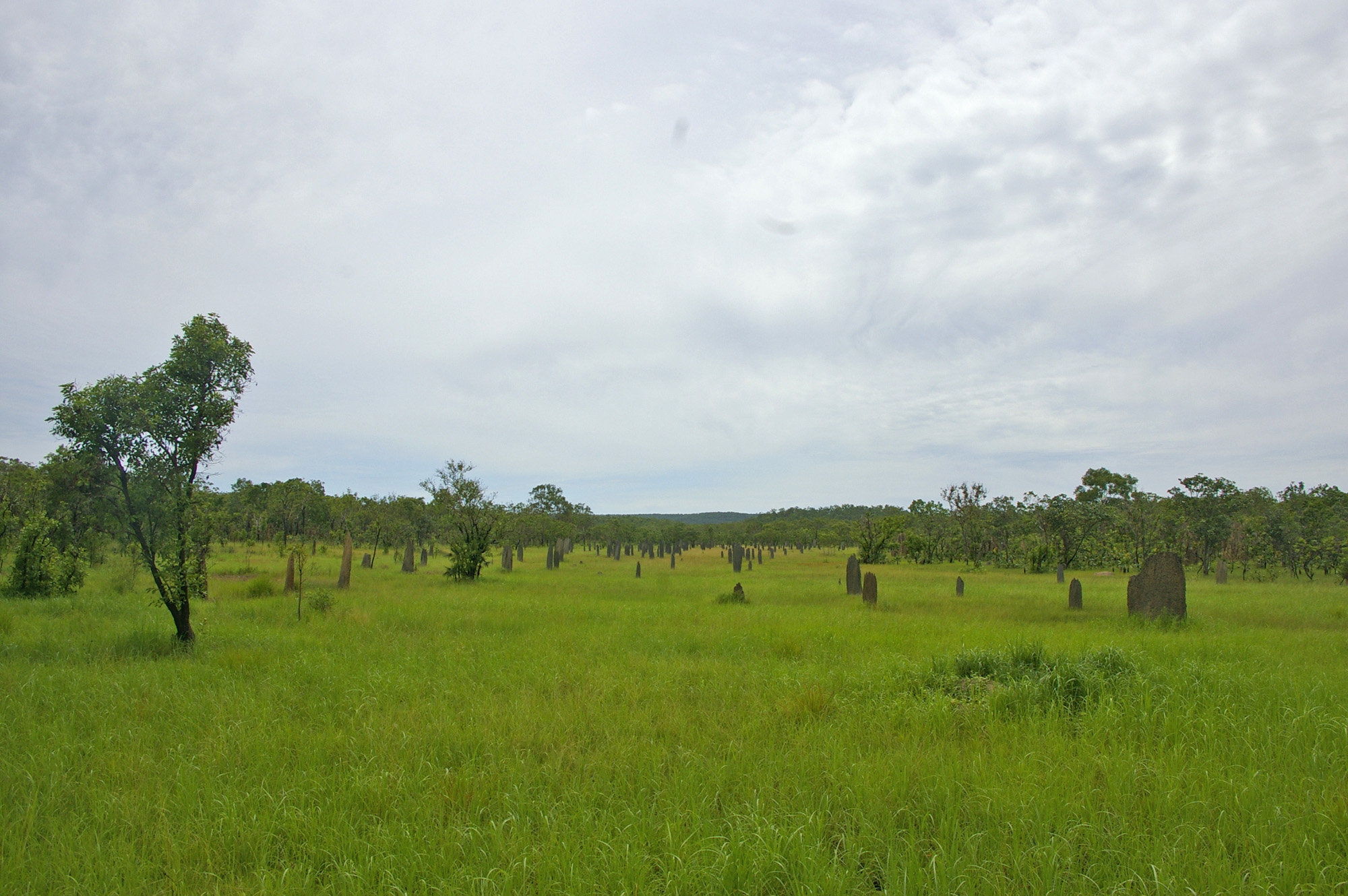
Magnetic termite mounds

These termite mounds are built by thousands of termites with a north–south orientation to control the temperature inside the mounds. The cathedral mounds which are substantially larger, are located not far away.

== Bushwalks ==
Litchfield National Park offers a wide range of walking tracks. It is strongly recommended that overnight walks are registered with the Overnight Walker Registration Scheme on telephone 1300 650 730. Walkers must camp in designated campgrounds.

=== Tabletop Track ===
The Tabletop Track, within Litchfield National Park, is a 39 kilometre bushwalk along trickling creeklines, cascading waterfalls, crystal clear pools and undisturbed pockets of tropical monsoon rainforest. Along this track, hikers will spot some of the local wildlife such as wallabies, possums, and flying foxes.

=== Florence Creek Walk ===
Forming part of the Tabletop Track in Litchfield National Park, this 22 kilometre walk will take you to Greenant Creek, through pockets of cool monsoon rainforest inhabited by a variety of birdlife. Spot kingfishers, honey-eaters, fairy-wrens and pigeons. Other wildlife may be seen along the way such as brown bandicoots and northern quolls. This walk is graded as difficult, and takes about two days.

=== Greenant Creek ===
This eight and a half kilometre walk, which forms part of the Tabletop Track in Litchfield National Park, takes you from Greenant Creek through to Wangi Falls. The creeks and springs around this region have a constant supply of water, thereby creating an abundance of flora and fauna. There are Carpentaria palms, fig trees and weeping paperbark trees, and, along the forest floor, spot geckos, lizards and frogs.

=== Wangi Falls Walk ===
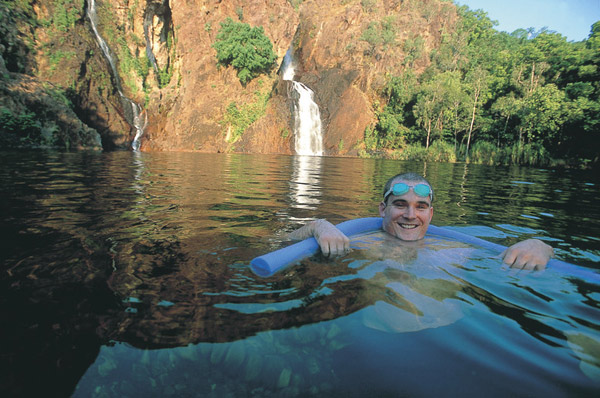
Wangi Falls

This two-day walk, part of the Tabletop Track, runs from Wangi Falls through to Walker Creek. This landscape with its rocky outcrops and ridges provides a haven for the local wildlife such as northern quolls, wallabies, frogs and lizards. There is abundant birdlife too – try spotting colourful red-winged parrots, double-barred finches, or kingfishers.

=== Walker Creek Walk ===
This final trek of the Tabletop Track in Litchfield National Park, will take you from Walker Creek to Florence Falls. Spot local wildlife including wallabies and possums, or listen to some of the curious bird calls from the variety of birdlife that also inhabit this forest area.

=== The Lost City ===
These freestanding sandstone blocks and pillar formations bring to mind the ruins of a long-forgotten civilisation. This is considered one of the best short walks in Litchfield National Park. Accessible by four-wheel drive only.

== Accommodation ==
There are several camping locations throughout Litchfield. Camping fees apply. Camping is permitted at:

- Wangi Falls
- Buley Rockhole
- Florence Falls
- Tjaynera Falls (Sandy Creek)
- Walker Creek
- Surprise Creek Falls
- Florence Falls (downstream)

Commercial accommodation options are available outside the park at:

- Litchfield Tourist & Van Park
- Wangi Tourist Park
- Banyan Tree Caravan Park
- Batchelor Resort Carravillage
- Batchelor Butterfly & Bird Farm
- Historic Retreat
- Rum Jungle Bungalows

== Administrative status ==
On 4 April 2007, the land occupied by the national park was gazetted by the Northern Territory Government as a locality with the name Litchfield Park. The 2016 Australian census which was conducted in August 2016 reports that Litchfield Park had 44 people living within its boundaries. The locality has not been added to any existing local government area and is considered to be part of the Northern Territory's unincorporated areas.

== See also ==
- Protected areas of the Northern Territory
