= Enigmaleo =

Enigmaleo Temporal range: Early Miocene

Scientific classification
- Kingdom: Animalia
- Phylum: Chordata
- Class: Mammalia
- Infraclass: Marsupialia
- Order: Diprotodontia
- Family: †Thylacoleonidae
- Genus: †Enigmaleo
- Species: †E. archeri

Binomial name
- †Enigmaleo archeri Gillespie, 2023

Extinct genus of marsupials

Enigmaleo is an extinct genus of carnivorous marsupial from northeast Australia. The genus contains a single species, E. archeri, known from an isolated premolar. It is the fourth thylacoleonid found from Early Miocene-aged deposits. This species is closely related to the diminutive Microleo.

== Discovery and naming ==
The holotype and only known specimen of Enigmaleo, QM F24549, was recovered from the Dirk’s Towers Site at the Riversleigh World Heritage Area, in the Boodjamulla National Park of north-western Queensland. It consists of an isolated upper third premolar.

In 2023, Anna K. Gillespie named and described Enigmaleo archeri as a new genus and species of thylacoleonid based on these fossil remains. The genus name is derived from the Greek word for "mysterious" (Enigma), a word specifically chosen to reference the lack of other information about this marsupial lion. The second part of the name is composed of the Latin word for "lion" (leo). The species name honours Michael Archer, for his contributions to Australian vertebrate palaeontology and leadership of the Riversleigh fossil project.

== Description ==
The holotype tooth is 5.7 millimetres (0.2 inches) long. It is similar to other thylacoleonids in that it is blade-like. The anterior and posterior cusps are broadly separated from each other but are connected by a V-shaped longitudinal blade. This blade has a relatively deep notch just in front of the posterior cusp and, unlike in Microleo, is lingually (the inner side, towards the tongue) bowed. The tooth's crown lacks buccal and lingual constriction just behind the anterior cusp. The anterior crest has a kink towards its middle, a feature not seen in species of Lekaneleo and Wakaleo. A small, concave longitudinal crest is present at the back of the tooth and is inclined at a moderate angle.

Enigmaleo is one of the smallest thylacoleonids, with an estimated weight of 1.05 kg (2.3 lbs).

== Classification ==
In their 2023 study, Anna K. Gillespie used a parsimony-based analysis to test the phylogenetic relationships of Enigmaleo within Thylacoleonidae. The analysis found it to be the sister taxon of the similarly-aged Microleo attenboroughi, with this clade forming the sister group to all other thylacoleonids. The results of their phylogenetic analyses are displayed in the cladogram below:

- Thylacoleonidae
  - - Microleo attenboroughi
    - Enigmaleo archeri
  - - Lekaneleo roskellyae
    - Lekaneleo myersi
    - - Wakaleo pitikantensis
      - - Wakaleo schouteni
        - Wakaleo oldfieldi
        - - Wakaleo vanderfeueri
          - Wakaleo alcootaensis
      - Thylacoleo
        - Thylacoleo hilli
        - - Thylacoleo crassidentatus
          - Thylacoleo carnifex

== Paleobiology ==
Enigmaleo is known from the Dirk's Tower Site within Faunal Zone B at the Riversleigh World Heritage Area. It was deposited during the Early Miocene, a time when Australia's climate was relatively warmer and wetter than it is today. The Riversleigh area would have been covered in closed rainforest habitat. Enigmaleo lived alongside other thylacoleonids like Microleo attenboroughi, Wakaleo schouteni and Lekaneleo roskellyae; and the thylacinids Badjcinus turnbulli, B. timfaulkneri, Ngamalacinus nigelmarveni and Nimbacinus peterbridgei. The two families of carnivorous marsupials likely did not compete with each other due to differences in body size and vertical habitat segregation. Enigmaleo is interpreted as being faunivorous, meaning it fed on both vertebrates and invertebrates.
