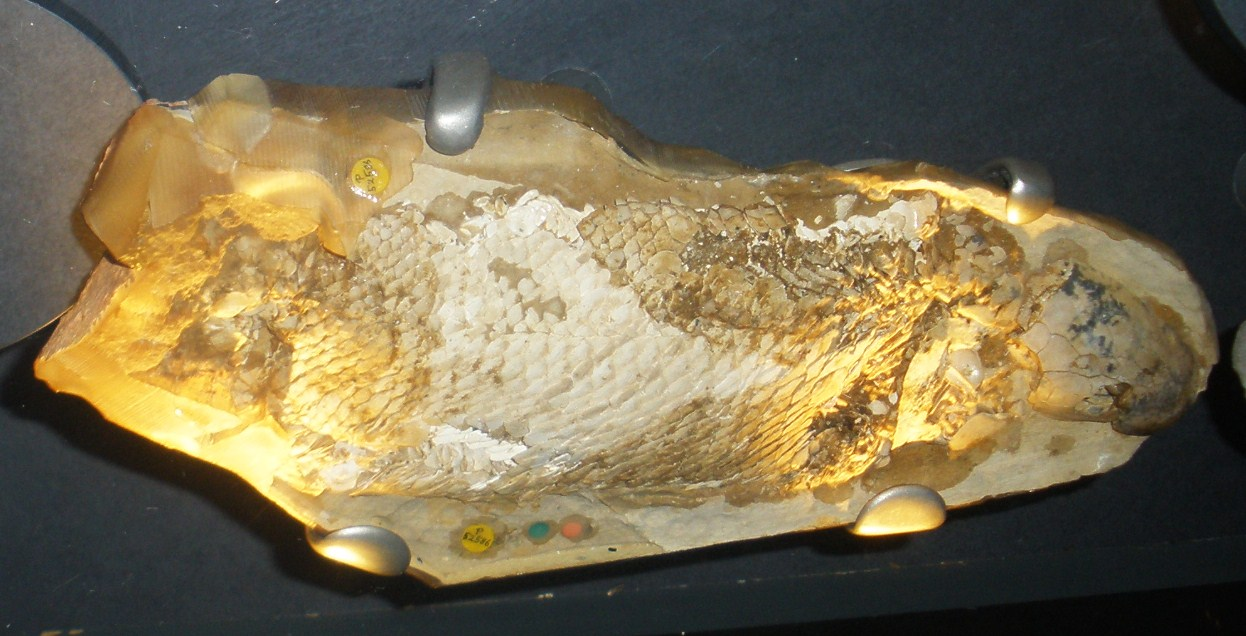
- Specimen of "C." australis

Scientific classification
- Kingdom: Animalia
- Phylum: Chordata
- Class: Dipnoi
- Family: †Chirodipteridae
- Genus: †Chirodipterus; Gross, 1933

Type species
- †Chirodipterus wildungensis Gross, 1933

Species
- See text

= Chirodipterus =

Chirodipterus Temporal range: Middle to Late Devonian

Extinct genus of fishes

Chirodipterus is an extinct genus of marine lungfish which lived during the Devonian period. Fossils have been found worldwide, including Germany, China, eastern & western Australia, and the United States (Michigan). However, it has been suggested that the genus as currently defined is polyphyletic, in which case only the German type species (C. wildungensis) would belong to the genus.

The following species are known:

- †'C.' australis Miles, 1977 - Frasnian of Western Australia (Gogo Formation)
- †'C.' liangchengi Song & Chang, 1991 - Late Devonian of Hunan, China
- †'C.' onawayensis Schultze, 1982 - Givetian of Michigan, USA (Traverse Group)
- †'C.' potteri Kemp, 2000 - Frasnian and Famennian of New South Wales, Australia
- †'C.' rhenanus Mors, 1991 - Givetian of the Rhenish Massif, Germany
- †C. wildungensis Gross, 1933 - Late Devonian of Wildungen, Germany

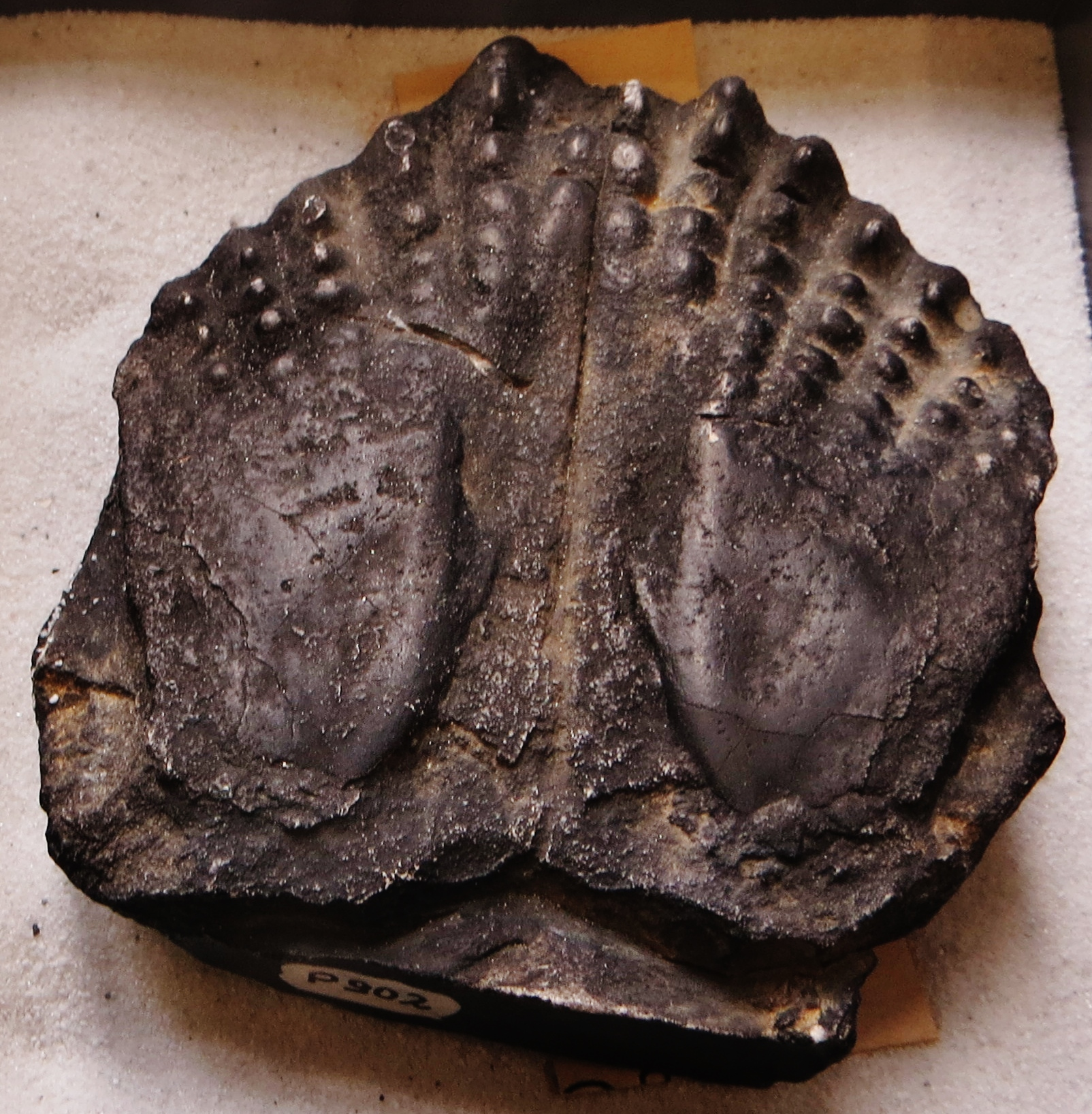
Tooth plate of 'C.' rhenanus

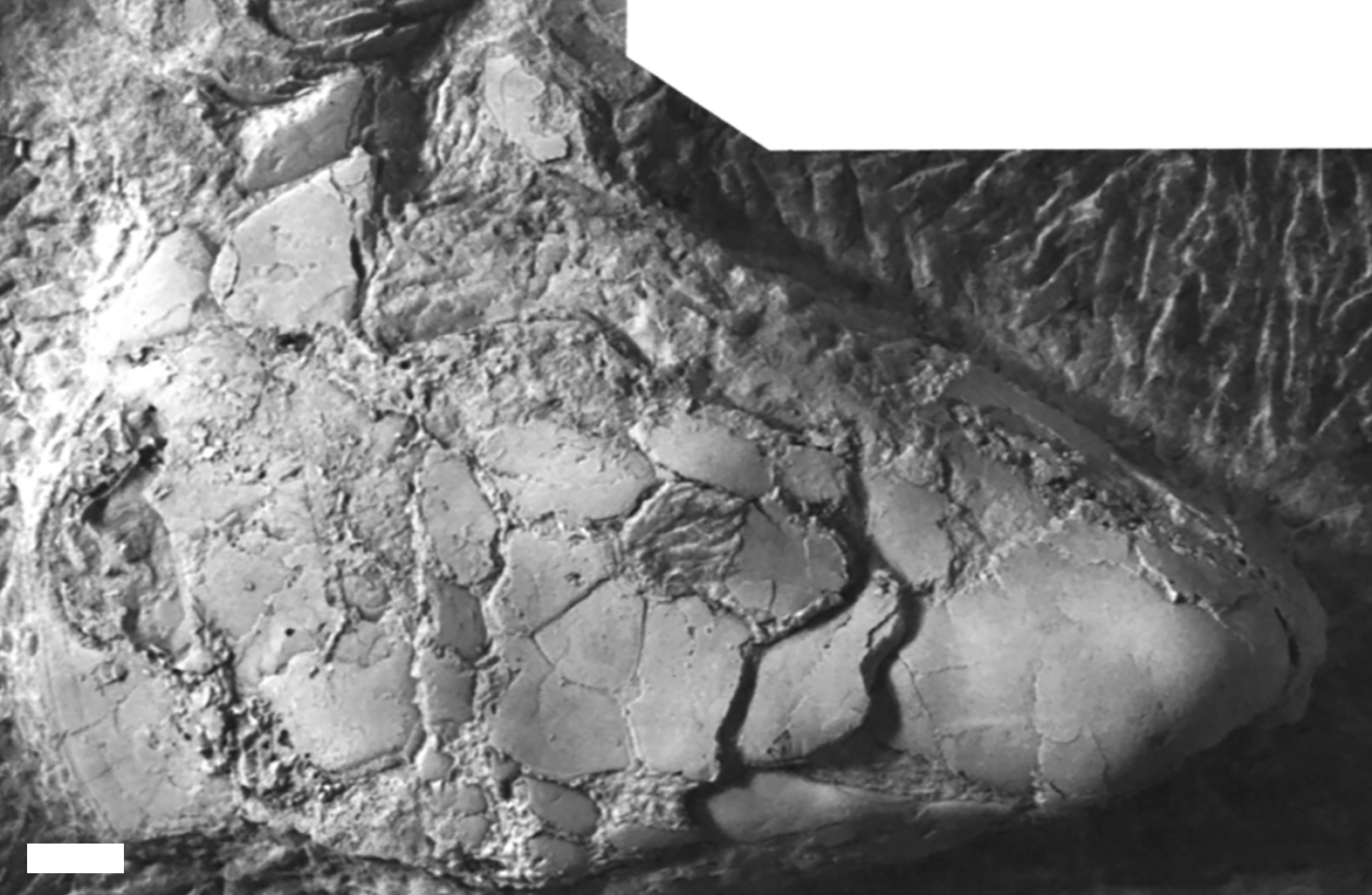
Fossil skull of 'C.' onawayensis

The former species C. paddyensis is now placed in the genus Gogodipterus. It has been suggested that the type species (C. wildungensis), is most closely related to Rhinodipterus, whereas 'C.' australis and 'C.' liangchengi are related to Pillararhynchus and Sorbitorhynchus.
