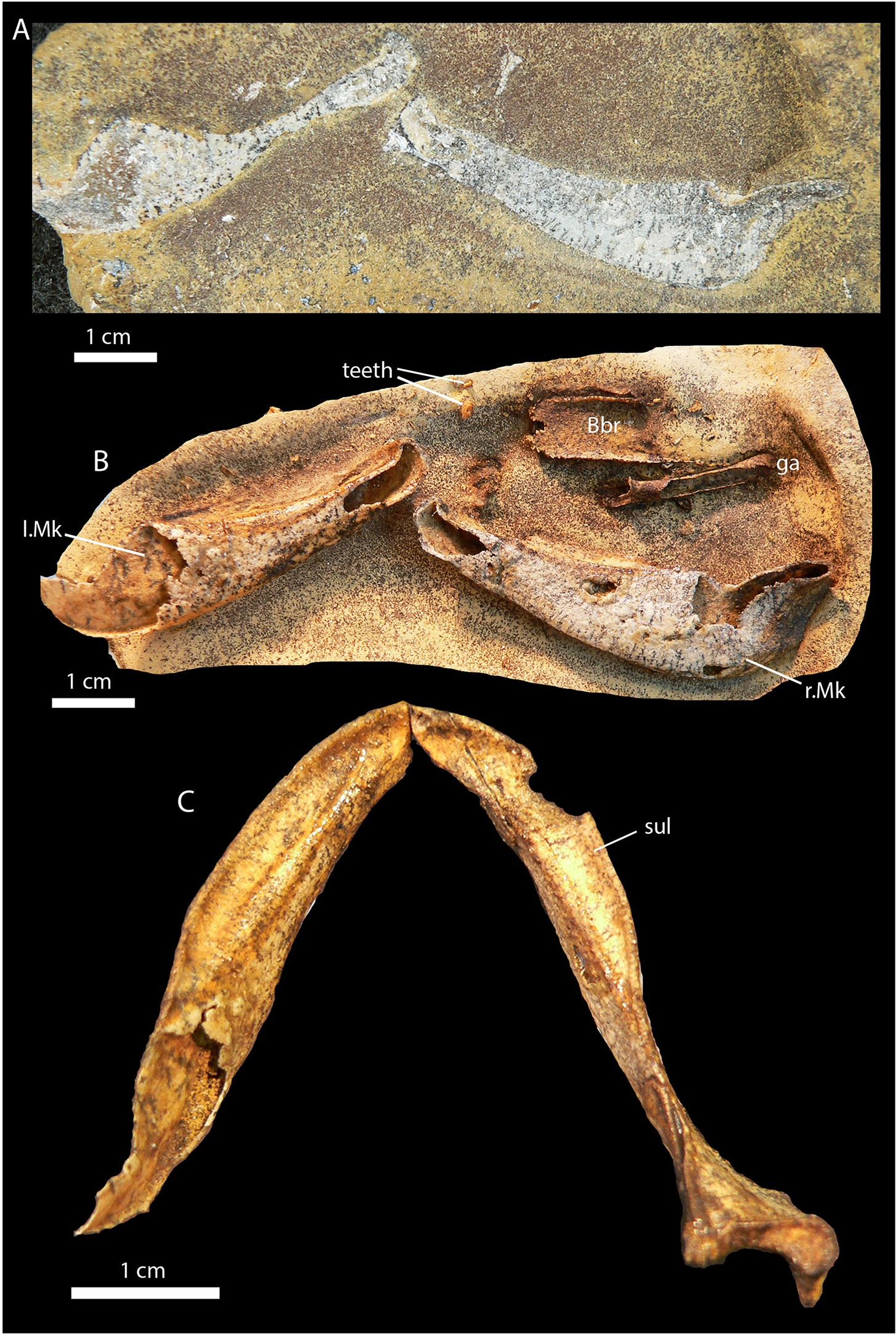
- Holotype (WAM 09.6.145)

Scientific classification
- Kingdom: Animalia
- Phylum: Chordata
- Class: Chondrichthyes
- Order: incertae sedis
- Family: incertae sedis
- Genus: †Gogoselachus
- Species: †G. lynbeazleyae

Binomial name
- †Gogoselachus lynbeazleyae Long, 2015

= Gogoselachus =

Gogoselachus Temporal range: Frasnian, 380–384 Ma

Extinct genus of cartilaginous fishes

Gogoselachus ("shark from the Gogo Formation") is an extinct genus of cartilaginous fish known from the late Devonian of Australia. It is one of the earliest well-preserved Devonian chondrichthyans (20 million years older than Cladoselache), as much more of the fish than just teeth and scales were preserved. This rare preservation reveals some unique discoveries about the evolution of the cartilage that was inside later cartilaginous fish such as sharks, rays, and chimaeras.

== Description ==
Gogoselachus was a diminutive shark-like fish that was a fast-swimming predator. It probably hunted other fish, such as placoderms and primitive bony fish. It had very unusual teeth, with large fangs surrounded by many small cusps; these jagged teeth were useful to snag its prey. Its scales resembled those of the spiny sharks, which were ancestral to all cartilaginous fish. Its mineralized, tesselated cartilage was highly unusual.

== Discovery ==
The remains of Gogoselachus were first discovered in 2005 by John A. Long in the Gogo Formation of Kimberly, making it the first known cartilaginous fish from the Gogo formation in over 60 years. The specimen was found inside a broken concretion, and was made up of the complete lower jaws, the shoulder blades, gill-arches, scales and teeth. During the specimen's preparation (dissolving the surrounding limestone with acetic acid), the cartilaginous elements were released surprisingly quickly, meaning that the fish's skeleton was made up of a special kind of mineralized cartilage.

== Significance ==
The cartilage of Gogoselachus was very different from those of other cartilaginous fish and acanthodians. While the cartilage itself closely resembled modern shark cartilage, the matrix holding the cartilage cells together contained remnant bone cells. This means that in contrast to the previous idea that cartilaginous fish were jawed vertebrates that evolved before the advent of a bony skeleton, cartilaginous fish in fact evolved from bony ancestors. Cartilaginous fish most likely lost these bony skeletons in order to evade predators and catch prey faster.
