= Gogo Formation =

Lagerstätte formation in the Kimberley, Western Australia

- Stratigraphic range: Middle-Late Devonian (Givetian to Frasnian), 384–382 Ma
- Type: Geological formation
- Unit of: Fairfield Group
- Underlies: Napier Formation, Virgin Hills Formation
- Overlies: Pillara Limestone, Sadler Limestone
- Thickness: Up to 700 m (2,300 ft)

Lithology
- Primary: Shale, Siltstone
- Other: Limestone

Location
- Location: Kimberley, Western Australia
- Coordinates: 18.3°S 126.5°E
- Approximate paleocoordinates: 16.7°S 136.7°E
- Region: Western Australia
- Country: Australia
- Extent: Canning Basin

Type section
- Named for: Gogo Station
- Thickness at type section: ~425 m (1,394 ft)
- Gogo Formation (Australia) Gogo Formation (Western Australia)

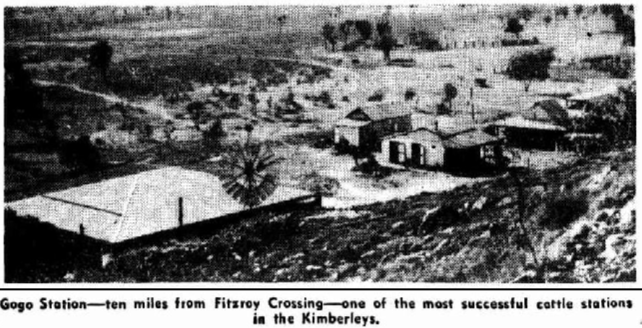
View of Gogo Station, 1951

The Gogo Formation in the Kimberley region of Western Australia is a Lagerstätte that exhibits exceptional preservation of a Devonian reef community. The formation is named after Gogo Station, a cattle station where outcrops appear and fossils are often collected from, as is nearby Fossil Downs Station.

== History ==
The reef, which now stands up abruptly in the western Australian desert (as the Windjana Limestone), was first identified in 1940 by paleontologist Curt Teichert, who discovered the first fossil fish from the region.

== Geology and deposition ==
The type section of the Gogo Formation is an approximately 430-meter-thick sequence of organic-rich, grey to black fine-grained shales and siltstones, interbedded with calcarenite and lenses of limestone. Horizons of resistant, silty calcareous concretions range from 3 to 50 centimeters in dimension (most commonly 5 to 20 cm). As the surrounding softer matrix eroded away, these weather-resistant concretions produce extensive nodule fields across the ground.

Deposition occurred between the middle Givetian (based on miospores) and early Frasnian (based on conodonts), dating the formation to approximately 384 to 382 million years ago.

The Gogo sediments represent deep, hypoxic seafloor deposits in the vicinity of a large tropical reef composed primarily of algae and stromatoporoids during the Frasnian faunal stage of the Late Devonian. Associated stratigraphic units which comprise this ancient reef system are the Windjana Formation (the actual reef structures), Pillara Limestone (reef platform) and the Sadler Formation (fore-reef deposits).

== Fossil preservation ==
The fossils of the Gogo Formation display three-dimensional soft-tissue preservation of tissues as fragile as nerves and embryos with umbilical cords. Over fifty species of fish have been described from the formation, and arthropods, including phyllocarids and eurypterids are similarly well-preserved. Nautiloids, goniatites and tentaculids are also known from the formation, but their soft tissue is not preserved. However, the most diverse group by far are the radiolarians, known from over 100 species split between 17 genera. The excellent preservation of a sheer number of species has allowed for the identification of a wide range of morphotypes, and clarified the structure of different skeletal elements, permitting better taxonomic resolution.

The calcareous concretions formed around objects from the shallow reef areas which sank into the deep anoxic basins. The concretions sometimes contain the remains of fish, whose bodies are often preserved complete in three-dimensions due to rapid encasement and the slow rate of decay in the oxygen-poor surroundings. By repeated baths in a dilute acid solution, the matrix is dissolved away via a process of acid etching to reveal delicate fish fossils, some retaining impressions of soft tissues.

The discovery of Materpiscis, a placoderm preserved with an embryonic juvenile still attached by its umbilical cord, has revealed that at least some placoderms gave birth to live young.

== Fossil content ==
Actinopterygians of the Gogo Formation
Genus	Species	Clade	Images
Gogosardina	G. coatesi	Actinopterygii incertae sedis	
Mimipiscis	M. toombsi	Actinopterygii incertae sedis	
Mimipiscis	M. bartrami	Actinopterygii incertae sedis	
Moythomasia	M. durgaringa	Actinopterygii, Moythomasiidae	
Pickeringius	P. acanthophorus	Actinopterygii incertae sedis	

Ammonoids of the Gogo Formation
Genus	Species	Clade	Images
Hoeninghausia	H. pons	Goniatitida, Gephuroceratidae	
Ponticeras	P. discoidale	Goniatitida, Gephuroceratidae	
Probeloceras	P. lutheri holzapfeli	Agoniatitida, Acanthoclymeniidae	
Timanites	T. angustus	Agoniatitida, Koenentidae	
Tornoceras	T. (T.) simplex	Goniatitida, Tornoceratidae	

Arthropods of the Gogo Formation
Genus	Species	Clade	Images
Montecaris	M. gogoensis	Archaeostraca, Echinocarididae	
Montecaris	M. sp. indet.	Archaeostraca, Echinocarididae	
Schugurocaris	S. wami	Archaeostraca, Ceratiocarididae	
Schugurocaris	S. sp. indet.	Archaeostraca, Ceratiocarididae	
Dithyrocaris	D. sp. indet.	Archaeostraca, Rhinocarididae	
Concavicaris	C. campi	Thylacocephala (Concavicarida incertae sedis)	
Concavicaris	C. glenisteri	Thylacocephala (Concavicarida incertae sedis)	
Concavicaris	C. milesi	Thylacocephala (Concavicarida incertae sedis)	
Concavicaris	C. playfordi	Thylacocephala (Concavicarida incertae sedis)	
Concavicaris	C. sp.	Thylacocephala (Concavicarida incertae sedis)	
Harrycaris	H. whittingtoni	Thylacocephala (Concavicarida incertae sedis)	
Adelophthalmus	A. waterstoni	Eurypterida, Adelophthalmidae	
Undescribed eurypterid	sp. indet.	Eurypterida incertae sedis	
'Mushia'	sp. indet.	Crustacea? incertae sedis	

Chondrichthyans of the Gogo Formation
Genus	Species	Clade	Images
Gogoselachus	G. lynbeazleyae	Chondrichthyes incertae sedis	
Halimacanthodes	H. ahlbergi	Acanthodiformes, Howittacanthidae	

Conodonts of the Gogo Formation
Genus	Species	Clade	Images
Polygnathus	P. varca	Ozarkodinida, Polygnathidae	
Polygnathus	P. normalis	Ozarkodinida, Polygnathidae	
Polygnathus	P. asymmetrica asymmetrica	Ozarkodinida, Polygnathidae	
Polygnathus	P. asymmetrica ovalis	Ozarkodinida, Polygnathidae	
Playfordia	P. primitiva	Prioniodontida, Playfordiidae	
Gnamptognathus	G.? lipperti	Uncertain	
Gnamptognathus	G.? cf. G.? lipperti	Uncertain	
Ancyrodella	A. rotundiloba alata	Ozarkodinida, Polygnathidae	
Ancyrodella	A. rotundiloba rotundiloba	Ozarkodinida, Polygnathidae	
Icirodus	I. symmetricus	Uncertain	
Roundya	A. aurita	Uncertain	

Placoderms of the Gogo Formation
Genus	Species	Clade	Images
Austroptyctodus	A. gardinieri	Ptyctodontida, Ptyctodontidae	
Bothriolepis	Indeterminate	Antiarchi, Bothriolepididae	
Bruntonichthys	B. multidens	Arthrodira, Aspinothoracidi incertae sedis)	
Bullerichthys	B. fascidens	Arthrodira, Aspinothoracidi incertae sedis)	
Campbellodus	C. decipiens	Ptyctodontida, Ptyctodontidae	
Camuropiscis	C. concinnus	Arthrodira, Camuropiscidae	
Camuropiscis	C. laidlawi	Arthrodira, Camuropiscidae	
Compagopiscis	C. croucheri	Arthrodira, Incisoscutoidea incertae sedis	
Eastmanosteus	E. calliaspis	Arthrodira, Dunkleosteidae	
Fallacosteus	F. turneri	Arthrodira, Camuropiscidae	
Harrytoombsia	H. elegans	Arthrodira, Incisoscutoidea incertae sedis	
Holonema	H. westolli	Arthrodira, Holonematidae	
Incisoscutum	I. ritchei	Arthrodira, Incisoscutidae	
Incisoscutum	I. sarahae	Arthrodira, Incisoscutidae	
Kendrickichthys	K. cavernosus	Arthrodira (Aspinothoracidi incertae sedis)	
Kimberleyichthys	K. bispicatus	Arthrodira (Eubrachythoraci incertae sedis)	
Kimberleyichthys	K. whybrowi	Arthrodira (Eubrachythoraci incertae sedis)	
Materpiscis	M. attenboroughi	Ptyctodontida, Ptyctodontidae	
Latocamurus	L. coulthardi	Arthrodira, Camuropiscidae	
Mcnamaraspis	M. kaprios	Arthrodira, Incisoscutoidea incertae sedis	
Pinguosteus	P. thulborni	Arthrodira, Coccosteina incertae sedis	
Rolfosteus	R. canningensis	Arthrodira, Camuropiscidae	
Simosteus	S. tuberculatus	Arthrodira, Camuropiscidae	
Torosteus	T. tuberculatus	Arthrodira, Incisoscutoidea incertae sedis	
Torosteus	T. pulchellus	Arthrodira, Incisoscutoidea incertae sedis	
Tubonasus	T. lennardensis	Arthrodira, Camuropiscidae	

Sarcopterygians of the Gogo Formation
Genus	Species	Clade	Images
Adololopas	A. moyasmithae	Speonesidrionina, incertae sedis	
Asthenorhynchus	A. meemanae	Dipnoi, Holodontidae	
Cainocara	C. enigma	Dipnoi, incertae sedis	
Chirodipterus	C. australis	Dipnoi, Chirodipteridae	
Ngamugawi	N. wirngarri	Coelacanthiformes, incertae sedis	
Gogodipterus	G. paddyensis	Dipnoi, Chirodipteridae	
Gogonasus	G. andrewsae	Osteolepiformes, Osteolepididae	
Griphognathus	G. whitei	Dipnoi, Holodontidae	
Holodipterus	"H" (Holodipteroides) elderae	Dipnoi, Holodontidae	
Holodipterus	H. gogoensis	Dipnoi, Holodontidae	
Onychodus	O. jandemarrai	Onychodontiformes, Onychodontidae	
Pillararhynchus	P. longi	Dipnoi, Chirodipteridae	
Rhinodipterus	R. kimberleyensis	Dipnoi, incertae sedis	
Robinsondipterus	R. longi	Dipnoi, Holodontidae	
Xeradipterus	X. hatcheri	Dipnoi, Holodontidae	
