= Feathered Dinosaurs: The Origin of Birds =

2008 book by John A. Long and Peter Schouten

- Author: John A. Long; Peter Schouten
- Language: English
- Genre: Reference encyclopedia
- Publisher: CSIRO Press; Oxford University Press
- Publication date: 2008
- Pages: 194 or 208
- ISBN: 978-0-643-09434-5

Feathered Dinosaurs: The Origin of Birds is a book by Australian palaeontologist John A. Long and Peter Schouten connecting feathered dinosaurs with the origin of birds. It was published in 2008 by CSIRO Press (Melbourne) and Oxford University Press. From the ISBN numbers, they appear to be separate printings.

There is a previous, different, book with the same title. It is by Thom and Laurie Holmes, and published by Enslow in 2002, ISBN 0-7660-1454-1.
