= Gogodipterus =

Gogodipterus Temporal range: Early Frasnian

Scientific classification
- Kingdom: Animalia
- Phylum: Chordata
- Class: Dipnoi
- Family: †Chirodipteridae
- Genus: †Gogodipterus; Long, 1992
- Species: †G. paddyensis

Binomial name
- †Gogodipterus paddyensis (Miles, 1977)

Synonyms
- Chirodipterus paddyensis Miles, 1977

Extinct genus of fishes

Gogodipterus is an extinct genus of prehistoric marine lungfish in the family Chirodipteridae. It contains a single species, G. paddyensis, known from the Late Devonian Gogo Formation of Western Australia. It was formerly placed in Chirodipterus.

== See also ==
- Sarcopterygii
