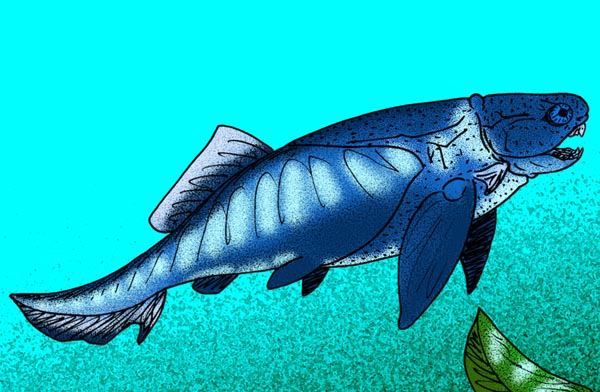
- Artist's reconstruction

Scientific classification
- Kingdom: Animalia
- Phylum: Chordata
- Class: †Placodermi
- Order: †Arthrodira
- Suborder: †Brachythoraci
- Infraorder: †Coccosteina
- Genus: †Pinguosteus; Long, 1990

Type species
- Pinguosteus thulborni Long, 1990

= Pinguosteus =

Pinguosteus Temporal range: Frasnian

Extinct genus of fishes

Pinguosteus thulborni is a species of arthrodire placoderm from the Gogo Reef Formation, of Late Devonian Australia. The proportions of its armor, coupled with the relative lack of otherwise diagnostic ornamentation on the armor make its classification difficult, and so it was placed as incertae sedis within the placoderm group Coccosteina. It is the only known species of the genus Pinguosteus.

== Etymology ==
The generic name is a compound of the Latin words pinguis, meaning "fat," and os, meaning "bone," in allusion to the broad proportions of its armor plates. The specific name commemorates Dr. Tony Thulborn.
