= Xeradipterus =

Xeradipterus Temporal range: Frasnian

Scientific classification
- Kingdom: Animalia
- Phylum: Chordata
- Class: Dipnoi
- Family: †Holodontidae
- Genus: †Xeradipterus; Clement & Long, 2010

Type species
- †Xeradipterus hatcheri Clement & Long, 2010

Extinct genus of fishes

Xeradipterus is an extinct genus of lungfish which existed in Australia during the Frasnian period. Of moderate size (45–60 centimetres or 18–24 inches), it is believed to be a primitive member of the family Holodontidae characterized by its powerful crushing dentition with thick heels on the lower jaw tooth plates. The type and only specimen was found in the Gogo Formation by Lindsay Hatcher on an expedition to Gogo led by John A. Long on behalf of Museum Victoria in 2005.
