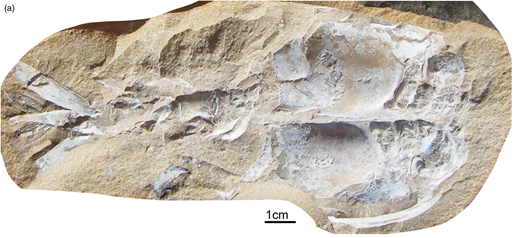
- Montecaris gogoensis

Scientific classification
- Kingdom: Animalia
- Phylum: Arthropoda
- Clade: Pancrustacea
- Class: Malacostraca
- Order: †Archaeostraca
- Family: †Echinocarididae
- Subfamily: †Montecaridinae
- Genus: †Montecaris; Ulrich Jux, 1959

Type species
- Montecaris strunensis Jux, 1959

= Montecaris =

Montecaris Temporal range: Frasnian-Famennian 382–359 Ma

Extinct genus of crustaceans

Montecaris is a genus of extinct phyllocarid crustaceans found in the Upper Devonian of Europe, Canada, and Australia.

== Description ==
Montecaris possesses an unornamented, bivalved carapace which terminates in a spiny posterior. Its caudal tail fin is trifurcated and dagger-like. Species of Montecaris from Europe and Canada are no more than 15 cm (5.9 in) in length, while M. gogoensis from the Gogo Formation of Australia can reach lengths of 24 cm (9.4 in) and, rarely, up to 60 cm (2.0 ft).

Due to its streamlined carapace and large tail fin, Montecaris was likely an active nektonic swimmer, which primarily appears in deep water sediments. Its robust mandibles and powerful musculature suggests a carnivorous lifestyle as an active predator or scavenger.

== Species ==
- M. antecedens Chlupač, 1960
- M. brunnensis Chlupač, 1960
- M. gogoensis Briggs, 2011
- M. lehmanni Jux, 1960 (Possibly synonymous with M. strunensis)
- M. strunensis Jux, 1959
- M. tatarica Krestovnikov, 1961
