= Lekaneleo =

Lekaneleo Temporal range: Late Oligocene-Early Miocene ~25–16 Ma

Scientific classification
- Kingdom: Animalia
- Phylum: Chordata
- Class: Mammalia
- Infraclass: Marsupialia
- Order: Diprotodontia
- Family: †Thylacoleonidae
- Genus: †Lekaneleo; Gillespie, Archer & Hand, 2020

Type species
- †Lekaneleo roskellyae Gillespie, 1997

Other species
- †L. myersi Gillespie, 2023

Synonyms
- Priscileo roskellyae Gillespie, 1997

Extinct species of marsupial

Lekaneleo is a fossil genus of carnivorous marsupial that existed during the early Miocene in Australia. Once allied to the type species of the genus Priscileo, later placed as Wakaleo pitikantensis, "Priscileo" roskellyae was subsequently transferred to its own genus Lekaneleo.

== Taxonomy ==
The species was described by Anna Gillespie in 1997, describing material excavated at the Riversleigh World Heritage Area that included a largely complete cranium and maxillary retaining some teeth and details of the alveoli. Examination of the new species included a revision of the previously monotypic genus, Priscileo, known only by fragmented remains of teeth and a partial maxilla. The discovery of a new species of Riversleigh fauna allowed the genus to be revised (Gillespie, et al, 2017) to include the type to be recognised in the new combination as Wakaleo pitikantensis. Subsequently Gillespie, Archer & Hand (2020) moved "Priscileo" roskellyae to a distinct genus Lekaneleo, arguing that it exhibits features supporting its generic distinction within Thylacoleonidae. The specific epithet honours Ros Kelly, who provided support to research at Riversleigh when acting as a minister of the federal government.

== Description ==
As one of two described species of Priscileo, it is estimated to have been around two thirds the size of Priscileo pitikantensis; the body mass of L. roskellyae is calculated as 2.7 kilograms (6.0 lb). The upper dental formula of this marsupial was I1–3 C1 P1–13 M 1–4. The premolar P3 is similar in form to the larger tooth in species of Wakaleo, the mid-sized thylacoleonids that also existed at Riversleigh and seemed to occupy different ecological niches in the same time period.

The comparative bite force of the species, along with the larger Thylacoleo carnifex, is estimated to have been the greatest of any known mammal and strongly supports the conception of predators that killed animals larger than itself. The conception of the larger species 'P. pitikantensis, based on extrapolations from the limb morphology, is proposed to have been an arboreal ambush predator.
