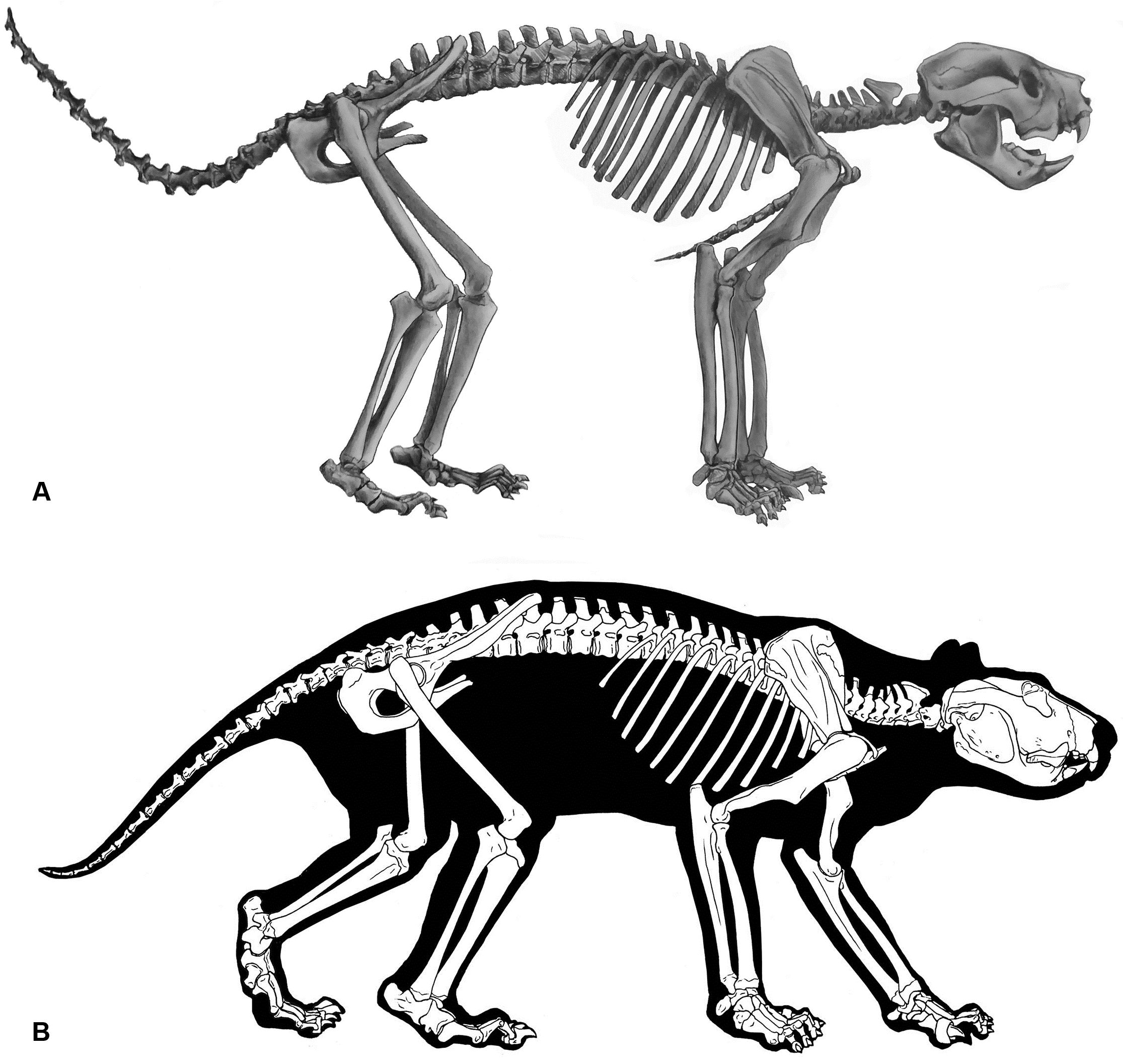
- Thylacoleo

Scientific classification
- Kingdom: Animalia
- Phylum: Chordata
- Class: Mammalia
- Infraclass: Marsupialia
- Order: Diprotodontia
- Suborder: Vombatiformes
- Family: †Thylacoleonidae; Gill, 1872

Genera
- Enigmaleo; Lekaneleo; Microleo; Thylacoleo; Wakaleo

= Thylacoleonidae =

Thylacoleonidae Temporal range: Late Oligocene–Late Pleistocene

Extinct family of marsupials

Thylacoleonidae is a family of extinct carnivorous diprotodontian marsupials from Australia, referred to as marsupial lions. The best known is Thylacoleo carnifex, also called the marsupial lion. The clade ranged from the Late Oligocene to the Late Pleistocene, with some earlier species the size of a possum, while the youngest members of the family belonging to the genus Thylacoleo reached sizes comparable to living big cats.

== Description ==
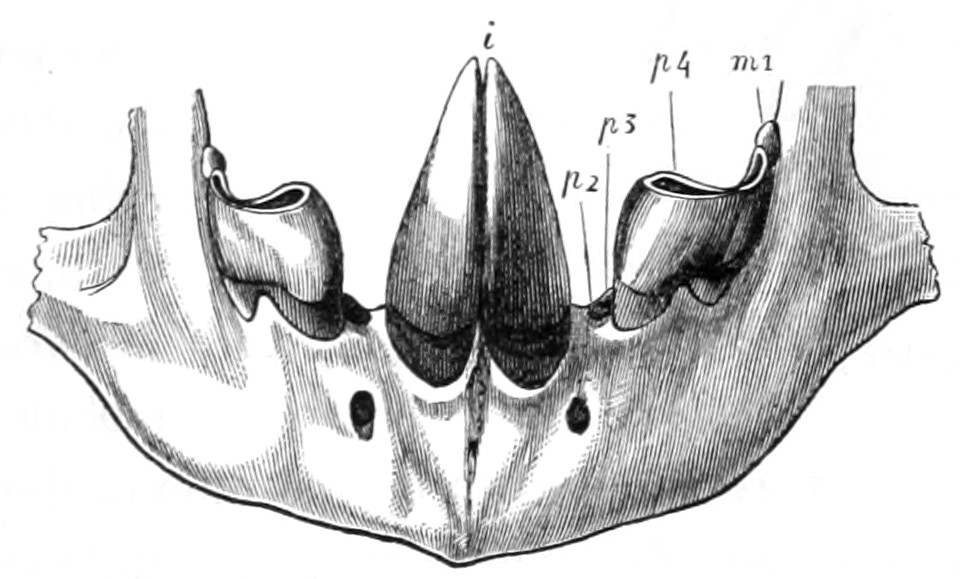
Illustration of lower dentition of Thylacoleo reconstructed by Owen, 1877

A notable distinctive feature of thylacoleonids is their unusual blade-like third premolars, which functioned as the carnassial teeth. Thylacoleonids varied widely in body size. One of the smallest thylacoleonids, the Early Miocene Microleo attenboroughi, is estimated to have had a body mass of 590 grams (1.30 lb), while the last species of the family, the Pleistocene Thylacoleo carnifex is suggested to have had a body mass of around 160 kilograms (350 lb), comparable to a big cat. Later members of the group saw progressive reduction in the number of teeth in the jaws.

== Ecology ==
Early members of Thylacoleonidae like Microleo, Lekaneleo and early species of Wakaleo were likely arboreal tree climbing mammals, though later members of Wakaleo and Thylacoleo were likely primarily terrestrial with some climbing capabilities. Some early species of Thylacoleonidae like Lekaneleo roskellyae are suggested to have been omnivorous, with others like Microleo were likely carnivorous, feeding on small vertebrates and (to a probably small extent) insects. Species of Wakaleo and Thylacoleo are thought to have been hypercarnivores that fed on larger prey.

== Taxonomy ==
Thylacoleontidae is considered a member of Diprotodontia, though its precise position within that group is uncertain. They have often been considered a basal group (often the most basal group) within Vombatiformes, making their closest living relatives wombats and koalas, though other authors have placed them at the base of Diprotodontia, outside of either Vombatiformes, Phalangeriformes or Macropodiformes. Analysis of the collagen sequences of Thyacoleo support a placement in the Vombatiformes. Thylacoleonids are thought to have evolved from herbivorous ancestors.

The family was described by Theodore Gill in a systematic revision of mammalian taxa published by the Smithsonian Institution in 1872. The name is derived from the genus named by Richard Owen, Thylacoleo, which he recognised as a potent carnivore and described as marsupial version of the modern lions (Leo).

A revision of the family was published in 2017, enabled by the discovery of a skull of an early species, named as Wakaleo schouteni, which allowed closer comparison with previously described species and the more complete fossil record of the lineages. The study by Anna Gillespie, Mike Archer and Suzanne Hand, revised the description of Wakaleo to include a new species and circumscribe taxa previously assigned to Priscileo.

=== Classification ===
Five genera are currently accepted as belonging to this family:

- Genus Enigmaleo
  - Enigmaleo archeri (Early Miocene)
- Genus Lekaneleo
  - Lekaneleo myersi (Middle Miocene)
  - Lekaneleo roskellyae (Early Miocene)
- Genus Microleo
  - Microleo attenboroughi (Early Miocene)
- Subfamily Thylacoleoninae
  - Genus Thylacoleo
    - Thylacoleo crassidentatus (Pliocene)
    - Thylacoleo hilli (Pliocene)
    - Thylacoleo carnifex (Pleistocene)
- Subfamily Wakaleoninae
  - Genus Wakaleo
    - Wakaleo pitikantensis (Late Oligocene)
    - Wakaleo schouteni (Late Oligocene—Early Miocene)
    - Wakaleo oldfieldi (Early Miocene—Late Miocene)
    - Wakaleo vanderleuri (Middle Miocene—Late Miocene)
    - Wakaleo alcootaensis (Late Miocene)

Cladogram after Gillespie (2023):

- Thylacoleonidae
  - - Microleo attenboroughi
    - Enigmaleo archeri
  - - Lekaneleo roskellyae
    - Lekaneleo myersi
    - - Wakaleo pitikantensis
      - - Wakaleo schouteni
        - Wakaleo oldfieldi
        - - Wakaleo vanderfeueri
          - Wakaleo alcootaensis
      - Thylacoleo
        - Thylacoleo hilli
        - - Thylacoleo crassidentatus
          - Thylacoleo carnifex
