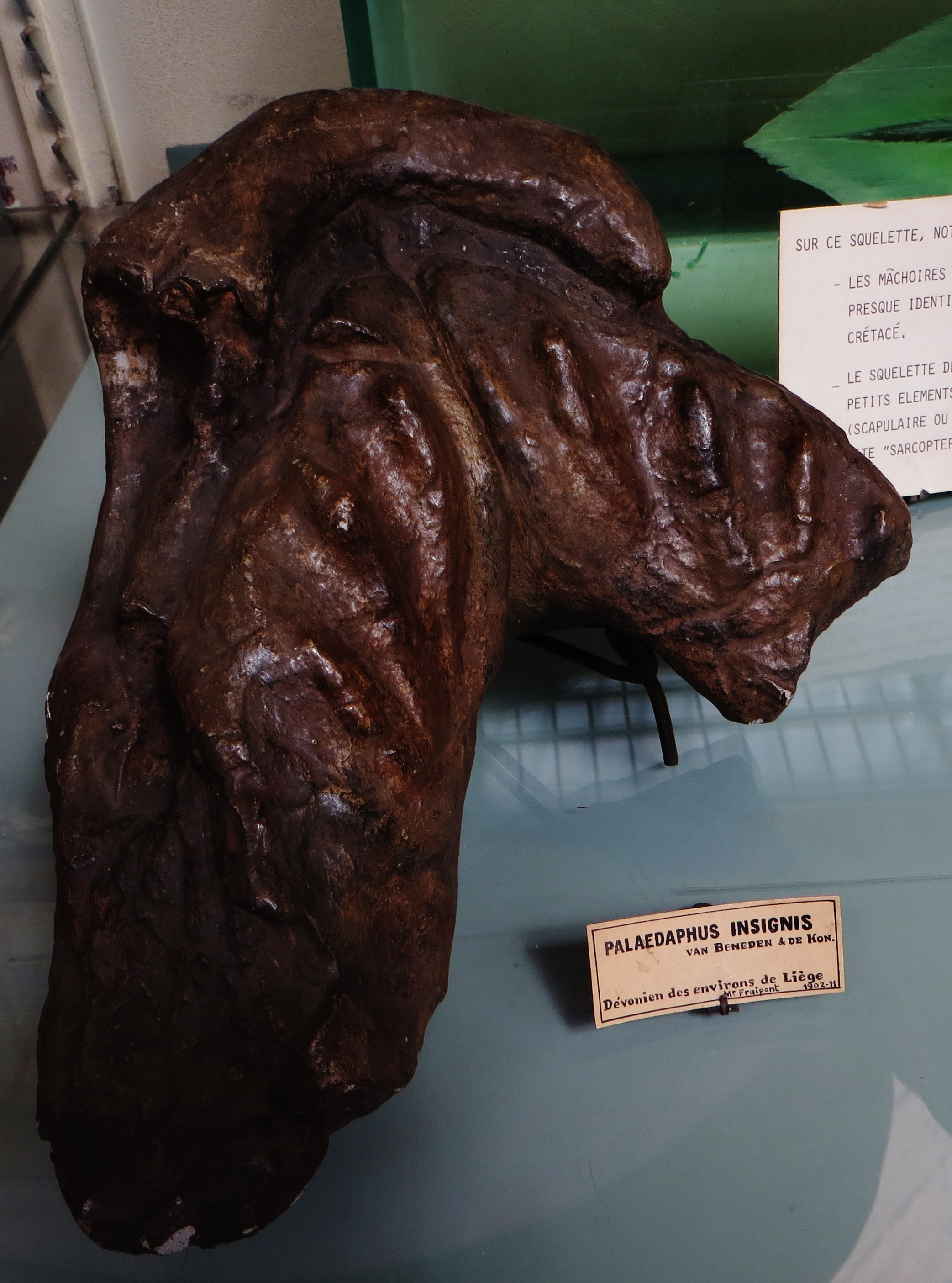

Scientific classification
- Domain: Eukaryota
- Kingdom: Animalia
- Phylum: Chordata
- Clade: Sarcopterygii
- Class: Dipnoi
- Family: †Chirodipteridae
- Genus: †Palaedaphus; Beneden & Koninck, 1864

= Palaedaphus =

Extinct genus of fishes

Palaedaphus is an extinct genus of prehistoric lungfish.

== See also ==
- Prehistoric fish
- List of prehistoric bony fish
