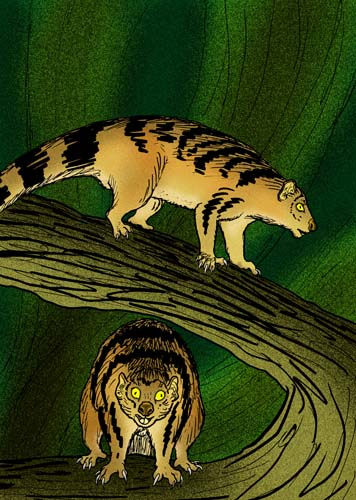

Scientific classification
- Kingdom: Animalia
- Phylum: Chordata
- Class: Mammalia
- Infraclass: Marsupialia
- Order: Diprotodontia
- Family: †Thylacoleonidae
- Genus: †Microleo
- Species: †M. attenboroughi

Binomial name
- †Microleo attenboroughi Gillespie, Archer, Hand 2016

= Microleo =

Microleo Temporal range: 18 Ma

Extinct genus of marsupials

Microleo attenboroughi is a very small species of the Thylacoleonidae family of marsupials from the Early Miocene of Australia, living in the wet forest that dominated Riversleigh around 18 million years ago. The genus Microleo, from Ancient Greek μικρός (mikrós), meaning "small", and λέων (léōn), meaning "lion", is currently known from a broken palate and two pieces of jaw, containing some teeth and roots that correspond to those found in other species of thylacoleonids. The shape and structure of the blade-like P3 tooth, a premolar, distinguished the species as a new genus. It was found in Early Miocene-aged deposits of the Riversleigh fossil site in Queensland, regarded as one of the most significant palaeontological sites yet discovered, and named for the naturalist David Attenborough in appreciation of his support for its heritage listing. The anatomy of Microleo suggests the genus is basal to all the known thylacoleonids, known as the marsupial lions, although its relatively small size prompted one discoverer to describe it as the "feisty" kitten of the family.

== Taxonomy ==
The description of a new species and genus was published in 2016. The type is currently the only known species of Microleo, a genus allied with the family Thylacoleonidae, and viewed as basal to the group. The thylacoleonids are represented in the later fossil records of Australia, powerful predatory marsupial species that existed throughout the Miocene to the Pleistocene.

The arrangement of the monotypic genus within the family may be summarised as:

- Family Thylacoleonidae (extinct)

- Genus Microleo

- Microleo attenboroughi

- Genus Wakaleo
- Genus Thylacoleo

The specific epithet attenboroughi commemorates the enthusiasm and support provided by David Attenborough, a well known broadcaster of natural history, that increased the recognition of the species type location, the Riversleigh World Heritage Area, a fossil site he described as one of the four most important. The genus name combines micro, Ancient Greek for small, and leo, Latin for lion, to describe the tiny size of the new marsupial as a "small lion".

The cranial features of the specimen, while largely incomplete, lead the authors of the description to propose a reassessment of the placement of the family Thylacoleonidae, but conserve its previously recognised alliance within the vombatomorphian clade.

== Description ==
A very small and probably arboreal species of thylacoleonid that existed during the Early Miocene at Riversleigh. The species was considered to be tiny, when compared with the previously known thylacoleonid weight range of 2 to 130 kilograms, and described as being similar in size to a ring-tailed possum (Pseudocheirus species). The carnivorous animal lived in a period around 18 million years ago in the wet forested environment, preying on a rich variety of the fauna that was present in the same period.

The type specimen is an incomplete palate that revealed the dentition associated with the family, the knife-edged bicuspid P3 tooth and molars that were adapted to killing and consuming animals, The material examined also included a lower molar. The morphology of the premolar deduced from the impression at the palate was proposed to separate the sister taxon as separate and previously unknown genus. The holotype material is composed of the partial remains of the left maxillary, still set with the direct evidence of the second and third molar (M2–M3), roots for third premolar (P3) to M1, the impression of the alveoli at M4, and the root at the arch of the cheek. A partial right maxillary is also described, preserved inset with P3–M2 and revealing the alveoli for M1 and P1–2. Another specimen, the left M3, was included as a paratype for the original description of Microleo attenboroughi.

The weight of M. attenboroughi is estimated to have been around 600 grams (21 oz), the smallest of the family, but a larger predator amongst the contemporary vertebrate fauna of the earlier Miocene. The premolars of the species are sharpened and elongated, these pointed and knife edge teeth and basin like molars are characteristic of the family.

When describing the new species for a press release, the palaeontologist and leading author Anna Gillespie was quoted as saying, "Microleo attenboroughi would have been more like the cute but still feisty kitten of the family Thylacoleonidae."

== Distribution ==
Known from the site within the Riversleigh formations identified as "Neville's Garden Site", a deposit rich in other fossil species. Studies of this site have produced a radiometric date range to the time of deposition as around eighteen million years before present (18.24±0.29 Ma and 17.85±0.13 Ma). The Riversleigh fossil area is a small region in the northeast of the Australian continent. The specimen was excavated and revealed from what was a pool of water at the time of deposition, one of many formed in the regions limestone formations, in a forest with very high rainfall and mild climate. The climate and ecology of the region, now an arid open woodland and grass dominated habitat, was comparable to the rainforests of modern Borneo. The Riversleigh fauna contains other species of thylacoleonid genera, two larger predators that inhabited the area at the same time. These related predators may have competed with M. attenbouroughi for similar prey, but the smaller size of the animal probably allowed access to higher parts of the forest canopy. The species was likely to have hunted for the variety of insects, birds and lizards that occupied the upper storey of its habitat, while remaining out of reach of larger predators that included relations like the Wakaleo species.

== See also ==
- List of things named after David Attenborough and his works
