= Kimberleyichthys =

Kimberleyichthys Temporal range: Late Devonian (Frasnian)

Scientific classification
- Kingdom: Animalia
- Phylum: Chordata
- Class: †Placodermi
- Order: †Arthrodira
- Suborder: †Brachythoraci
- Clade: †Eubrachythoraci
- Genus: †Kimberleyichthys; Dennis-Bryan & Miles, 1983

Species
- Kimberleyichthys whybrowni Dennis-Bryan & Miles, 1983 (type); Kimberleyichthys bispicatus Dennis & Miles, 1983

Genus of extinct fish

Kimberleyichthys is a genus of arthrodire which lived in what is now the Kimberley region (after which it is named) of Western Australia during the Lower Frasnian stage of the Devonian period. The fossils of both K. whybrowni, the type species, and K. bispicatus were both discovered in the Frasnian rocks of the Gogo Formation, and were described in 1983. It was originally described as Kimberia, but the authors were informed by Neville Pledge, then Curator of Fossils at the South Australian Museum, that the name was preoccupied by the gastropod Turritella (Kimberia) kimberi, and so issued a corrigendum in the same year to rename the genus to Kimberleyichthys, which now serves as the current genus name. However, the two species were provisionally made, as the material is not adequate for a solid judgement to be made. It is quite possible that K. bispicatus, the secondary species, belongs to a different genus.

Although the animal shares characteristics with another Gogo placoderm, Harrytoombsia, as they both possess square and broad heads, have unspecialized snouts, and have superognathals with shearing edges, as opposed to the crushing surfaces seen in other Gogo placoderms such as Bruntonichthys, Bullerichthys and Kendrickichthys, these are deemed basal characteristics, likely derived from an ancestral placoderm, and thus these findings alone were not used to determine the taxonomy of Kimberleyichthys beyond Eubrachythoraci. Later in the 1990s, it was classified as a plourodosteid alongside Mcnamaraspis, Torosteus, Harrytoombsia, Panxiosteus, Janiosteus and Plourdosteus itself. However, later in the 2000s, Kimberleyichthys was later reclassified as Eubrachythoraci incertae sedis.

Kimberleyichthys species were large, broad-snouted arthrodires with moderately sized eyes. The thickenings on the underside of the skull-roof are well developed, and the head shield is shorter than it is broad.
