= Sorbitorhynchus =

Sorbitorhynchus Temporal range: Early Devonian

Scientific classification
- Kingdom: Animalia
- Phylum: Chordata
- Class: Dipnoi
- Family: †Chirodipteridae
- Genus: †Sorbitorhynchus; Wang, Drapala, Barwick & Campbell in Campbell & Barwick, 1990

Extinct genus of fishes

Sorbitorhynchus is an extinct genus of prehistoric sarcopterygians, or lobe-finned fish. Fossils of this genus of marine lungfish have been found in Guangxi, China. The only described species in this genus is Sorbitorhynchus deleaskitus, but the holotype for this species may show some unusual malformations and thus not be useful for taxonomic or phylogenetic analysis.
