= Chirodipteridae =

Chirodipteridae Temporal range: Devonian

Scientific classification
- Kingdom: Animalia
- Phylum: Chordata
- Class: Dipnoi
- Suborder: †Dipteroidei
- Family: †Chirodipteridae; Campbell & Barwick, 1990

Genera
- †Chirodipterus (type); †Gogodipterus; †Palaedaphus; †Pillararhynchus; †Sorbitorhynchus

Extinct family of fishes

Chirodipteridae is an extinct family of prehistoric lungfishes that lived during the Devonian period.
