= Peter Schouten =

Australian illustrator

Peter Schouten AM FRSN
- Born: 1957 (age 67–68); Sydney, Australia
- Occupation: illustrator
- Years active: 1983 – present

Peter Mark Schouten is an Australian artist and illustrator of publications in the field of zoology and palaeontology. David Attenborough termed his skills as "rare and precious" and among the world's best.

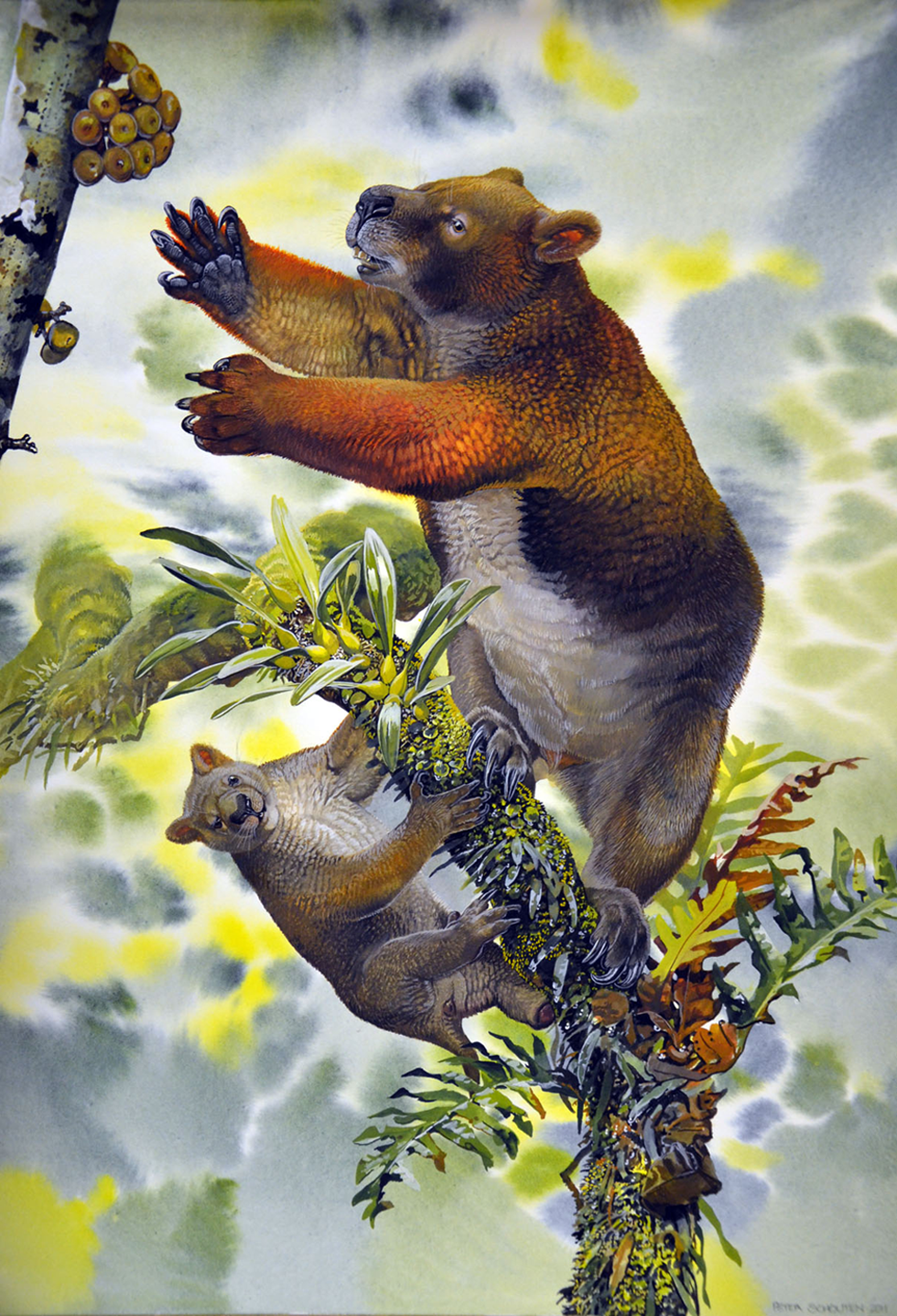
Reconstruction of Nimbadon lavarackorum mother and juvenile by Peter Schouten

His works are characterized by naturalism and faithfulness to detail, whereby Schouten incorporates his own ideas and assumptions in the reconstruction of extinct creatures and thus gives them an individual touch.

His early works deal mainly with the fauna of his home continent Australia, the first book in which his illustrations emerge throughout, Prehistoric Animals of Australia, also addresses this topic. During his work as an illustrator and co-author, he worked with several scientists, including Tim Flannery (Astonishing Animals, winner of the Victorian Premier's Literary Award 2005, A Gap in Nature, Possums of the World) and John Long (Feathered Dinosaurs).

Schouten became known internationally for his portrayal of Homo floresiensis, which was published in 2004 as the first scientific reconstruction of this species of Hominid. His work has been honoured in the epithet of a new species of Wakaleo, which was announced in 2017 prior to it formal publication. Schouten immediately began to work on an illustration of Wakaleo schouteni.

== Awards and honours ==
Schouten was appointed a Member of the Order of Australia in the 2015 Queen's Birthday Honours for "significant service to the visual arts as a wildlife and scientific illustrator, and to the preservation and documentation of Australian natural history". He was elected a Fellow of the Royal Society of New South Wales in March 2021.

== Works ==
Schouten's work as illustrator includes,

- Tree Kangaroos, A Curious Natural History. Reed Books Australia, 1996, ISBN 0-7301-0492-3.
- A Gap In Nature. Discovering World’s Extinct Animals. Atlantic Monthly Press, 2001, ISBN 0-87113-797-6.
- Astonishing Animals. Atlantic Monthly Press, 2004, ISBN 0-87113-875-1.
- Feathered Dinosaurs. The Origin Of Birds. Oxford University Press, 2008, ISBN 978-0-19-537266-3
- End of the Megafauna. The Fate of the World's Hugest, Fiercest, and Strangest Animals. W. W. Norton and Company, 2019, ISBN 978-0-393-24929-3.
