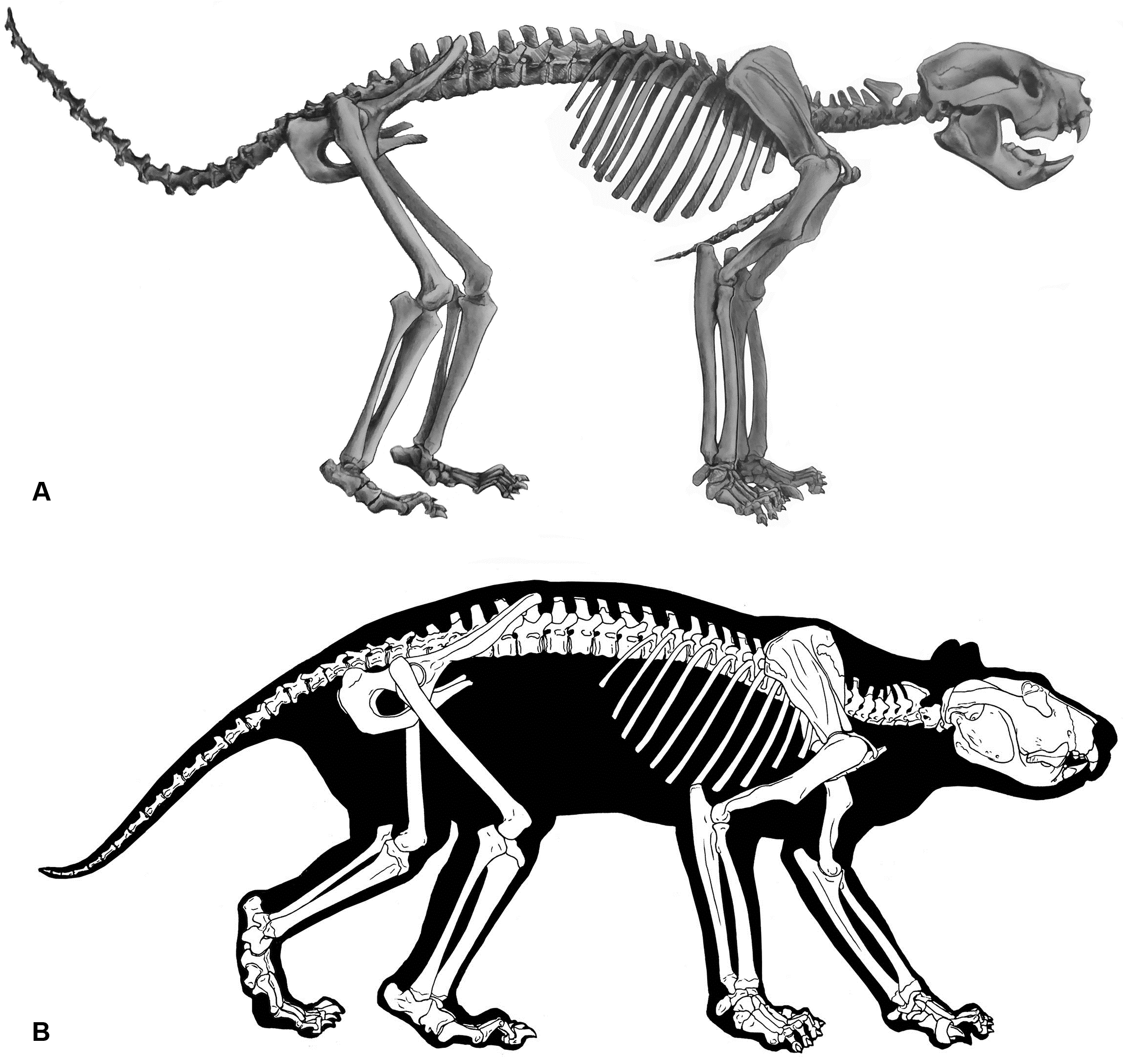
- Skeletal diagram of T. carnifex (top) and restored musculature based on living marsupials (bottom)

Scientific classification
- Kingdom: Animalia
- Phylum: Chordata
- Class: Mammalia
- Infraclass: Marsupialia
- Order: Diprotodontia
- Family: †Thylacoleonidae
- Genus: †Thylacoleo; Owen, 1859

Type species
- †Thylacoleo carnifex Owen, 1859

Other species
- †T. crassidentatus Bartholomai 1962; †T. hilli Pledge 1977

= Thylacoleo =

Thylacoleo Temporal range: Late Pliocene–Late Pleistocene

Extinct genus of marsupials

Thylacoleo ("pouch lion") is an extinct genus of carnivorous marsupials that lived in Australia from the late Pliocene to the Late Pleistocene (until around 40,000 years ago), often known as marsupial lions. They were the largest and last members of the family Thylacoleonidae, occupying the position of apex predator within Australian ecosystems. The largest and last species, Thylacoleo carnifex, had an estimated average weight of 101 to 130 kg (223 to 287 lb), approaching the weight of a modern lioness (Panthera leo).

== Taxonomy ==
The first Thylacoleo fossil findings were discovered by Thomas Mitchell in the 1830s in the Wellington Valley of New South Wales, though not recognised as such at the time. The generic holotype, consisting of broken teeth, jaws, and a skull, was discovered by a pastoralist, William Avery, near Lake Colungolac from which the species Thylacoleo carnifex was described by Richard Owen. It was not until 1966 that the first nearly-complete skeleton was found. The only pieces missing were a foot and the tail. Currently, the Nullarbor Plain of West Australia remains to be the greatest finding site. These fossils now reside at the Australian Museum.

The genus was first published in 1859, erected to describe the type species Thylacoleo carnifex. The new taxon was established in examination of fossil specimens provided to Richard Owen. The familial alliance takes its name from this description, the so-called marsupial lions of Thylacoleonidae.

The colloquial name "marsupial lion" alludes to the genus name, which was named after its superficial resemblance to the placental lion and its ecological niche as a large predator.

Genus: Thylacoleo (Thylacopardus) – Australia's marsupial lions, that lived from about 2 million years ago, during the Late Pliocene Epoch and became extinct about 40,000 years ago, during the Late Pleistocene Epoch. Three species are known:

- Thylacoleo carnifex The holotype cranium was collected from Lake Colongulac in 1843 by pastoralist William Adeney. A partial rostrum collected by Adeney in 1876 from the same locality would later be found to belong to the same individual. It was not until 1966 that the first nearly-complete skeleton was found.
- Thylacoleo crassidentatus lived during the Pliocene, around 5 million years ago, and was about the size of a large dog. Its fossils have been found in southeastern Queensland.
- Thylacoleo hilli lived during the Pliocene and was half the size of T. crassidentatus. It is the oldest member of the genus.

Fossils of other representatives of Thylacoleonidae, such as Microleo and Wakaleo, date back to the Late Oligocene Epoch, some 24 million years ago.

T. hilli was described by Neville Pledge in a study published in the records of the South Australia Museum in 1977. The holotype is a third premolar, discovered at a cave in Curramulka in South Australia, exhibiting the carnivorous characteristics of the genus and around half the size of T. carnifex. This tooth was collected by Alan Hill, a speleologist and founding member of the Cave Exploration Group of South Australia, while examining a site known as the "Town Cave" in 1956; the specific epithet hilli honours the collector of the first specimen. Material found amidst the fauna at Bow River in New South Wales, dated to the early Pliocene, was also referred to the species in 1982. A fragment of an incisor, unworn and only diagnosable to the genus, was located at a site in Curramulka, close to the Town Cave site, and referred to the species for the apparent correlation in size when compared to the better known T. carnifex.

The marsupial lion is classified in the order Diprotodontia along with many other well-known marsupials such as kangaroos, possums, and the koala. It is further classified in its own family, the Thylacoleonidae, of which three genera and 11 species are recognised, all extinct. The term marsupial lion (lower case) is often applied to other members of this family. Distinct possum-like characteristics led Thylacoleo to be regarded as members of Phalangeroidea for a few decades. Though a few authors continued to hint at phalangeroid affinities for thylacoleonids as recently as the 1990s, cranial and other characteristics have generally led to their inclusion within vombatiformes, and as stem-members of the wombat lineage. Marsupial lions and other ecologically and morphologically diverse vombatiforms were once represented by over 60 species of carnivorous, herbivorous, terrestrial and arboreal forms ranging in size from 3 kg to 2.5 tonnes. Only two families represented by four herbivorous species (koalas and three species of wombat) have survived into modern times and are considered the marsupial lion's closest living relatives.

== Evolution ==
The ancestors of thylacoleonids are believed to have been herbivores, something unusual for carnivores. They are members of the Vombatiformes, an almost entirely herbivorous order of marsupials, the only extant representatives of which are koalas and wombats, as well as extinct members such as the diprotodontids and palorchestids. The group first appeared in the Late Oligocene. The earliest thylacoleonids like Microleo were small possum-like animals, with the group increasing in size during the Miocene, with representatives like the leopard-sized Wakaleo. The genus Thylacoleo first appeared during the Pliocene, and represented the only extant genus of the family from that time until the end of the Pleistocene. The youngest representative of Thylacoleo and the thylacoleonids, T. carnifex, is the largest known member of the family. The earliest thylacoleonids are thought to have been arboreal (tree dwelling) animals, while Thylacoleo is thought to be terrestrial with some climbing capabilities.

== Description ==
Size comparison of Thylacoleo carnifex compared to a human. Scale bar = 1 metre (3 ft 3 in)

T. carnifex was a large carnivore, comparable to living big cats in size. Measurements taken from a number of specimens show they averaged 101 to 130 kg (223 to 287 lb) in weight, although individuals as large as 124–160 kg (273–353 lb) might not have been uncommon, and the largest weight was of 128–164 kg (282–362 lb). This would make it comparable to female lions and female tigers in general size. Estimates of the size of T. carnifex based on dental remains are typically dubious, in contrast to estimates based on proximal limb bone circumference. It is speculated that the species may have had some form of striped pattern based on rock art found in Arnhem Land has been claimed to depict the species, although this is uncertain, and the rock art may depict the thylacine instead.

=== Skull ===
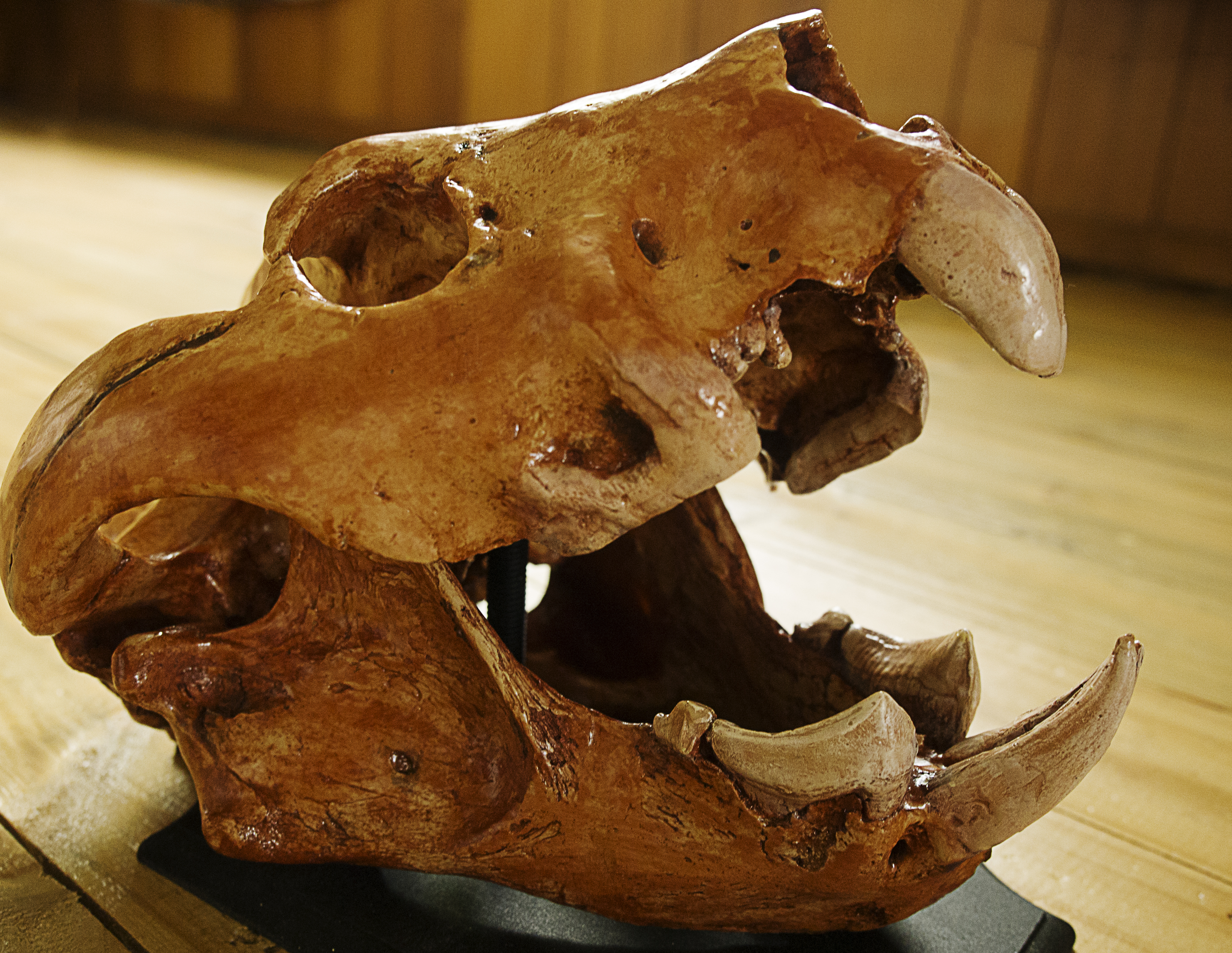
Skull of Thylacoleo carnifex

Like other thylacoleonids, Thylacoleo had blade-like third premolar teeth in the upper and lower jaws, that functioned as the carnassial teeth, with these teeth being present much further forwards in the jaw than in other mammals. Compared to earlier thyacoleonids, the third premolars were considerably enlarged. Thylacoleo also had a proportionally large pair of first incisors in the upper and lower jaws, which functioned analogously to other carnivores' canine teeth. They also had true canines but they served little purpose as they were stubby and not very sharp. Compared to earlier thylacoleonids, the number of molar teeth was reduced.

Pound for pound, T. carnifex had the strongest bite of any mammal species, living or extinct; a T. carnifex weighing 101 kg (223 lb) had a bite comparable to that of a 250 kg African lion, and research suggests that Thylacoleo could hunt and take prey much larger than itself. Larger animals that were likely prey include Diprotodon spp. and giant kangaroos. It seems improbable that Thylacoleo could achieve as high a bite force as a modern-day lion; however, this might have been possible when taking into consideration the size of its brain and skull. Carnivores usually have rather large brains when compared to herbivorous marsupials, which lessens the amount of bone that can be devoted to enhancing bite force. Thylacoleo however, is thought to have had substantially stronger muscle attachments and therefore a smaller brain. Some later studies questioned the ability of the canine teeth to deliver a killing bite.

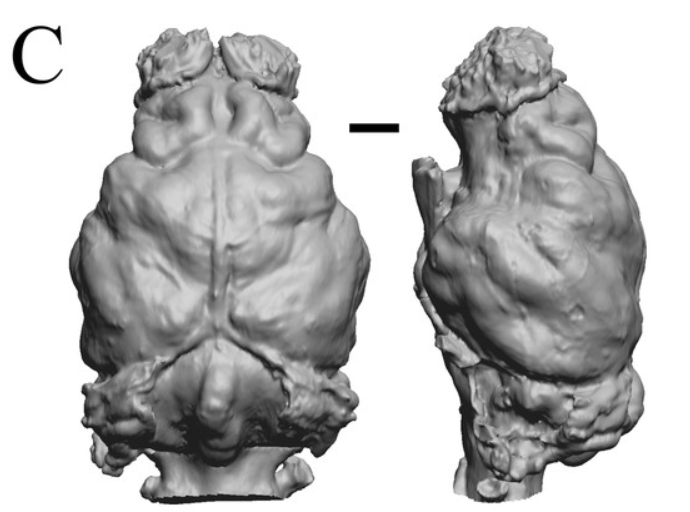
Digital endocast of the cranial cavity of Thylacoleo carniflex (SAMA P18681 = FMNH PM 59244).

Using 3D modeling based on X-ray computed tomography scans, marsupial lions were found to be unable to use the prolonged, suffocating bite typical of living big cats. They instead had an extremely efficient and unique bite; the incisors would have been used to stab at and pierce the flesh of their prey while the more specialised carnassials crushed the windpipe, severed the spinal cord, and lacerated the major blood vessels such as the carotid artery and jugular vein. The skull was so specialized for big game that it was very inefficient at catching smaller animals, which possibly contributed to its extinction.

=== Postcranium ===
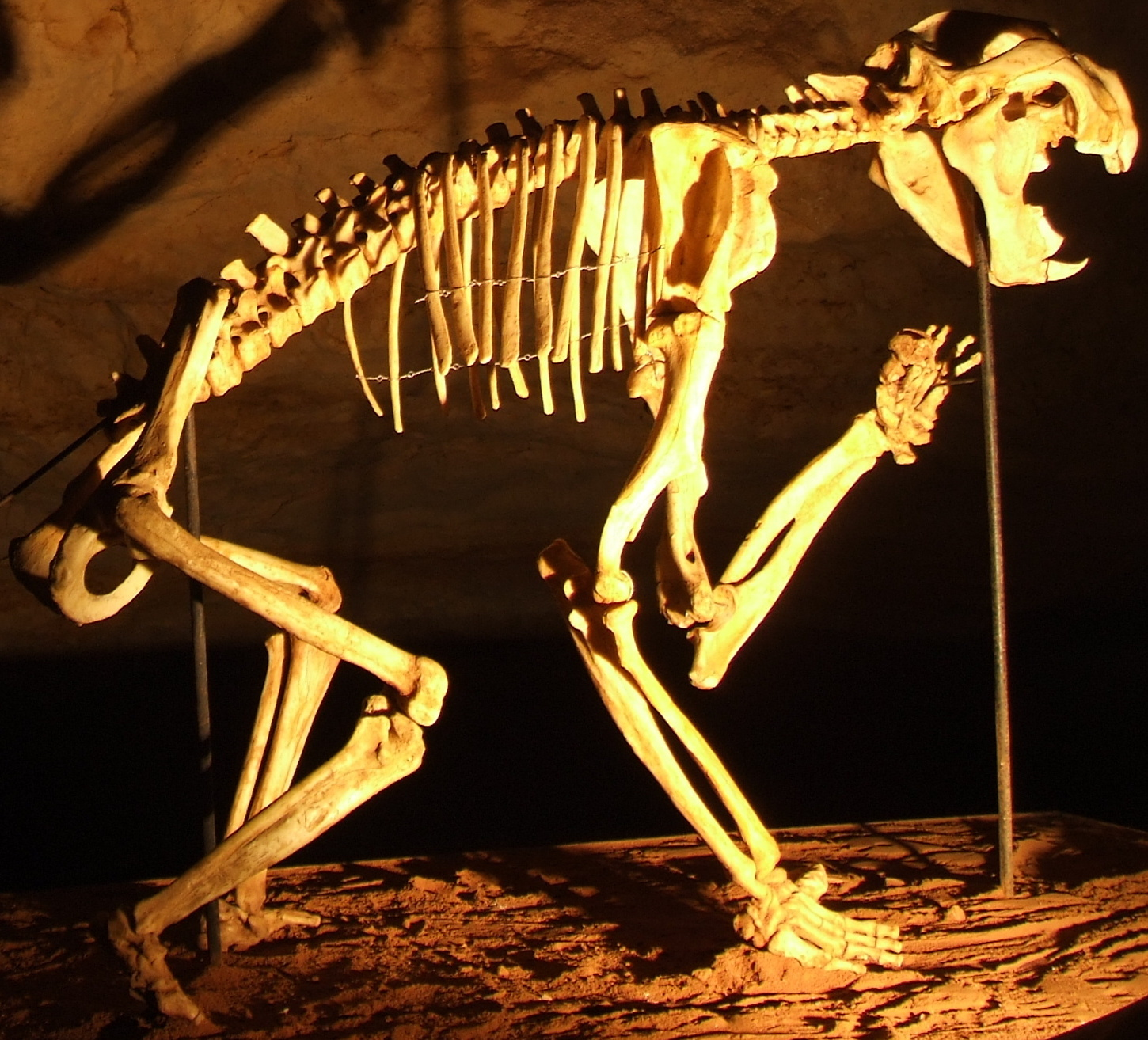
Skeleton at Naracoorte Caves

Thylacoleo had highly mobile and powerful forelimbs used to grapple prey, with each manus having a single very large retractable hooked claw set on large semi-opposable thumbs, which are suggested to have been used deal a killing blow.

The hind feet had four functional toes, the first digit being much reduced in size, but possessing a roughened pad similar to that of possums, which may have assisted with climbing. The discovery in 2005 of a specimen which included complete hind feet provided evidence that the marsupial lion exhibited syndactyly (fused second and third toes) like other diprotodonts.

Its strong forelimbs and retracting claws mean that Thylacoleo possibly climbed trees and perhaps carried carcasses to keep the kill for itself (similar to the leopard today). The climbing ability would have also helped them climb out of caves, which could therefore have been used as dens to rear their young. Specialised tail bones called chevrons strengthened the tail, likely allowing the animal to use it to prop itself up while rearing on its hind legs, which may have been done when climbing or attacking prey.

The lumbar region is relatively rigid and straight, and suggests that the lower back was relatively inflexible.

== Ecology ==
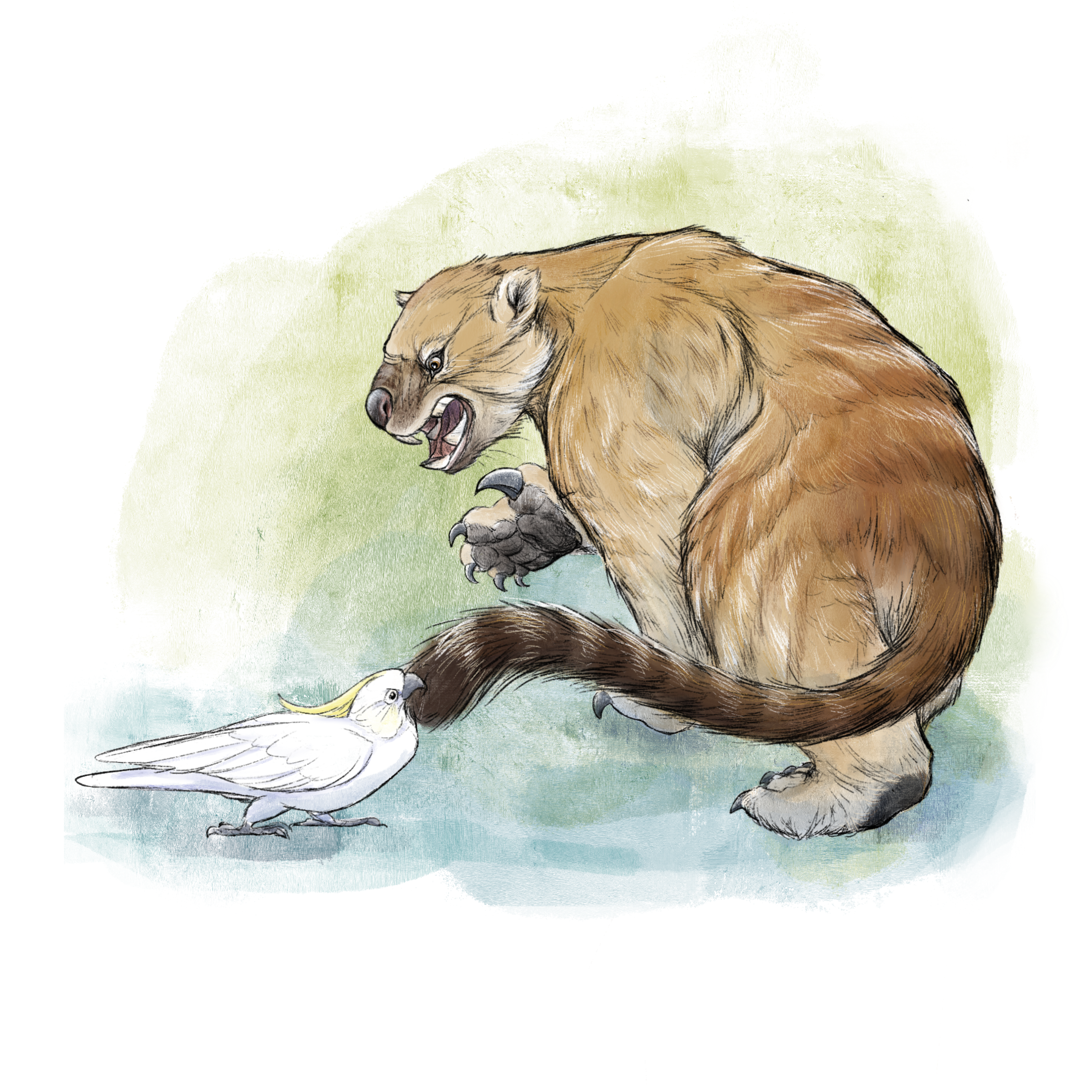
Life restoration of Thylacoleo carnifex

When Thylacoleo was first described by Richard Owen, he considered it to be a carnivore, based on the morphology of its skull and teeth. However other anatomists, such as William Henry Flower disagreed. Flower was the first to place Thylacoleo with the Diprotodonts, noting its skull and teeth to be laid out more like those of the koala and the wombat, and suggested that it was more likely a herbivore. Owen did not disagree with Flower's placement of Thylacoleo with the Diprotodonts, but still maintained that it was a carnivore, despite its herbivorous ancestry. Owen found little support in his lifetime, despite the pointing out of Thylacoleo's retractable claws, something only found in mammalian carnivores, and its lack of any ability to chew plant material. In 1911, a study by Spencer and Walcott claimed that certain marks on the bones of megafauna had been made by Thylacoleo, but according to Horton (1979) they were not sufficiently rigorous, resulting in their arguments being strongly challenged by later scholars, such as Anderson (1929), and later Gill (1951, 1952, 1954), thereby leaving the issue unresolved.

Besides the most common hypothesis that it was an active predator, a variety of other theories existed in the late 19th to early 20th centuries as to the diet and feeding of Thylacoleo, with hypotheses of it being a scavenger filling the ecological niche of hyenas, being a specialist of crocodile eggs, or even a melon-eater. As late as 1954, doubts were still being raised as to whether it was actually a hypercarnivore.

In 1981, another paper was published arguing that certain cuts to bones of large marsupials had been caused by Thylacoleo. This paper by Horton and Wright was able to counter earlier arguments that such marks were the result of humans, largely by pointing out the presence of similar marks on the opposite side of many bones. They concluded that humans were extremely unlikely to have made the marks in question, but that if so "they had set out to produce only marks consistent with what Thylacoleo would produce". Since then, the academic consensus has emerged that Thylacoleo was a predator and a hypercarnivore.

The marsupial lion's limb proportions and muscle mass distribution indicate that, although it was a powerful animal, it was not a particularly fast runner. Paleontologists conjecture that it was an ambush predator, possibly using leaping. Incisions on bones of the extinct large kangaroo Macropus titan, and the general morphology of Thylacoleo suggests that it fed in a similar manner to modern cheetahs, by using their sharp teeth to slice open the ribcage of their prey, thereby accessing the internal organs. They may have killed by using their front claws as either stabbing weapons or as a way to grab their prey with strangulation or suffocation. Other large bodied prey may have included the large kangaroos Sthenurus, Procoptodon, Protemnodon, Macropus and Osphranter as well as possibly the largest Australian marsupial, the rhinoceros-sized vombatoid Diprotodon. The animal appears to have coexisted with the thylacine; however, it did not compete with it because their dietary niches did not overlap.

Trace fossils in the form of claw marks and bones from caves in Western Australia analyzed by Samuel Arman and Gavin Prideaux indicate marsupial lions could also climb rock faces, and likely reared their young in such caves as a way of protecting them from potential predators. The large proportion of juveniles in the caves suggests communal living and gregariousness in T. carnifex.

Like many predators, it was probably also an opportunistic scavenger, feeding on carrion and driving off less powerful predators from their kills. It also may have shared behaviours exhibited by recent diprotodont marsupials such as kangaroos, like digging shallow holes under trees to reduce body temperature during the day.

Analysis of finds on the Nullarbor Plain suggests that Thylacoleo carnifex inhabited open, arid environments similar to those found across much of Australia today.

== Extinction ==
Thylacoleo is thought to have become extinct around 40,000 years ago as part of the Late Pleistocene megafauna extinctions, essentially simultanteously with the vast majority of Australian megafauna. The relative importance of climatic change versus the impact of recently arrived Indigenous Australians (who arrived in Australia around 50-60,000 years ago) in the extinctions has been debated. There is limited evidence of human interaction with extinct megafauna in Australia.
