= Pillararhynchus =

Scientific classification
- Kingdom: Animalia
- Phylum: Chordata
- Class: Dipnoi
- Family: †Chirodipteridae
- Genus: †Pillararhynchus; Campbell & Barwick, 1990

Extinct genus of fishes

Pillararhynchus is an extinct genus of prehistoric sarcopterygians or lobe-finned fish.

== See also ==
- Sarcopterygii
