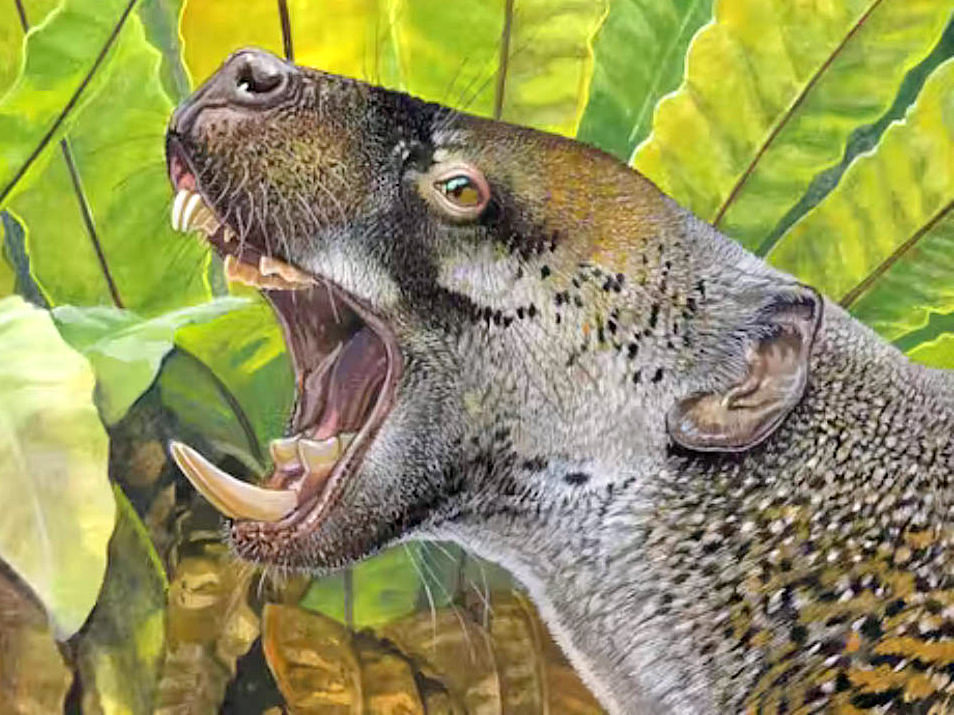
- Life reconstruction of the type species, Wakaleo oldfieldi

Scientific classification
- Kingdom: Animalia
- Phylum: Chordata
- Class: Mammalia
- Infraclass: Marsupialia
- Order: Diprotodontia
- Family: †Thylacoleonidae
- Genus: †Wakaleo; Clemens & Plane, 1974

Type species
- †Wakaleo oldfieldi Clemens & Plane, 1974

Species
- †W. alcootaensis Archer & Rich, 1984; †W. oldfieldi Clemens & Plane, 1974 (type); †W. pitikantensis Rauscher, 1987; †W. schouteni Gillespie, Archer & Hand, 2017; †W. vanderleuri Clemens & Plane, 1974

Synonyms
- Priscileo pitikantensis Rauscher, 1987

= Wakaleo =

Wakaleo Temporal range: Late Oligocene–Late Miocene

Extinct genus of marsupials

Wakaleo (Diyari waka, "little", "small"; and Latin leo, "lion") is an extinct genus of medium-sized thylacoleonids that lived in Australia in the Late Oligocene and Miocene Epochs.

== Taxonomy ==
Wakaleo was erected in 1974 by W. A. Clemens and M. Plane. Five species are known:

- Wakaleo alcootaensis was found in the Miocene Waite Formation in the Northern Territory in 1974. It was slightly larger than the other two species.
- Wakaleo oldfieldi was found by a group of scientists working in the Miocene Wipijiri Formation in southern Australia in 1971. They found a nearly complete left dentary which included a few well-preserved teeth.
- Wakaleo pitikantensis described by Rauscher as the type species of the genus Priscileo in 1987 and placed with this genus in a revision published in 2017.
- Wakaleo schouteni Gillespie, Archer & Hand, 2017, a mid-sized species of the genus.
- Wakaleo vanderleuri was first found by field workers in 1967 in the Miocene Camfield Beds in the Northern Territory. Many more specimens have been found since then.

== Description ==
Wakaleo is a genus of the thylacoleonid family of predatory mammals, which are known as marsupial lions. The size of Wakaleo species increased over the course of the evolution of the genus. W. schouteni is estimated to have weighed approximately 23 kilograms (51 lb), comparable to a dog, while W. vanderleueri and W. alcootaensis are estimated to have had bodymasses of 30 kilograms (66 lb) and 50 kilograms (110 lb).

=== Wakaleo alcootaensis ===
The first description was given in an examination of material discovered at Alcoota in the Northern Territory of Australia. The holotype was a single fossil maxilla fragment found in 1974 by the palaeontologist Michael Archer.

Fossil material of this species is fragmentary and rare, and it is only known amongst the Alcoota local fauna. Further evidence of the animals cranial and dental features were examined in 2014, leading to a revision of Wakaleo alcootaensis that provided further support to the separation from earlier Wakaleo species.

=== Wakaleo oldfieldi ===
Wakaleo oldfieldi is an extinct species of marsupial lions of the genus Wakaleo, found in Miocene deposits of South Australia. It had three unfused molar teeth instead of two fused molars as is the case with the Pleistocene Thylacoleo carnifex. As with Thylacoleo carnifex, this species is presumed to have used its maxillary (upper) teeth to hold its food and sharpen the mandibular teeth, the latter were also used in slicing and stabbing during eating. The premolars also had a crescent-shaped circumference for slicing.

=== Wakaleo pitikantensis ===
The description by Rauscher was published in 1987, naming a new species and genus as Priscileo pitikantensis. The designation as the type species of the genus Priscileo was later recognised as a species of a revised description of Wakaleo. Fossil material examined by Rauscher was obtained at Lake Pitikanta, situated to the east of Lake Eyre.

The smallest known species of Wakaleo, it lived in Australia about 25 million years ago, from the late Oligocene to middle Miocene, and was approximately the size of a cat. They were mid-sized predators who probably hunted in trees or ambushed prey from a branch. Like the later discovery, Wakaleo schouteni, the species possesses three premolars and four molars which distinguishes them from others of the genus. A little smaller than W. schouteni, this species also differs in the morphology of the humerus.

It is known only from a few post cranial bones and a poorly preserved maxillary fragment found at the Lake Pitikanta site of the Lake Ngapakaldi to Lake Palankarinna Fossil Area in northeastern South Australia. To date W. pitikantensis, Wakaleo schouteni and "Priscileo' roskellyae are the most ancient phylogenies of the Thylacoleonidae and presumed to have diverged during the early to middle Oligocene epoch.

=== Wakaleo schouteni ===
The description of the species was published in 2017, the collaborating authors Anna Gillespie, Mike Archer and Suzanne Hand working on the PANGEA research project based at the University of New South Wales. The holotype is a largely complete skull retaining some teeth and alveoli, with other materials such as the lower jaw and a humerus associated with the new species as paratypes. The discovery of more complete evidence of Oligocene species of the marsupial lion lineages prompted the authors to emend the circumscription of Wakaleo to include the type species of another genus, Priscileo pitikantensis, as a sister species to this taxon and contradicting a 2016 study that supported separation of P. pitikantensis from the wakaleo clade. Another early thylacoleonid species, "Priscileo" roskellyae, was determined to have diverged from this genus during early period of the fossil record, and scant evidence of the species did not allow revising authors to assign a taxonomic placement with any confidence.

A painter celebrated for his reconstructions of ancient animals, Peter Schouten, was honored by the authors in their proposed epithet for the species.

A species assigned to Wakaleo and resembling a contemporary animal of the Oligocene, Wakaleo pitikantensis. They were mid-sized predators who probably hunted in trees or ambushed prey from a branch. Calculations of the size following a method of statistical analysis for predicting body size, derived from 164 millimetres for the greatest length of the skull, indicate a weight of 22.6 or 24.0 kilograms. Another estimate using regression equations previously used in calculations of body size for Thylacoleo carnifex, a very large carnivore, resulted in a value around 5 kg that the describing authors considered too small. The dentition suggests that W. schouteni may have been omnivorous, but reveals the transition to hyper-carnivory of the genus during the Miocene.

The distribution of the species included the Riversleigh World Heritage Area in the northwest of Queensland, at sediments dated to the later Oligocene to early Miocene. The assumption of at least partially arboreal habits is by the forest types that existed during the Oligo-Miocene at Riversleigh, open woodlands with the later development of rainforest. The humerus morphology is proposed to support this conception as a scansorial and arboreal predator, being similar to the structures of the arm and shoulder in species such as Phascolarctos cinereus, the related koala, and spotted cuscus Spilocuscus maculatus.

=== Wakaleo vanderleuri ===
The type species fossils were originally found in the Bullock Creek (Northern Territory) area. It has been found in limestone deposits in Riversleigh.

The first fossil, a right dentary fragment, was found in 1967 by a group of field workers at Bullock Creek in the Northern Territory. A left dentary of the species in a good state of preservation was described in 1986. Since then more fossils have been recovered, including a well-preserved near-complete cranium with the mandible intact.

== Ecology ==
The various species of Wakaleo are thought to have been carnivores. Later species of Wakaleo show increased adaptation to terrestrial locomotion (as opposed to the arboreal lifestyle of earlier species), and to grappling prey with their forelimbs, likely correlated with increasing prey size.
