= John A. Long =

Australian palaeontologist

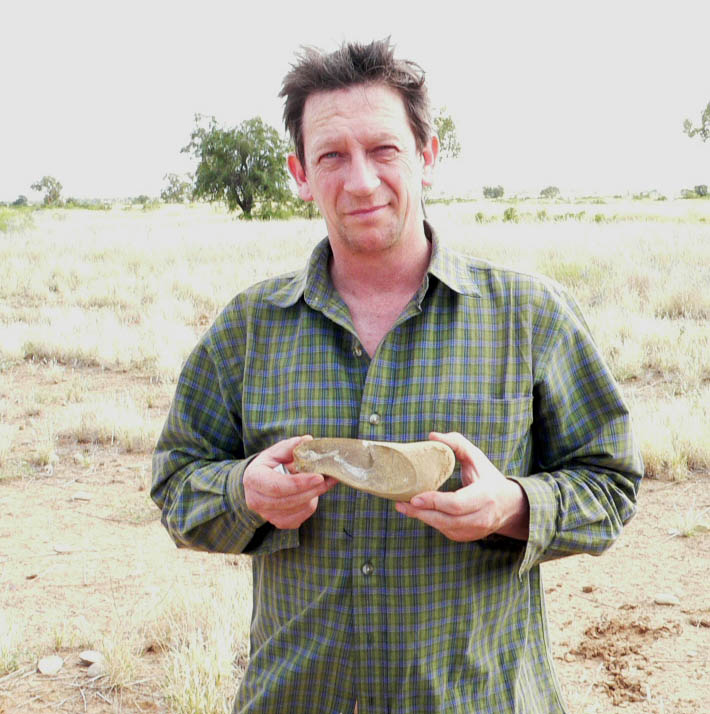
John Long in the field with Gogo fossil fish, July 2005.

John Albert Long (born 1957) is an Australian paleontologist who is currently emeritus professor in Palaeontology at Flinders University in Adelaide, South Australia, where he was previously the Strategic Professor in Palaeontology (2012–2025). Before then he was Vice President of Research and Collections at the Natural History Museum of Los Angeles County. He is also an author of popular science books. His main area of research is on the fossil fish of the Late Devonian Gogo Formation from northern Western Australia. It has yielded many important insights into fish evolution, such as Gogonasus and Materpiscis, the later specimen being crucial to our understanding of the origins of vertebrate reproduction. Further research on Gogo fishes included a perfect new colecanth Ngamugawi wirngarri, which showed through detailed analysis how coelacanth evolution had been influenced by plate tectonic movements.

His love of fossil collecting began at age 7 and he graduated with PhD from Monash University in 1984, specialising in Palaeozoic fish evolution. He held postdoctoral positions at the Australian National University (1984–85, Rothmans Fellow), The University of Western Australia (1986–87, Queen Elizabeth II Award) and The University of Tasmania (1988–89, ARC Fellow) before taking up a position as Curator in Vertebrate Palaeontology at the Western Australian Museum (1989–2004), and then as Head of Sciences at Museum Victoria (2004–2009).

== Paleontological research ==
Long's paleontological research has involved field work collecting and studying Palaeozoic fishes throughout Australia, Antarctica, South Africa, Iran, Vietnam, Thailand and China. Long's early research led to the refinement of a new biostratigraphic scheme for dating Palaeozoic sequences in Victoria, Australia.

Most of his later research has focussed on collecting and describing the well-preserved 3-dimensional Devonian fishes from the Gogo Formation, Western Australia. His major discoveries from his field expeditions to the Gogo fossil sites (1986–2008) included the first complete skull of an osteolepiform fish, Gogonasus, and a new specimen showing that Gogonasus had large spiracles opening on top of its head. Other discoveries include several new types of dipnoans and arthrodires, and the discovery of the first Devonian fishes showing embryos inside them. This later discovery, published in the journal Nature (May 2008) was the first time that reproduction by internal fertilisation was demonstrated in the extinct Class Placodermi, and the oldest evidence for vertebrate viviparity yet discovered. One of the specimens, named Materpiscis, was also the only known fossil to show a mineralised umbilical structure linked to the unborn embryo. Nature magazine made a short documentary video about this discovery. Other Gogo fish fossils have been found showing remarkable preservation of 3-D muscle tissues, nerve cells and microcapillaries, making this one of the world's most extraordinary sites for exceptional preservation of fossils of this age.

One of Long's discoveries, the placoderm Mcnamaraspis, made history by becoming Australia's first official state fossil emblem when it was declared by the Governor as the Western Australian fossil emblem on 5 December 1995.

== Science communication and books ==
In addition to his work as a palaeontologist John Long has been prominent as a key science communicator in Australia, mainly through his many popular science books, written for both adults and children, which include works of fiction as well as non-fiction. His book The Rise of Fishes −500 Million Years of Evolution is widely used as a standard reference on fish evolution, and his books dealing with Australian dinosaurs and Mesozoic faunas, and on Australian and New Guinean prehistoric mammals were the first tomes to comprehensively cover these topics. His work collecting fossils in Antarctica was published as a book Mountains of Madness – A Scientist's Odyssey Through Antarctica that gave the first detailed account of a modern scientific expedition to Antarctica as told from the scientist's viewpoint.

His work on the international fossil trade, which highlighted problems of fossil smuggling and ignorance of legislation, was made into a 2-part documentary series entitled The Dinosaur Dealers, and published as a book of the same name. He has been active in Australia since the late 1990s dealing with issues of fossil repatriation, legislation and heritage. His books for children include two novels based on cutting-edge research that paint vivid pictures of travelling back in time to experience the varied landscapes of prehistoric Australia (Mystery of Devils Roost, Journey to the Dawn of Time) as well as non-fiction works dealing mainly with dinosaurs and prehistory, but also with the environment and climate change and the development of human civilizations.

In 2024 he published the first popular book telling the 465 million year story of the evolution of sharks, The Secret History of Sharks-The Rise of the Ocean's Most Fearsome Predators, with chapters on living sharks and their plight included.

Since 2013 John Long has written or been involved in producing 58 articles for The Conversation website which has had over 3 million hits. His work has been selected for the 2015 and 2017 Anthology of Best Australian Science Writing.

== Professional service ==
John Long became the first Australian to hold the position of President of the Society of Vertebrate Paleontology (SVP), an office between 2014 and 2016. Between 2016 and 2019 he was President of the Royal Society of South Australia. John Long has also been an active participant in protecting Australian fossil heritage. He has actively participated in the campaign to update the Heritage status of the Beaumaris fossil site in Melbourne to protect it from future development.

== Awards and recognition ==
Long's awards include the 2001 Eureka Prize for the Promotion of Science, the 2003 Riversleigh Society Medal for promoting the understanding of Australian prehistory, and the 2008 Australasian Science Prize, a prize awarded across all disciplines of science and medicine each year by Australasian Science magazine for excellence in peer-reviewed research. The 2008 Prize was awarded for the discovery of the world's oldest vertebrate embryos.

Long's literary awards include the 2006 Best Primary Reference book by the Australian Publishers Association for The Big Picture Book- Life on Earth Unfolding Through Time, which also picked up the 2006 Environmental Award for Children's Literature (non-fiction) and was short-listed for the best information book (Eve Pownall Award of the Children's Book Council) and shortlisted for best children's book in the Western Australian Premier's Book Awards 2006.

In 2007 his book Swimming in Stone-The Amazing Gogo Fossils of the Kimberley was shortlisted for the Science writing prize of the Victorian Premier's Literary Awards.

In 2011 Long and colleagues Kate Trinajstic, Gavin Young & Tim Senden were short-listed for the Eureka Prize for Scientific Research. In December 2011 Long received the 2011 Research Medal of the Royal Society of Victoria (Category Earth Sciences).

In 2014 he was awarded the Verco Medal for research from the Royal Society of South Australia.

In 2016 he was part of Prof Ross Large's team TEPO (Trace Elements in Past Oceans) which won the 2016 Eureka Prize for Excellence in Interdisciplinary Scientific Research.

In 2019, he won the Jim Bettison and Helen James Award at the Adelaide Film Festival.

In 2023 he was part of the team that won the Whitley Medal for their book on "Prehistoric Australasia- Visions of Evolution and Extinction".

Long was elected a Fellow of the Australian Academy of Science in 2026.

== Books ==
- Long, J. (1991) Dinosaurs of Australia, and other animals of the Mesozoic Era, Reed Books: Sydney. ISBN 0-7301-0333-1.
- Long, J. A.& McNamara, K.J. (1992) Sea Monsters, Western Australian Museum: Perth.
- Long, J. A. (ed) (1993) Palaeozoic Vertebrate Biostratigraphy and Biogeography Belhaven Press: UK.; (1994), Johns Hopkins University Press, Baltimore, US, ISBN 0-8018-4779-6.
- Long, J. A. (1995) The Rise of Fishes: 500 Million Years of Evolution University of New South Wales Press: Sydney; also (1995) Johns Hopkins University Press, Baltimore: US, ISBN 0-86840-078-5.
- Long, J. A. 1997. "Mystery of Devil's Roost". Fremantle Arts Centre Press, Fremantle, WA. 128 pp.
- Mcnamara, K. J. and Long, J. A. 1998. "The Evolution Revolution". Wiley and Sons, London and New York. 299pp. ISBN 0-471-97406-4.
- Long, J. A. 1998. "The Dinosaurs of Australia and New Zealand, and other animals of the Mesozoic Era". University of New South Wales Press, Sydney; Harvard University Press, MA. US. 182pp. ISBN 0-86840-448-9.
- Baynes, A. & Long, J. A. (eds). "Papers in Vertebrate Palaeontology". Records of the Western Australian Museum Supplement 57, 424pp. ISBN 0-7307-1251-6.
- Long, J. 2000. "Mountains of Madness- A Scientist's Odyssey through Antarctica". Joseph Henry Press, US (National Academies Press), ISBN 0-309-07077-5.
- Brochu, C, Long, J.A., McHenry, C., Scanlon, J.D., Willis, P. 2000 Dinosaurs. The Time-Life Guides. Time Life Books, US. ISBN 0-7370-0081-3.
- Long J. 2002. "The Dinosaur Dealers". Allen & Unwin, Sydney. 220 pp., ISBN 1-86508-829-3
- Long, J. A., Archer, M., Flannery T.F. & Hand, S. 2002. Prehistoric Mammals of Australia and New Guinea: One Hundred Million Years of Evolution. University of New South Wales Press, NSW / Johns Hopkins University Press, Baltimore, US. 244pp. ISBN 0-86840-435-7.
- Long, J. 2003. "The Journey to the Dawn of Time". Fremantle Arts Centre Press. 152pp. ISBN 1-86368-357-7.
- Long, J. 2004. "Gogo Fish! The story of the Western Australian State fossil emblem." The Western Australian Museum, Perth. 48pp. ISBN 1-920843-08-6.
- Long, J. 2004. "Its True! Dinosaurs Never Died!" Allen & Unwin, Sydney. 88pp. ISBN 1-74114-274-1; ISBN 978-1-74114-274-7
- Long. J. A. & Choo, B. 2005. "The Big Picture Book."Allen & Unwin, Melbourne. 48pp. ISBN 978-1-74114-328-7
- Long, J. 2006. "Swimming in Stone – the Amazing Gogo Fossils of the Kimberley" Fremantle Arts Centre Press, Fremantle. 320pp. ISBN 1-921064-33-1
- McNamara, K.J. & Long, J. 2007. "The Evolution Revolution-Design without intelligence". Melbourne University Publishing, Melbourne 304pp. ISBN 0-522-85338-2
- Brochu, C, Long, J.A., McHenry, C., Scanlon, J.D., Willis, P. 2007. Dinosaurs. Revised and Updated. The best-selling guide to understanding dinosaurs. Edited by: Brett-Surmann, Michael K., Fog City Press, San Francisco, 256pp. ISBN 978-1-74089-584-2. 1993.
- Long, J. 2008. "The Big Picture Book of Environments". Allen & Unwin, Sydney. 48pp. ISBN 978-1-74114-328-7
- Long, J. & Schouten, P. 2008. "Feathered Dinosaurs: The Origin of Birds". CSIRO Press, Melbourne, Oxford University Press, UK, US. 194pp. ISBN 978-0-643-09434-5.
- Long, J. 2009. "The Big Picture Book of Human Civilization". Allen & Unwin, Sydney. 48pp. ISBN 978-1-74175-700-2
- Long, J. 2009. "The Short, Tragic Life of Leo the Marsupial Lion". Western Australian Museum, Perth.32pp. ISBN 978-1-920843-94-6
- Long, J. 2010. "The Rise of Fishes −500 Million Years of Evolution" 2nd edition. Johns Hopkins University Press, Baltimore, US. ISBN 978-0-8018-9695-8 (HB) 284pp.
- Long, J. 2011. "Hung Like an Argentine Duck – The Prehistoric Origins of Sexual Intimacy". HarperCollins, Australia, ISBN 978-0-7322-9273-7 (PB), 278pp.
- Stilwell, J.D. & Long, J.A. 2011. Frozen in Time – Prehistoric Life in Antarctica. C.S.I.R.O. Publishing, Melbourne, ISBN 978-0-643-09635-6 (HB), 248pp.
- Long J.A. 2012. "Dawn of the Deed -The Prehistoric Origins of Sex". University of Chicago Press, Illinois. 296pp, ISBN 9780226492544. http://www.press.uchicago.edu/ucp/books/book/chicago/D/bo13183022.html
- Archer, M, Hand, S, Long, J, Worthy, T. 2023. Prehistoric Australasia -Visions of Evolution and Extinction.C.S.I.R.O. Publishing, Melbourne, Australia, 264pp. ISBN 9780643108059.
- Long J. 2024. "The Secret History of Sharks-The Rise of the Ocean's Most Fearsome Predators" Ballantine Books, Penguin Random House, New York, NY, USA. 480pp. ISBN 9780593598078.
