= Geiseltal (fossil deposit) =

Fossil deposit in Germany

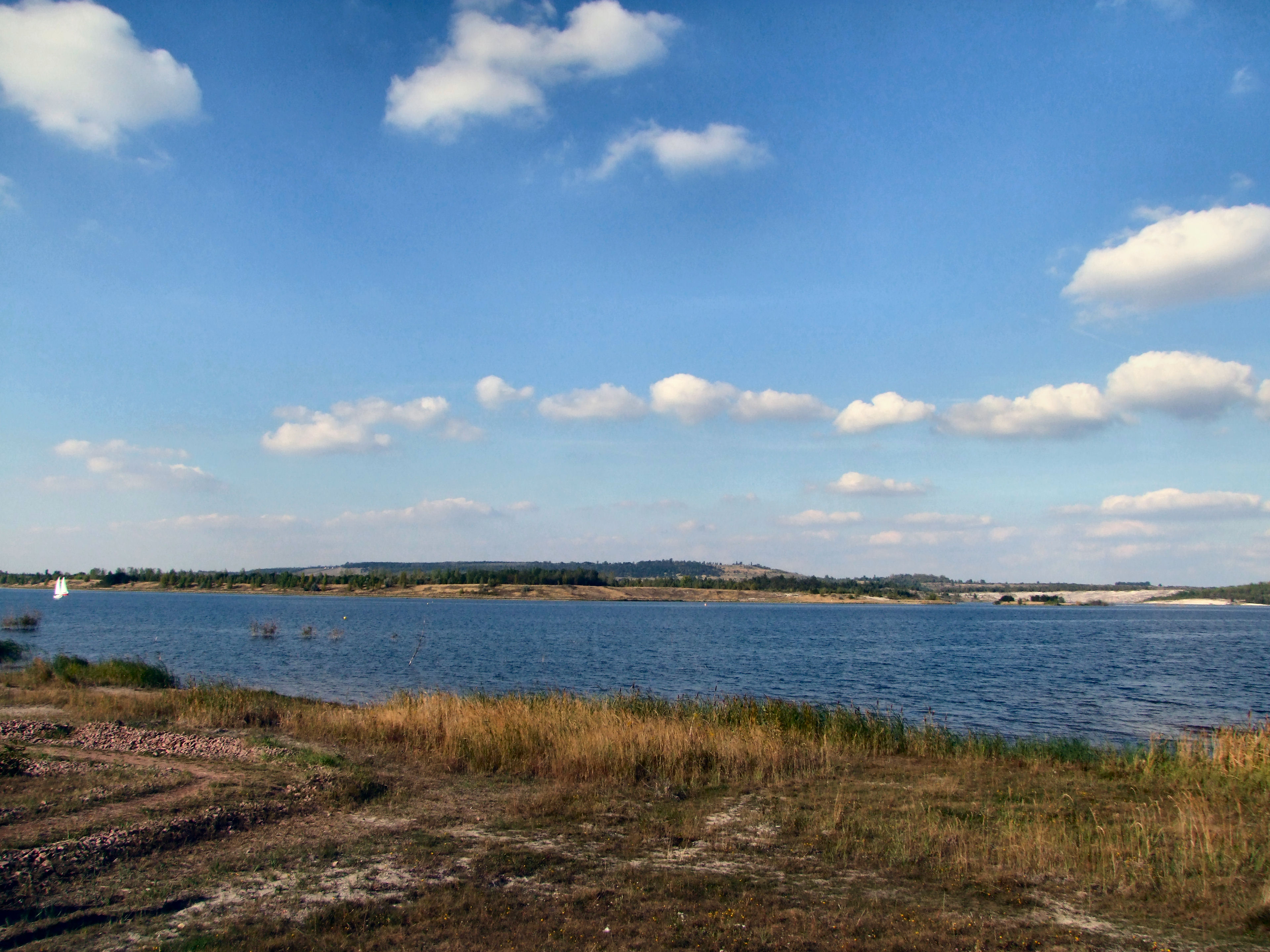
View over the western Geisel valley from the south, with the spoil tip at Klobikau in the background

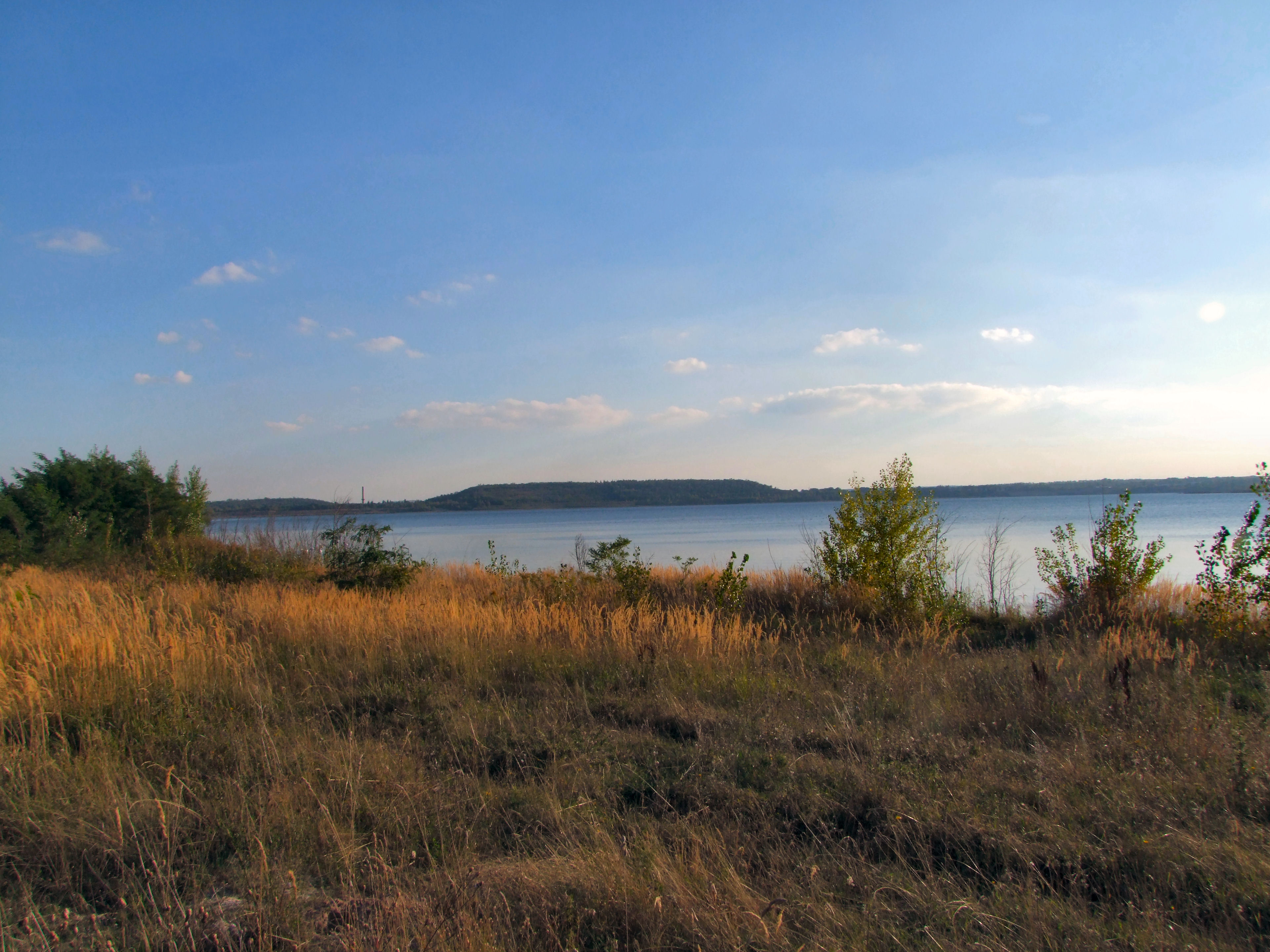
View over the central Geisel valley from the north, with the spoil tip at Pfännerhall in the background

The Geiseltal fossil deposit is located in the former lignite district of the Geiseltal south of the city of Halle in Saxony-Anhalt, Germany. It is an important site of now extinct plants and animals from the Middle Eocene period 48 to 41 million years ago. There is evidence that coal was first mined in the Geiseltal in 1698, but the first fossils only came to light by chance at the beginning of the 20th century. Scheduled scientific excavations began in 1925 by the Martin Luther University Halle-Wittenberg. Interrupted by World War II, the investigations can be divided into two research phases. Due to the increasing depletion of the raw material deposits, the excavations gradually came to a standstill in the mid-1980s and finally ended at the beginning of the third millennium.

The lignite of the Geiseltal is subdivided into four main seams, the three lower ones were mainly fossil-bearing. The focus of the fossil distribution is in the southern and central Geiseltal. The finds include remains of plants and animals. A special feature are almost complete finds with leaves, fruits and stems, but also skeletons of vertebrates and remains of insects. One of the most famous finds is that of a complete skeleton of the prehistoric horse Propalaeotherium from 1933. Other vertebrates include even-toed ungulates, small mammals such as insectivores and bats as well as birds, crocodiles, turtles, snakes, amphibians and fish. Remains of soft tissue were also found in numerous vertebrates. In total, more than 80 individual sites with more than 50,000 finds are known, including 36 with a significant number of vertebrates. Due to the good and extensive preservation of fossils, the Geiseltal is considered a conserve and concentrate deposit.

The special feature of the Geiseltal fossils, above all the vertebrates and especially the mammals, lies in their unique preservation in lignite, which is not found anywhere else in Central Europe. The Geiseltal is an important site for the development of mammals, as the development of individual groups can be observed there over a period of several million years. This makes the mammal fauna a reference for the Geiseltalium, a section of the stratigraphy of European land mammals from 47 to 43 million years ago. The extensive finds from the animal and plant world, as well as the numerous geological data, make it possible to reconstruct the landscape quite accurately. According to this, at the time of lignite formation there was a multi-storey lowland forest near the coast, which was interspersed with streams, ponds and bogs. The forest was subject to the influence of subtropical climate and was home to a species-rich fauna. The entire fossil record of the Geiseltal is under national protection.

== Geographical location ==
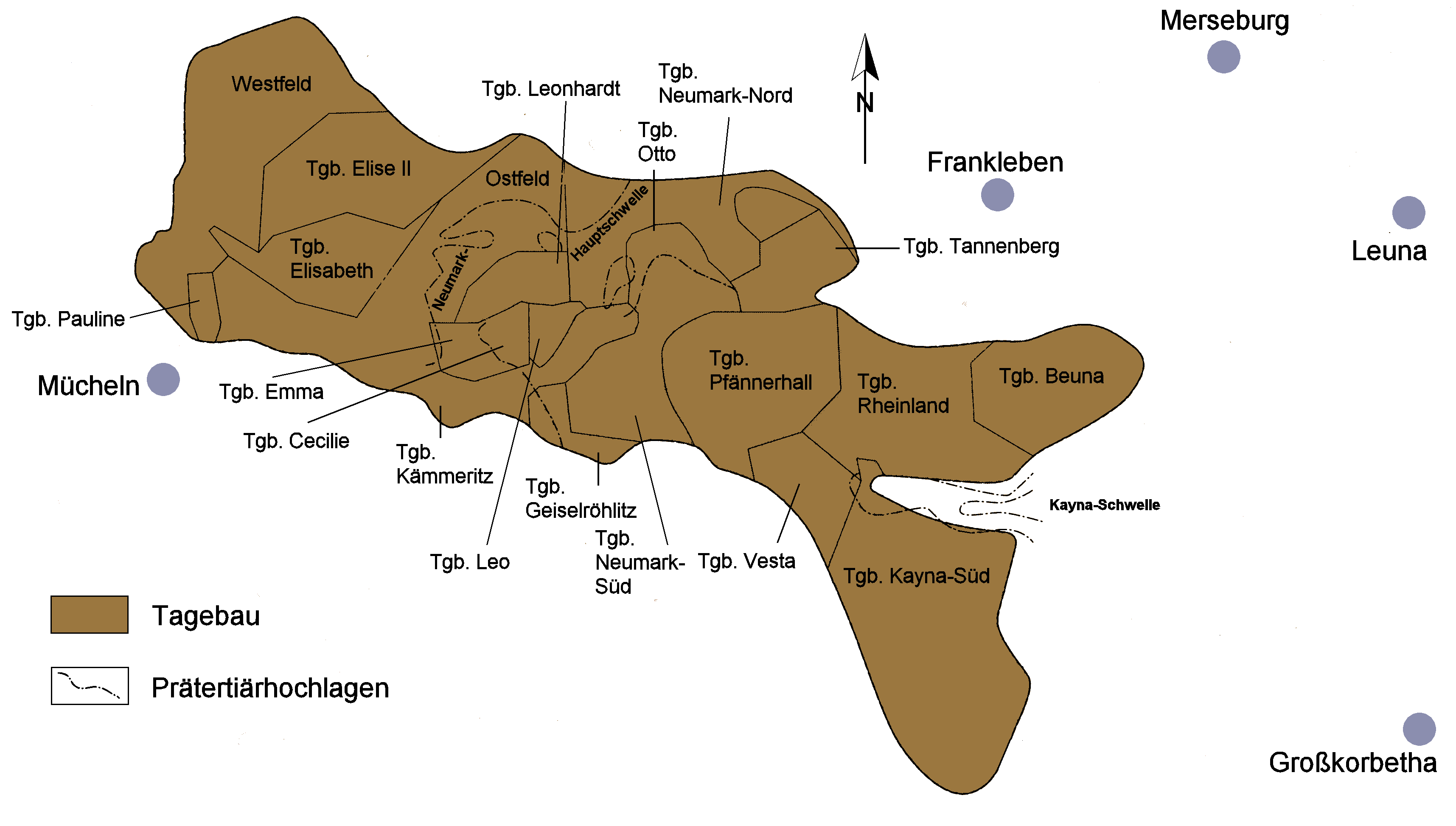
Geiseltal open-cast mining area, mapped at the 2 m thickness limit of the lignite

The Geiseltal, a peripheral area of the Central German Lignite Mining Area, is located about 20 km south of Halle (Saale) and about 10 km southwest of Merseburg in Saxony-Anhalt. It extends over a length of 15 km from west-northwest to east-southeast and over a width of 0.5 to 5 km. In the north it borders on the flat Merseburg red sandstone plateau, in the south on the Müchelner shell limestone plateau of the Querfurt-Freyburger Mulde. The River Geisel, which gives the valley its name, flows through the Geiseltal. It rises in St. Micheln near Mücheln from one of the largest springs in central Germany and drains after 19 km in Merseburgd via the Gotthardtsteiche into the Saale. Its catchment area is about 35 km^{2}.

Originally, the area of the Geiseltal was relatively flat, which can be explained by the Buntsandsteins spreading west of the Saale. In general, the heights in the eastern Geiseltal were around 100 meters above sea level, rising to 150 meters and more towards the west. However, the intensive activity of open-cast lignite minings has seriously altered the landscape, especially in the last 150 years, and in addition to the destruction of several villages, has also led to the shaping of an area of around 90 km^{2} with the course of the Geisel river being shifted several times to the south. As a result of the renaturation of the later abandoned open-cast mines, larger lakes were created, which currently dominate the entire Geisel valley. The Südfeldsee and Runstedter See were created in the eastern and south-eastern Geiseltal as early as the second half of the 20th century, while in the western part the Geiseltalsee, one of the largest artificial lakes in Central Europe, was only completed in 2011. Today, the western and eastern Geiseltal valleys are separated by a tipping dam up to 140 m high, which, in addition to the current course of the Geisel River, also carries important transportation routes such as roads and railways.

== Geology ==
=== Geological subsoil ===
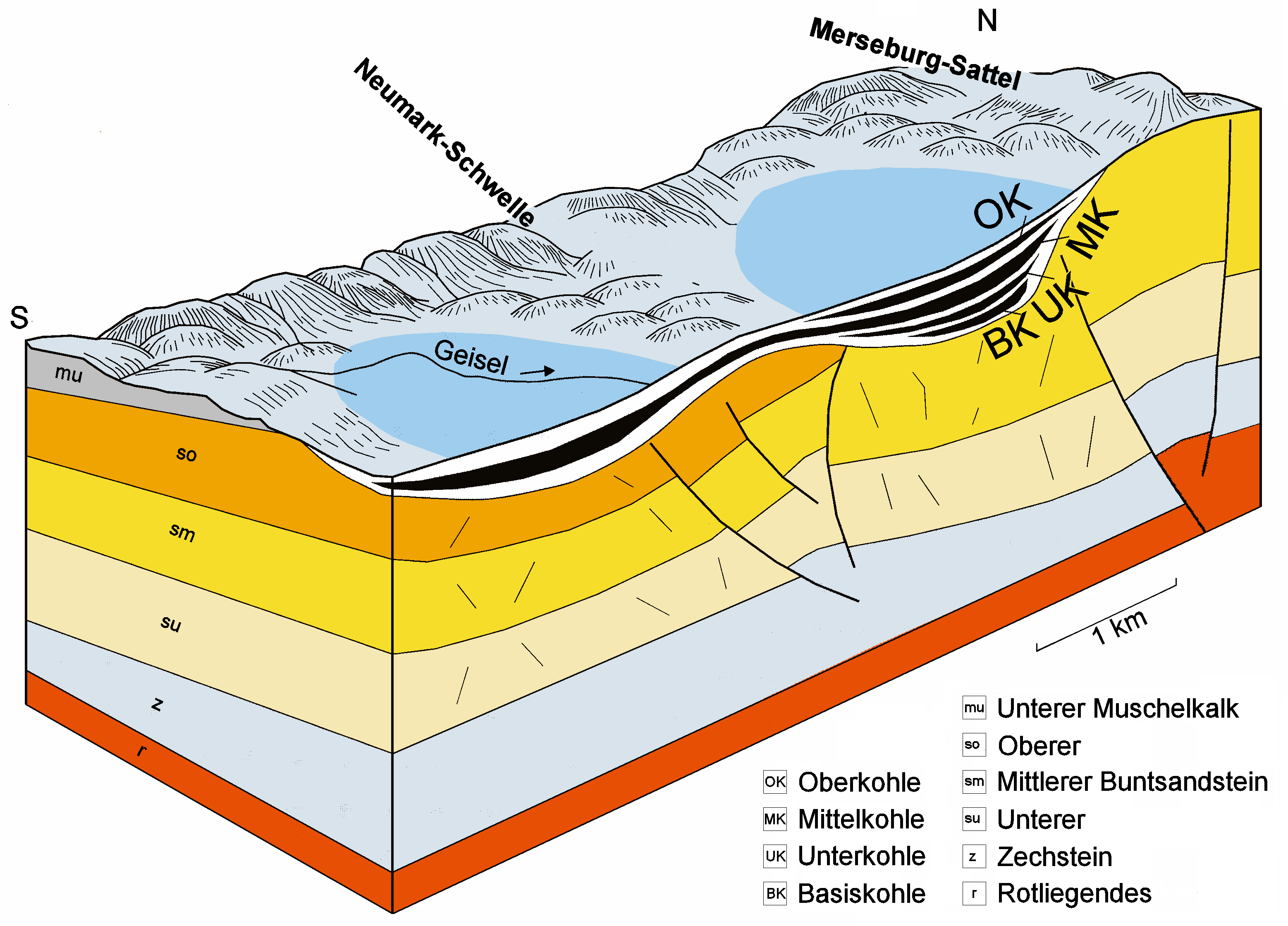
Geological structure of the Geiseltal in the block image

The geology of the Geiseltal has been well investigated since the beginning of the 20th century during preliminary investigations to determine lignite storage conditions with deep boreholes. These were only 100 m apart in individual sections. The geological subsurface consists largely of Rotliegengendes and Zechstein deposits from the Permian geological period, around 300 to 240 million years ago. These deposits are overlain by sediments from the Buntsandstein (251 to 243 million years ago), where the lower and middle Buntsandstein predominate. In the southern part of the Geiseltal, towards the Mücheln shell limestone plateau, however, there are also remnants of the Upper Buntsandstein, in which the shell limestone deposits are found at the edges of the valley. The following Hiatus comprises the Keuper and Cretaceous of a period of around 140 million years.

The Geiseltal heutige is increasingly present in its geography. The Neumark main threshold, a rise of the Buntsandstein, divides it into two roughly equal-sized areas, the western and eastern Geiseltal. Secondary and subordinate basins are the Elise basin, the Elisabeth basin, the Wernsdorf basin and others; pre-Tertiary thresholds are the Kayna threshold and the eastern threshold. Geologically, the Geiseltal represents a subsidence structure whose formation has not yet been fully clarified, but which was controlled by several processes. It is possible that in the Palaeogene the leaching of the Zechstein salt combined with the chemical weathering of the shell limestone (subrosion) led to mass loss in the subsoil, which resulted in the subsidence of the overlying layers and the formation of the basin. The salt movement (halokinesis) in particular was associated with tectonic forces in the subsurface, resulting from plate tectonics, which also caused the folding of the Alps during the Cretaceous/Tertiary turn about 65 million years ago. This led to an increase in pressure on the originally flat Zechstein Sea, which then flowed sideways. In the northern area of the Geiseltal, seismic measurements have identified tectonic faults, the so-called Geiseltal-Nordrand-Störung (Geiseltal northern edge fault), which in some places reaches a jump height of up to 200 m in the upper layers (red sandstone).

=== Paleogene deposits ===
The entire deposits of the Palaeogene reach a thickness of up to around 200 m in the Geiseltal, but are largely limited to the Eocene (56 to 34 million years ago). These Tertiary sediments are initiated by clays and silts as well as partly gröberclastic material. The thickness of the predominantly finely layered to flaky lignite is around 30 to 80 m, but can reach over 120 m in places. In general, the Geiseltal lignite is divided into four main seams, the Lower Coal, Middle Coal (differentiated into Lower and Upper Middle Coal) and Upper Coal, but also has a local Basiskohle in the northern Geiseltal. With the exception of the base coal, all seams are subdivided into further seam sections. The individual seams reach a thickness of 10 to partly 60 m. They are interrupted by sand-silty sedimentary sections (the so-called main middle), which represent guiding horizons and serve to differentiate the seams. In the southern Geiseltal in the open-cast mine Cecilie, however, there was a partially unbroken transition from the middle coal to the upper coal. The extent of the individual coal seams varies from north to south and is linked to the halokinetic and subrosive subsidence of the subsoil. subsidence of the subsurface, but it generally continues further south with the increasing stratigraphic altitude of the seams. Only the Upper Coal is formed throughout the Geiseltal. The very rich Eocene fossil community originates mainly from the Lower Coal and Middle Coal.

=== Supporting layers ===
The overburden in the Geiseltal consists of up to 50 m thick deposits of the Middle Pleistocene and Late Pleistocene (0.78 to 0.012 million years ago). The oldest layers, spared from erosion, were formed as ground moraine by the inland ice of the Elster glacial period (400,000 to 335,000 years ago). In the Holstein Warm Period (335,000 to 320,000 years ago), the Unstrut river shifted its course as far as the Geiseltal and created the so-called Körbisdorf Terrace. The inland ice of the Saale Cold Period (320,000 to 128,000 years ago) only passed over the Geiseltal during the first advance, known in Central Germany as the "Zeitz Phase" and in Northern Germany as the "Drenthe I Phase" or "Main Drenthe".

The retreat of the inland glacier of the Saale glacial period led to the formation of drainless and mostly water-filled depressions, particularly in the north-eastern part of the Geiseltal, in the former open-cast mining field Neumark-Nord, through mollisol diapirism, in which predominantly limnic sediments were deposited. Between 1986 and 2008, the individual lake basins were the focus of interdisciplinary scientific research, the results of which were published in numerous publications. The largest, around 600 m long and 400 m wide Neumark-Nord 1 basin contained the remains of a rich large mammal fauna, including complete skeletons of the European forest elephant, aurochs, bison, fallow deer and various rhinoceross (forest rhinoceros, steppe rhinoceros), but also cave lions and spotted hyenas. The large mammal fauna of the smaller Neumark-Nord 2 basin was similar in principle to that of the larger basin, but with a few exceptions it was small and disarticulated. A large number of flint artifacts of Middle Palaeolithic humans were discovered in the shore areas of both basins. humans have been discovered. There is still no agreement on the age position. According to various pollen analyses, the Warm Period sediments of the two basins show a succession typical of the Eemian Warm Period (128,000 to 115,000 years ago) typical succession. For the Neumark-Nord 2 basin, an Eemian classification is supported by further analyses, such as paleomagnetics and radiometric age dating. In contrast, the interglacial sediments of the Neumark-Nord 1 basin could also have been deposited during an "intrasaalean" interglacial period. This is indicated by the botanical remains, such as the macroflora with the extremely rich relicts of a steppe-oak-mixed forest characterized by the Tatar maple, or individual fossils of small mammals, including the dwarf forest mouse Apodemus maastrichtensis. The ostracod fauna as well as other findings do not suggest an Eneolithic age.

The entire layer package is overlaid unconformity by stream gravels of the Geisel and several meters thick loess of the last cold period (Weichselian Cold Period; 115,000 to 11,600 years ago), which carries the black earth soil. Various ice wedge horizons are embedded in the loess, which refer to the particularly cold phases of the Last Glacial Period. The late section of the Weichselian Cold Period is more extensively exposed at the southern edge of the Geiseltal (former Mücheln open-cast mine). Here, four warm-cold phase cycles could be detected in a small depression, of which the two upper ones with the Bölling Interstadial (in the classical sense) and the Older Dryas Period as well as the Alleröd Interstadial and the Younger Dryas Period. A thin layer of Laacher See tuff has been preserved in the most recent warmer sequence (Alleröd Interstadial) just below the recent soil horizon as a relict of a volcanic eruption around 13,000 years ago.

== Fossil sites ==
=== Preservation and distribution of finds ===
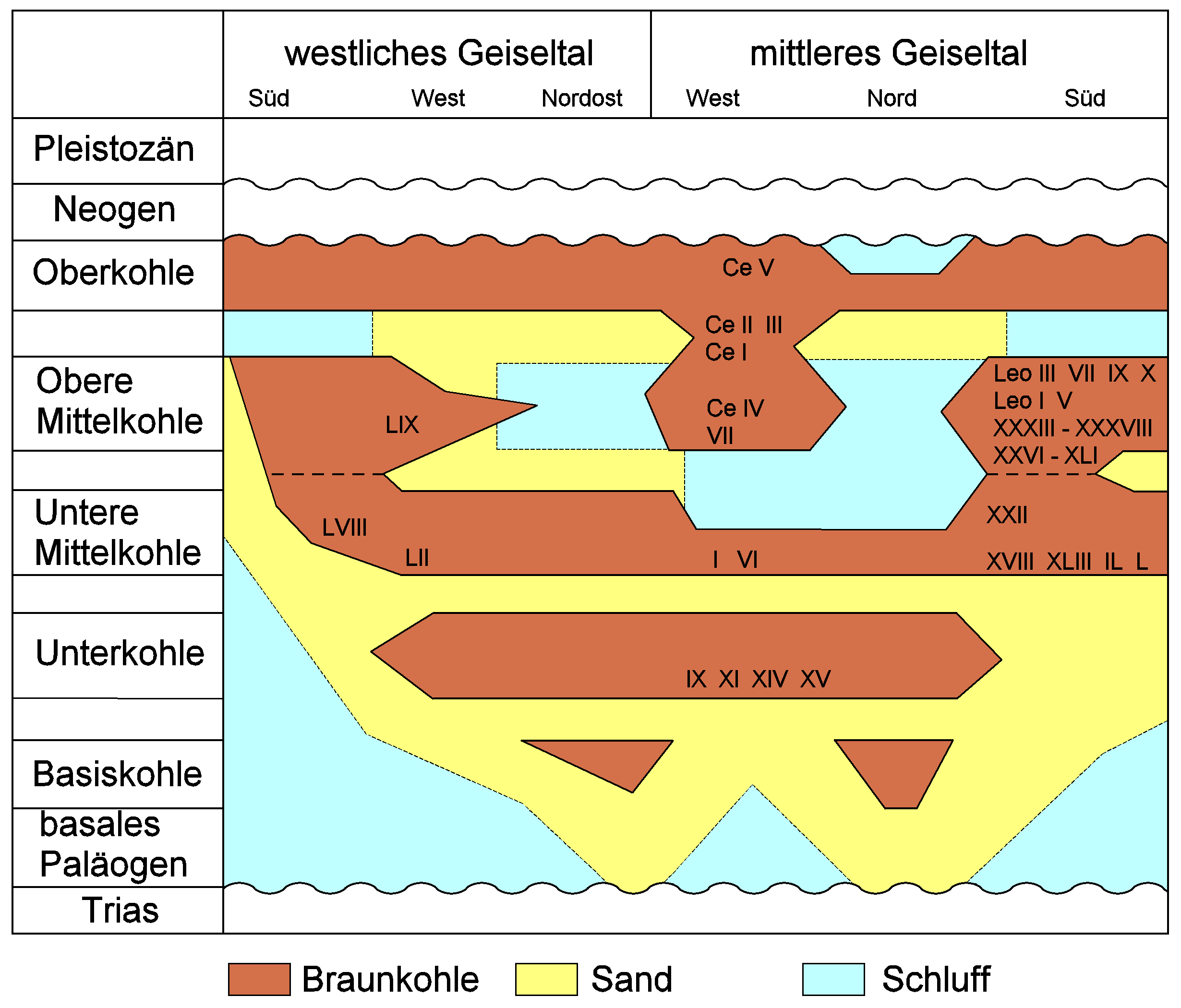
Stratigraphic distribution of the vertebrate sites

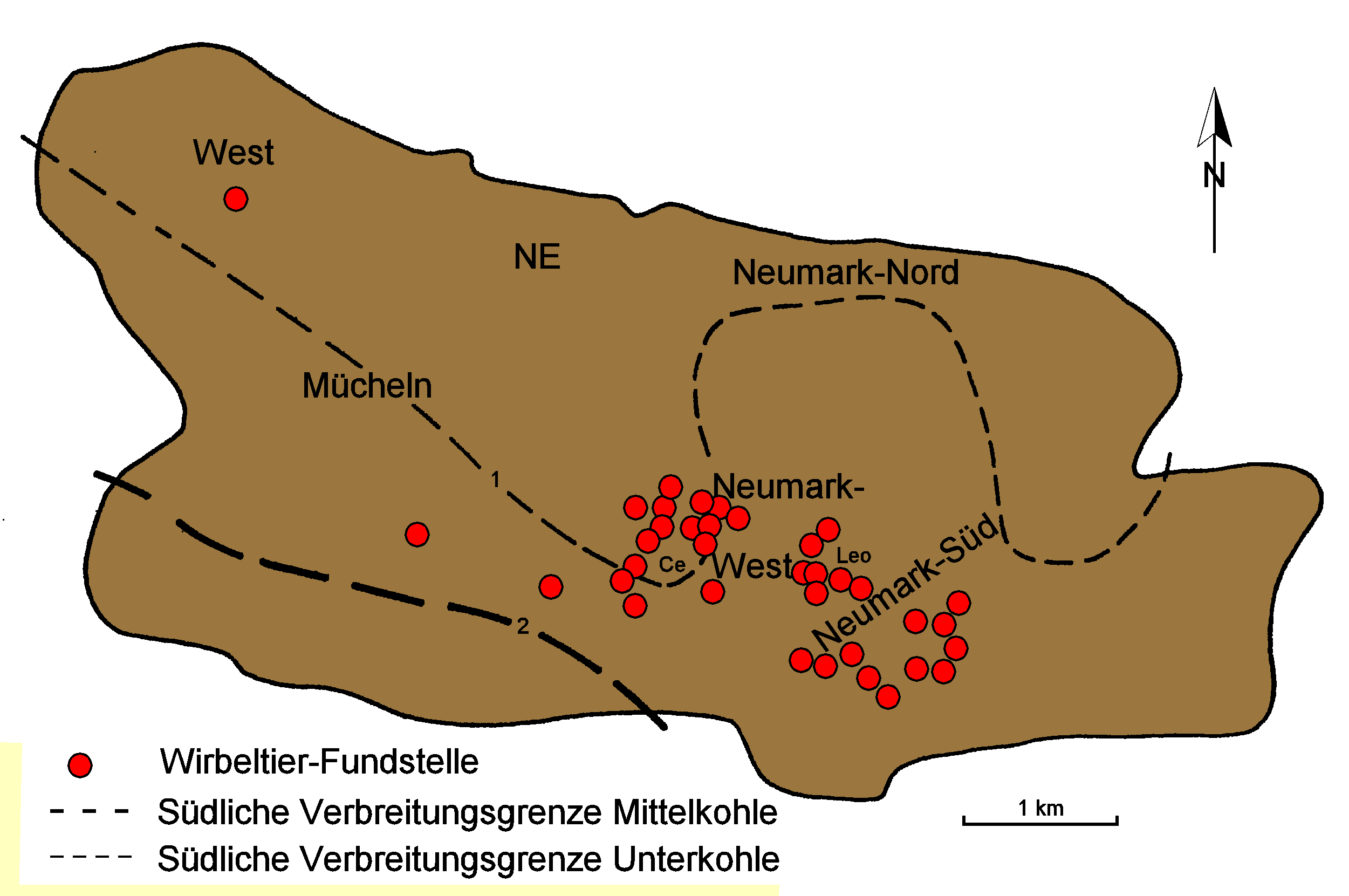
Spatial distribution of vertebrate sites in the western and central Geisel valley

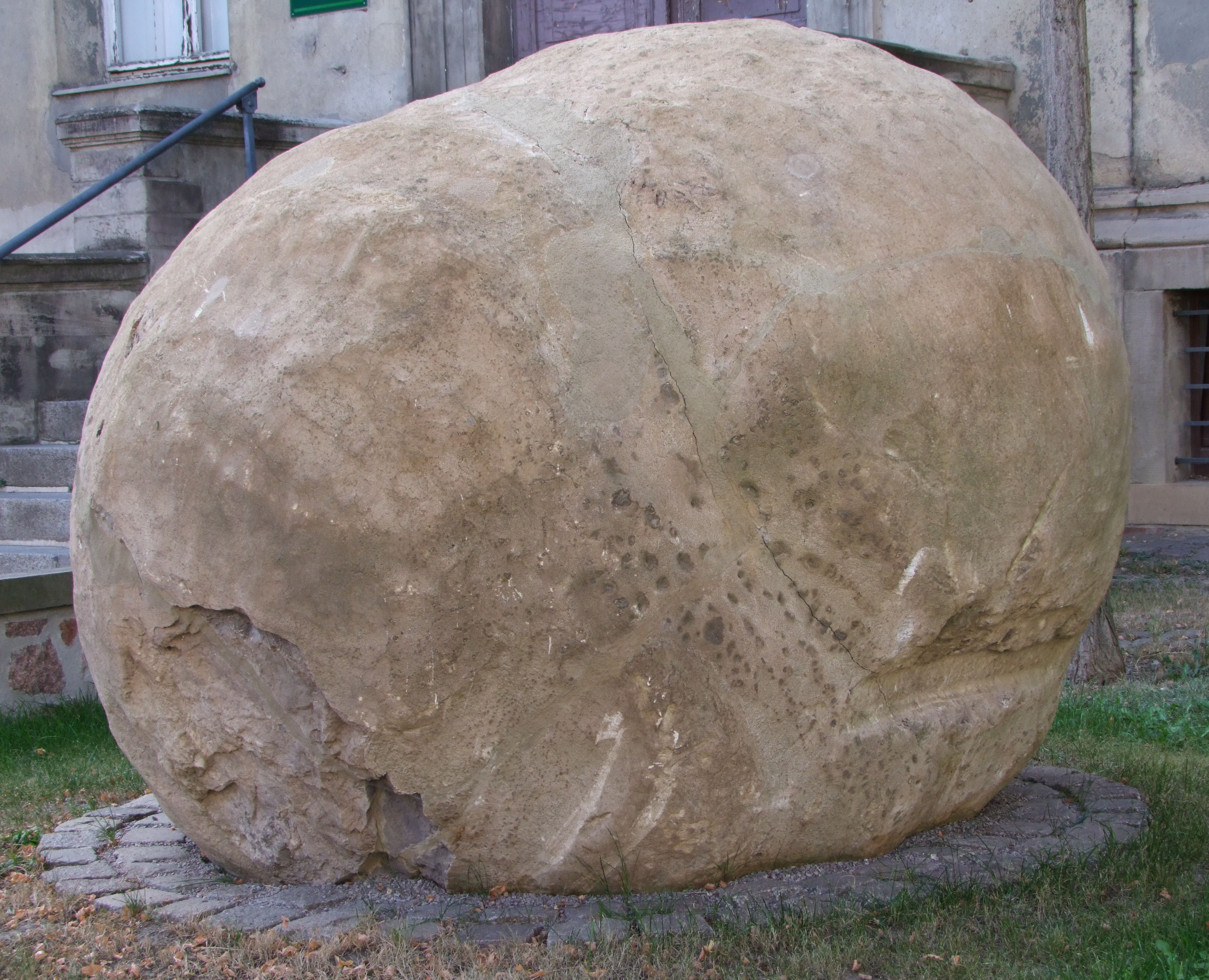
Calcite sphere from the Geiseltal, set up in the garden of the Zoological Institute of the Martin Luther University Halle-Wittenberg; diameter 1.5 m, weight 5 t; formed by the penetration of calcareous water into the fossil-bearing coal

While plants and sometimes also invertebrates were found in all areas of the coal seams, vertebrates were bound to certain, more restricted sites. A total of more than 80 sites are known, 36 of which contain a significant number of vertebrate remains. These are mainly located in the Lower and Middle Coal, with around twice as many sites in the Middle Coal as in the Lower Coal. The upper coal contained only one relevant site and was otherwise largely fossil-free, which is partly due to the diagenetic changes during the Pleistocene under the influence of periglacial conditions. No fossilization could be detected in the basal coal. The spatial distribution of vertebrate fossil sites reflects the conditions for the preservation of finds, which were not present to the same extent in the entire Geiseltal. As a result, the majority of vertebrate sites, especially those with complete skeletons or soft parts, are concentrated in the central and southern Geiseltal, mainly near the Neumark main sill and in the adjacent Wernsdorfer Kessel to the east. The majority of the sites are therefore located in the open-cast mines Cecilie, Leo, Geiselröhlitz and Pfännerhall and are spread over an area of around 20 km^{2}. The quality of the fossil preservation decreases sharply to the north and west and partly to the east.

Vertebrate finds from lignites are very rare worldwide and have not yet been observed outside the Geiseltal in Central Europe. There are several reasons for the good fossil preservation in the Geiseltal. Mainly responsible are calcareous waters from the neighboring Triassic rocks, here predominantly shell limestone, which penetrated from the south or southwest from the area of the Querfurt-Freyburg Mulde during the formation of the lignite as circulating groundwater. These largely neutralized the decomposing properties of the humic acid of the fens in the former Geiseltal, but were, as can be seen from the finds, only locally effective. To a lesser extent, silicic acid also ensured good preservation of the fossils. A further influence on the preservation of the animal cadavers was the flooding of the former land surface, which was quite frequent in the Middle Coal Age and led to a rapid covering of the cadavers with sediments. Both the fossil remains and the lignite are 50% saturated with water when fresh and dissolve very quickly as they dry out, flaking and then disintegrating into dust. For this reason, the Lacquer film method was developed at the beginning of the 1930s for the targeted recovery of fossils, especially in the Geiseltal.

=== Finding types ===
In addition to individual and stray finds and occasional finds from drill cores, a total of three different types of vertebrate sites can be distinguished, some of which also occur in different combinations:

- Collapse funnel

These are circular, partly doline-like depressions with a symmetrical structure. They were formed syngenetically by leaching of gypsum in the underlying red sandstone (subrosion). As a rule, the collapse funnels can be recognized by their marginal layer faults and the resulting tectonic displacements resulting from this. Two types of funnel can be distinguished: the actual collapse funnel with diameters of 12 to 18 m and the subsidence funnel, which is smaller and shallower and reaches diameters of 3 to 8 m. The depressions were largely filled with water when they were created and formed small ponds and pools. The often steep edges formed natural traps for vertebrates, creating a natural burrowing community. The sedimentary overlay at the bottom of the pond created digested sludge and the anaerobic conditions prevailing there led to the formation of fossils.

- Cadaver fields

These are more extensive areas with fossil finds that extend over areas of up to 80 × 100 m. The fossils are usually found in large depressions and are generally covered by a 20 to 30 cm thin layer of charcoal. They are remnants of the former land surface and bog areas flooded by inundation and are mainly concentrated in the central Geisel valley.

- Streams

The cadaver fields resembled the streams, some of which came from the western shell limestone area and ran through the Geiseltal and flowed into one of the local basins. These are channel-like depressions in the coal, in which mostly cross-layered quartz sands were deposited. Only in the deeper basin areas were clayey sediments were found, which indicates a reduction in the flow force of the streams. The fossil finds are concentrated in the former bank areas. Most of the animals died there, as in the collapse funnels on the sometimes steep slopes, but were also victims of numerous predators living there. Collapse funnels and corpse fields are the most common, the stream courses are rather rare and were only discovered in the mid-1950s. The state of preservation of the vertebrate fossils in the corpse fields and in the streams is similar and reveals certain rearrangements due to water movement combined with skeletal decay. In the collapse funnels, complete skeletal remains were only found in the central and deepest parts, where the carcasses were completely covered with water. Towards the edges of the funnels, clear disarticulations of the skeletons can also be observed. The significant finds of fossilized soft tissue come only from the collapse funnels and the corpse fields.

== Finds ==
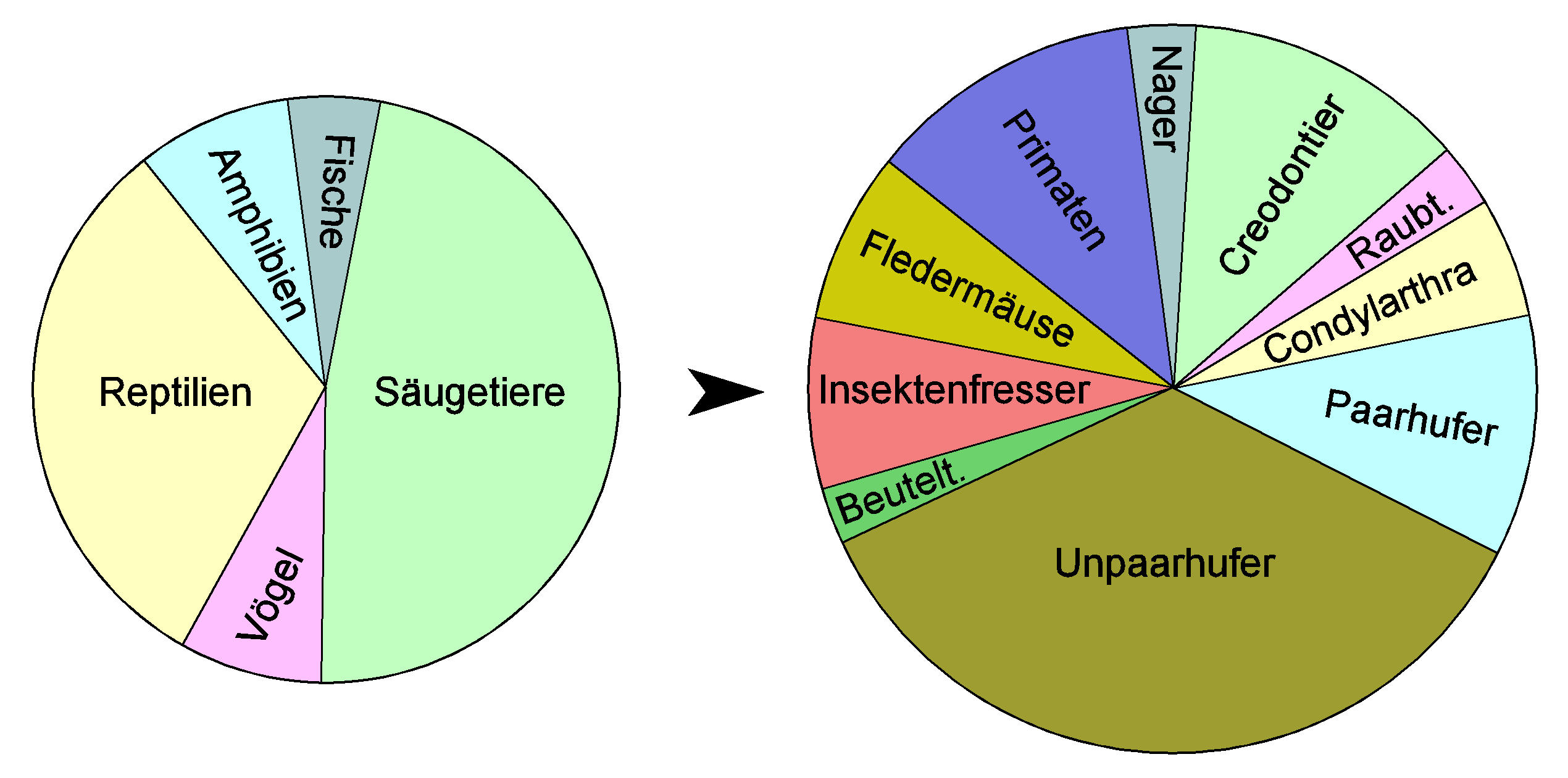
Left: Distribution of vertebrate finds in the Geiseltal among the vertebrate groups - Right: Detailed section of the find proportions within the mammals

The fossil material from the lignite of the Geiseltal is very rich and includes the remains of plants and animals. The floristic material is present in the form of micro and macro remains. The fauna is represented by invertebrates and vertebrates, of the latter there are also a large number of complete skeletons. The good preservation of soft tissue, which is very poorly preserved in fossil form, should be emphasized. Despite the good preservation conditions, a large proportion of the fossils are not autochthonous, but were transported during fossilization, caused by the flow of water. This applies mainly to the finds from the mortuary fields and the streams. The depositional conditions of the fossils can generally be regarded as parautochthonous to partly allochthonous. The exact number of finds is unclear, the inventory of the former Geiseltalmuseum of the University of Halle comprises around 50,000 objects, most of which are vertebrates. During the intensive excavation phase of the 1960s, the collection grew by more than 5830 objects per year. An analysis of more than 10,000 vertebrate remains revealed that almost half of them were mammals (5,000 pieces), while reptiles were the second most frequently represented with 2,000 finds. The scientific evaluation of the entire fossil record is still ongoing, and numerous fossil creatures were first described on the basis of the material found in the Geiseltal. The vertebrates alone comprise more than 120 taxa.

=== Flora ===
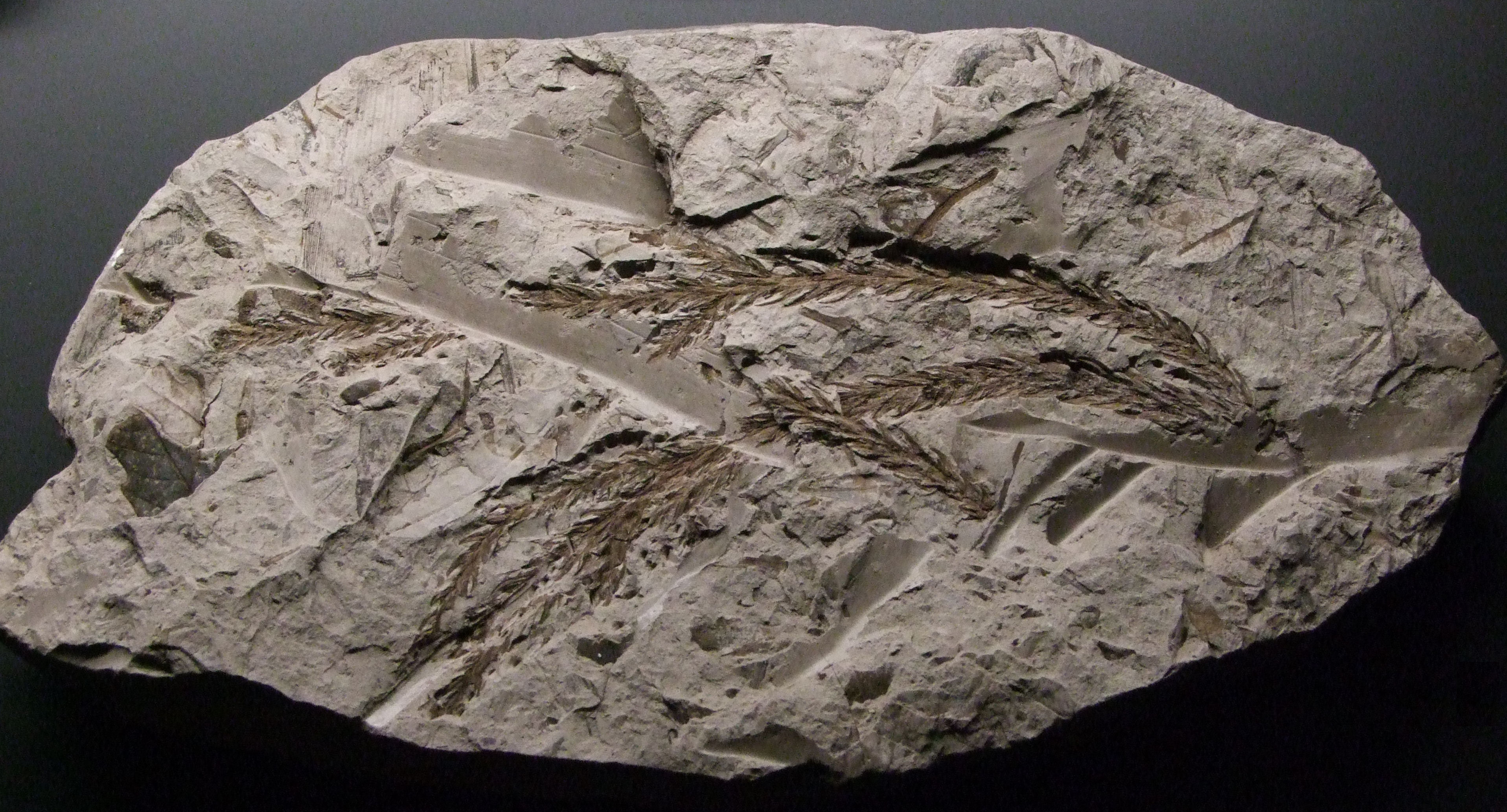
Branch and leaf fragments of Doliostrobus from the Geiseltal

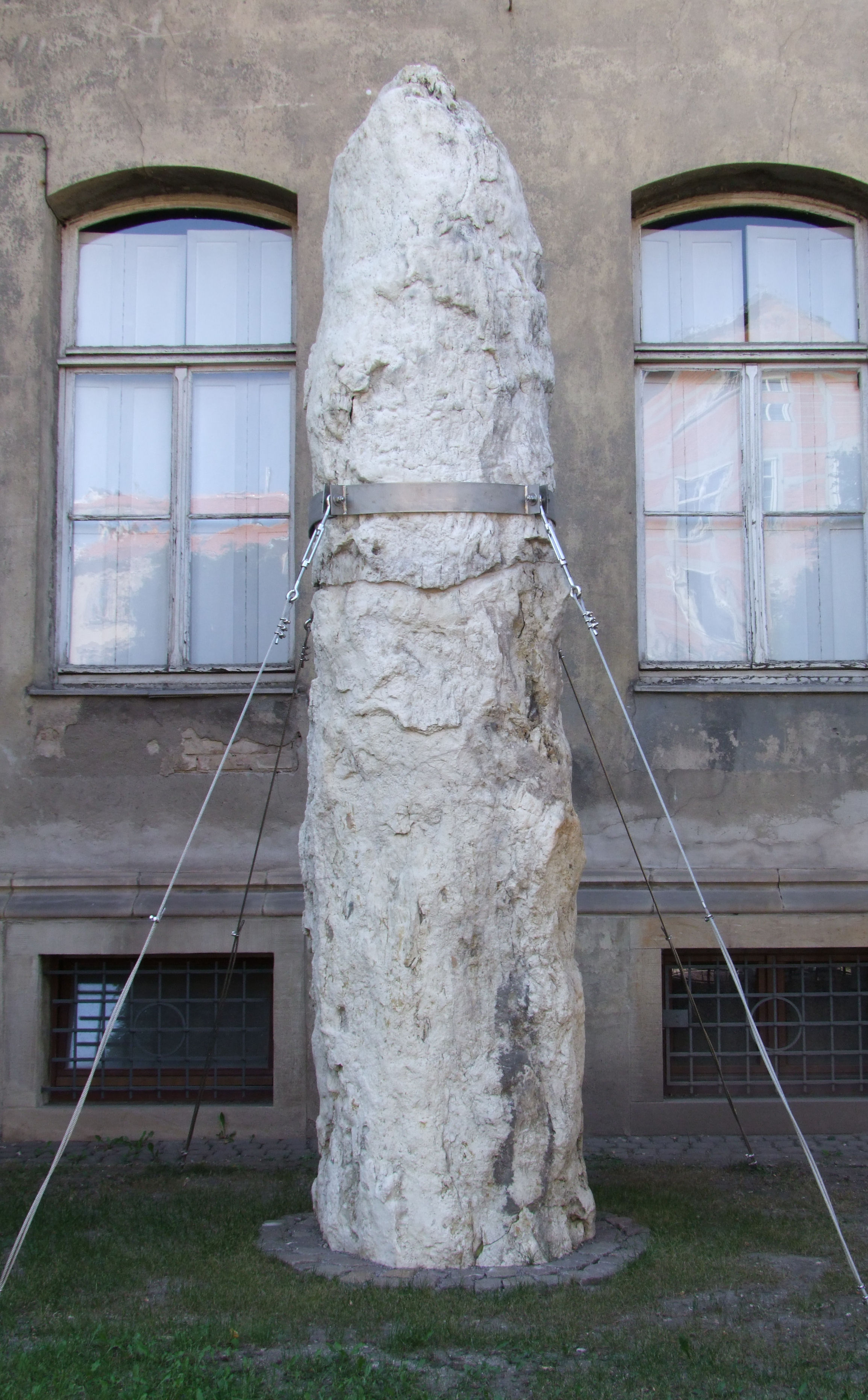
Sintered tree trunk from the Geiseltal, set up in the garden of the Zoological Institute of the Martin Luther University Halle-Wittenberg; original height 4.7 m, largest trunk diameter 0.9 m, split into two parts

Among the quite common plant remains are pollen and spores as microflora, which alone occupy more than 100 stratigraphically relevant taxa, the macro-remains are particularly important. These include leaves, twigs, branches, bark and stems as well as fruits, seeds and inflorescences. At least 18 families can be identified from the fruits and seeds alone. In total, more than two dozen families with around 40 genera are known. In addition to algae, mosses, primordial ferns - some of these in concentrated enrichments of ribbed ferns and climbing ferns, among others - predominantly remains of the more highly developed seed plants occur. The gymnosperms are represented by palm ferns, some with whole fronds, and conifers with cones and branches. The latter include pines and redwoods, some of which occur in clusters. The latter are classified in the cypress family, of which the extinct genus Doliostrobus has also survived. The remains of the angiosperms are much more extensive. Here the dicotyledons are the largest group with around 20 families. These include laurel and beech families. The latter sometimes also form dense leaf layers, such as in the genus Dryophyllum. Gale shrubs, predominantly fern myrtle, are very common. Plant remains from lime family, Icacinaceae and myrtle family, of which Rhodomyrtophyllum is dominant, are found in large numbers. The long narrow leaves of Apocynophyllum from the dog poison family are also characteristic. Several up to 44 cm long bark remains with the so-called "monkey hair", fossilized milky sap tubes, attached to them are also assigned to this plant family. Monocotyledons have less diversity. Among these, mainly the Arecaceae occur in large numbers and are represented by Sabal and Phoenicites, among others. However, the frequently transmitted palm tribes cannot be precisely classified taxonomically. Other representatives of the monocotyledons have also been described, for example from the lily family and the screw tree family.

=== Fauna ===
==== Invertebrates ====
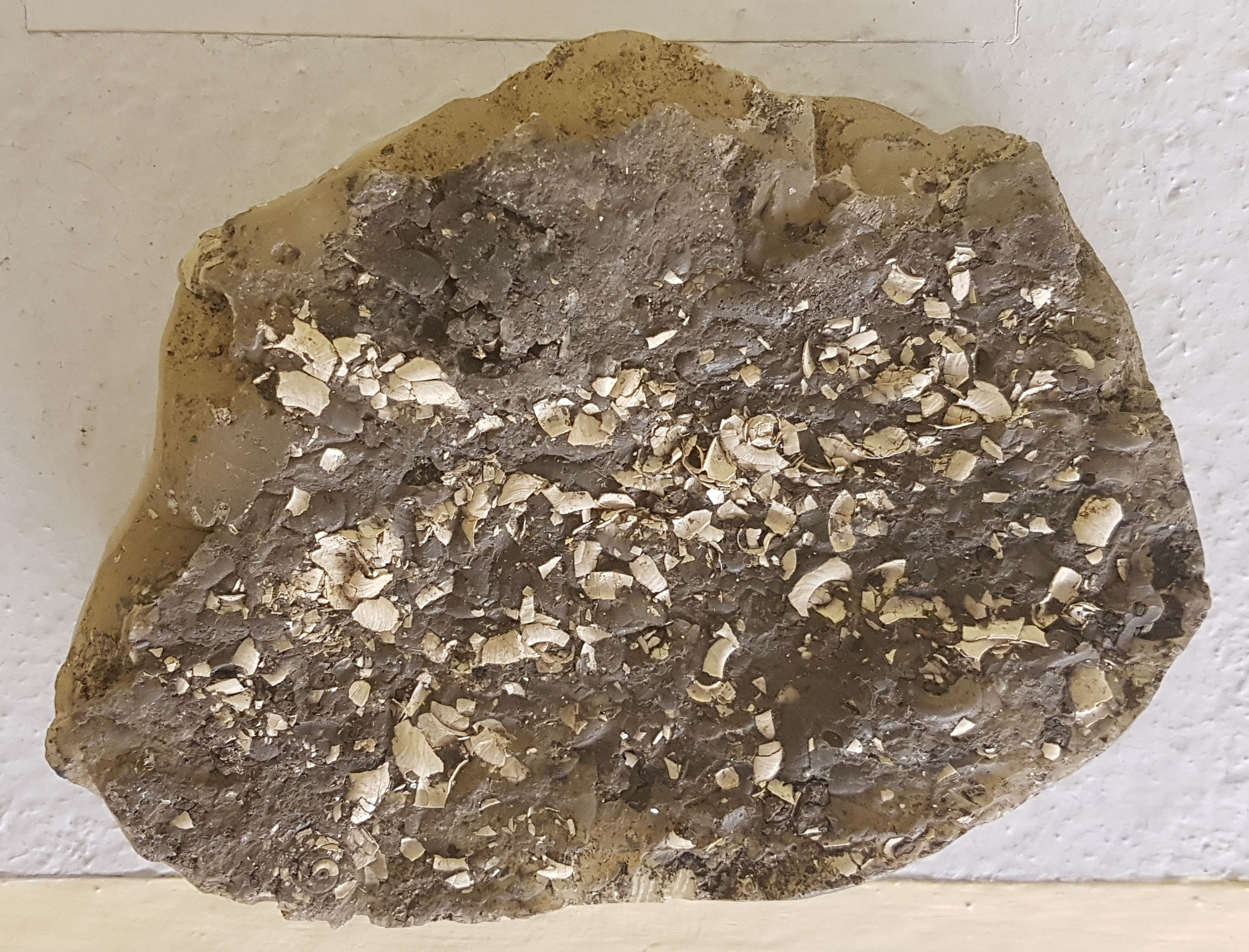
Gastropod shill from the Geisel Valley

Invertebrates were first mentioned in 1913 and are very numerous. Molluscs, which include mussels and snails and which sometimes occurred in masses, are represented by around 20 genera and are ideal for the reconstruction of small biotopes. The same applies to the ostracods, the bivalve crustaceans with 10 genera. Further finds of arthropods are assigned to the decapod crustaceans. However, these are extremely rare with only 15 specimens and usually only the remains of the armor are preserved. The most frequently found invertebrates are insects. The beetles dominate here, with jewel beetles accounting for 28%. The genus Psiloptera is recorded with eight species, but belongs to the black beetle group. There are also several other beetle families, including the leaf-horned beetles, the hook beetles and the leaf beetles. Since the insects are preserved almost exclusively with their backs, the sometimes magnificent coloration of the animals has been preserved, but the exact species assignment cannot be made with certainty in all cases. Flying insects such as mayflies and dragonflies have also been detected, but damselflies only via tiny egg clutches measuring just a few millimetres. These are deposited in double rows on the leaf of an angiosperm and are similar to those left by pond damselflies today ("lestid" type). The group of flying insects also includes fan-winged insects, whereby a larva of Pseudococcites from the excretions of a beetle, only 140 μm long and 90 μm wide, forms one of the few examples of this developmental stage of the insect group worldwide. Very small numbers of spiders and millipedes occur. The discovery of a stringworm of the genus Gordius parasitizing on insects is a special feature, as such parasites are extremely rare in the fossil record.

==== Fish and amphibians ====
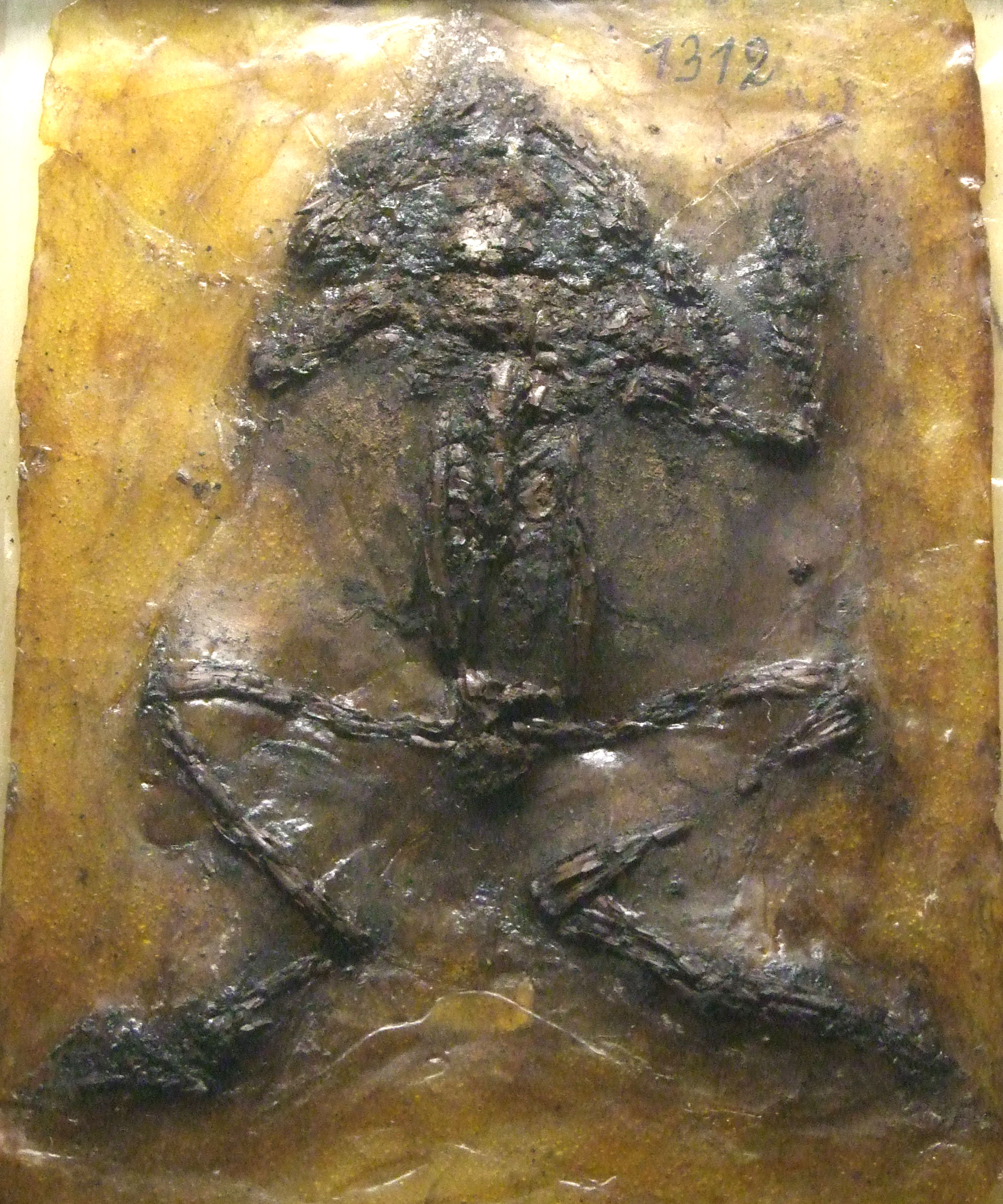
Skeleton of Eopelobates from the Geiseltal

The fish fauna is very extensive with around 2000 specimens, including many complete skeletal individuals, but comprises a total of only 5 families with just as many genera. The most common are the bony fishes, represented by Thaumaturus and Palaeoesox. The former belongs to the salmonid family, the latter to the pike-like family. Another bony fish is Anthracoperca, a relative of the perches. With Cyclurus, there is also a representative of the bony ganoids.

Among the amphibians, the frogs and salamanders are the most important, with 200 to 300 specimens of each, plus numerous individual bones. The articulated skeletons of the frogs are all very fragile, with larger skeletal elements close to the body prevailing over smaller ones far from the body. The remains also include a large number of tadpoles. Quite common is Eopelobates from the family of European shovel-footed toads, to which today's spadefoot toad also belongs. Like the latter, Eopelobates lived largely terrestrially. In contrast, the equally common Palaeobatinopsis was an aquatic animal from the Palaeobatrachidae family, a now extinct group of frogs. Further fossil material may well belong to a closely related representative. Of the newts, Palaeoproteus is particularly numerous. It is an amphibious olm that grew up to 25 cm long and had very short limbs. Tylototriton occurs less frequently. This genus, known as crocodile newts, is still found in East and Southeast Asia and its representatives belong to the true salamanders.

==== Reptiles and birds ====
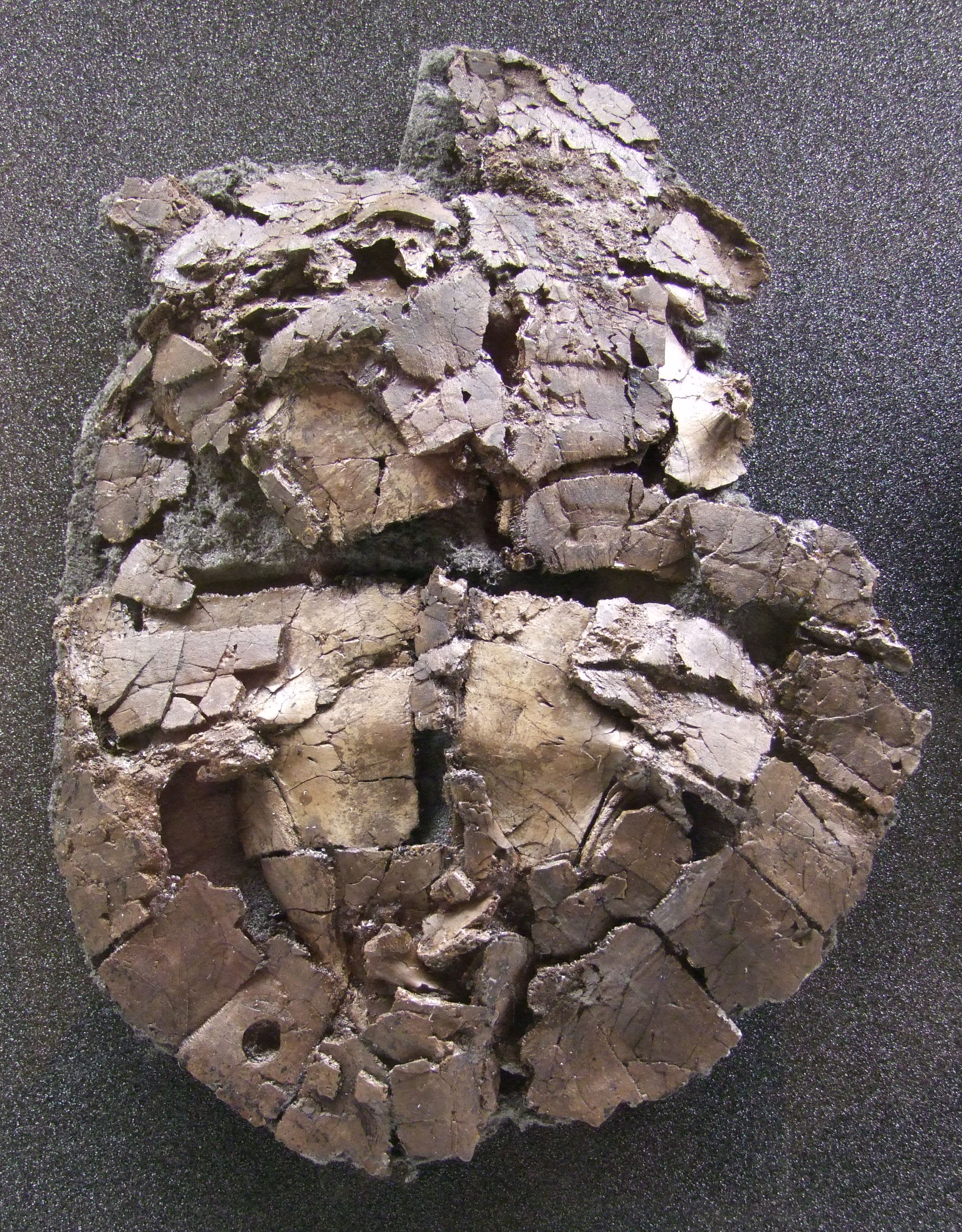
Fossils from Borkenia from the Geisel Valley

Reptiles are among the most common fossil finds and can be assigned to almost a dozen families with around 20 genera. Due to the humid environment, numerous turtles have survived, especially their shell remains, which are usually flattened by the sediment load. All turtles known from the Geiseltal can be counted among the Halsberger turtles and include around 500 specimens. These include the genus Geiselemys from the group of Old World swamp turtles with a well ossified shell around 18 cm long. Similar dimensions were reached by Borkenia, which used to belong to the genus Chrysemys and was thus closely related to the ornamental turtles. At the other end of the size range is Geochelone (also known as Barnesia), a land tortoise, which had an average shell length of 50 to 60 cm, possibly up to 120 cm. Another, rather smaller form is Hummelemys, however, their exact systematic position is disputed. Palaeoamyda is one of the soft-shelled turtles, whose shell reached a length of around 30 cm. The animal was well adapted to a life in fresh water.

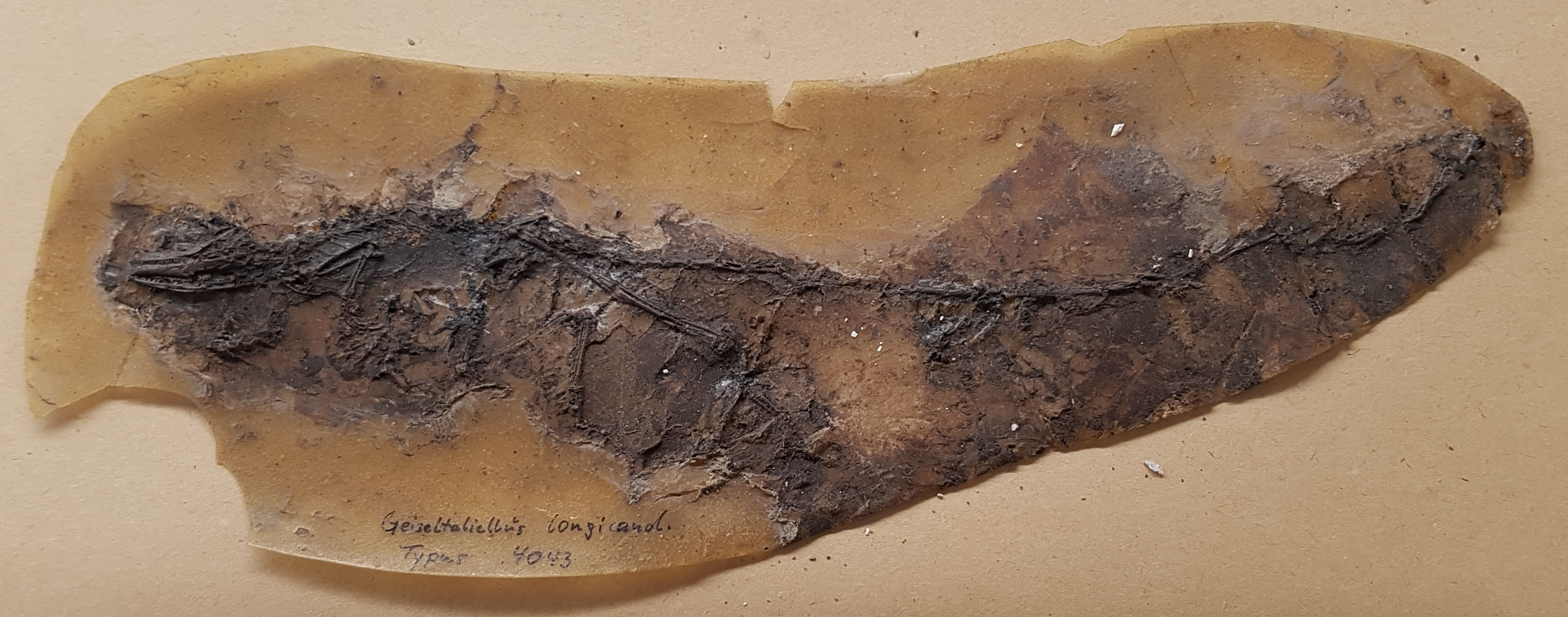
Skeleton of Geiseltaliellus from the Middle Eocene of the Geisel Valley

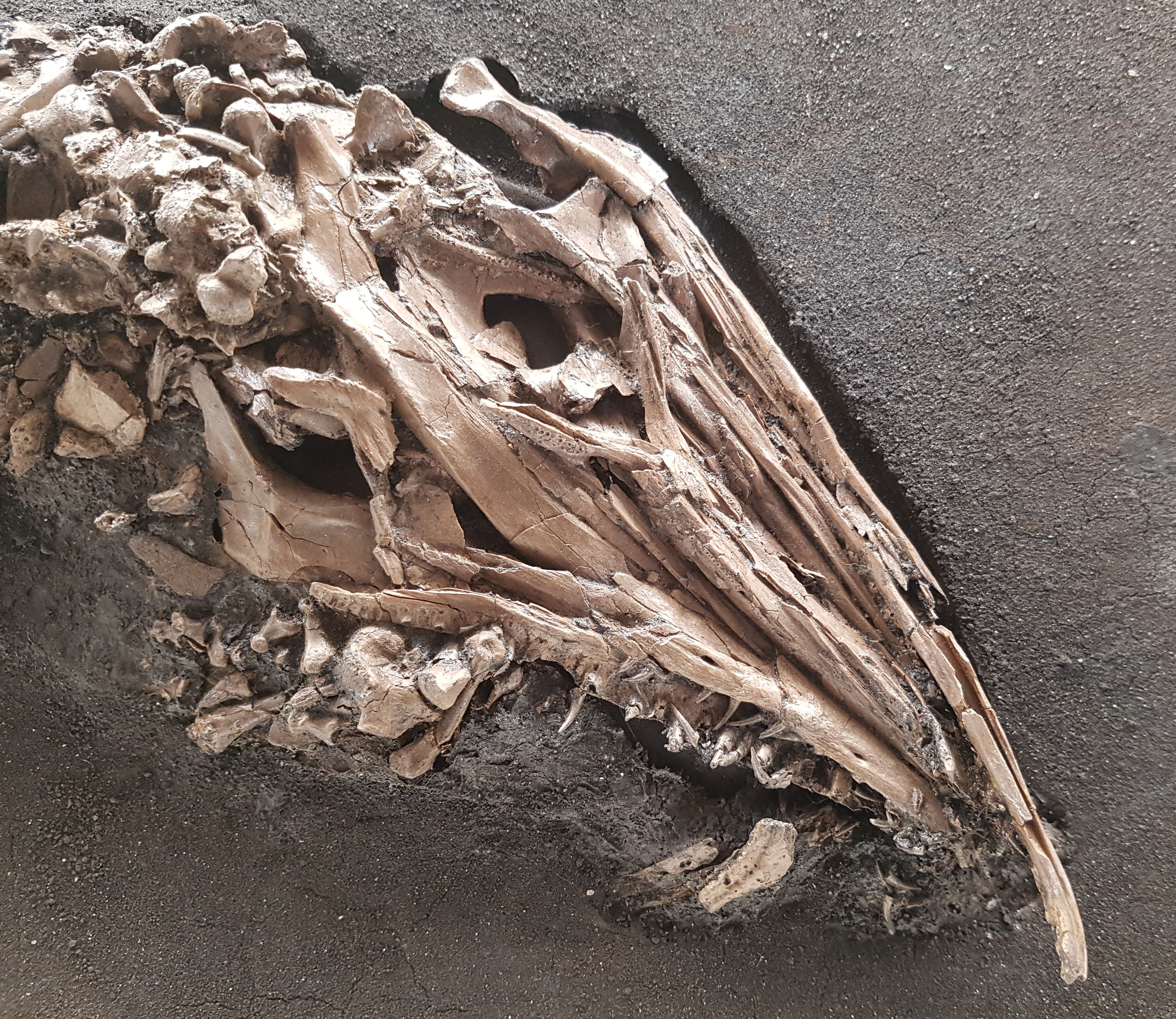
Skull of Eosaniwa from the Geisel Valley

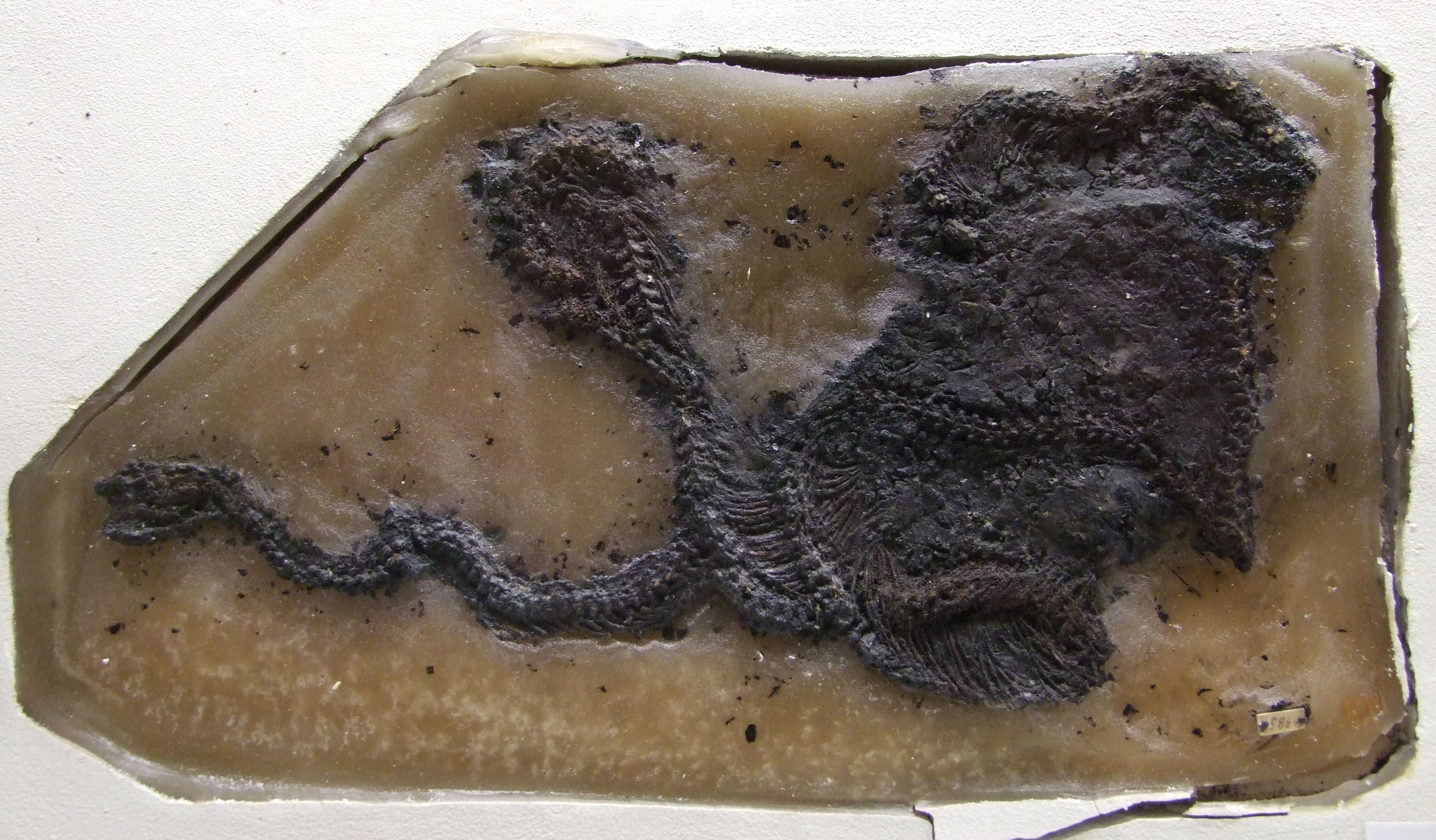
Skeleton of Paleryx from the Geiseltal

Scale crawlers are recorded with almost 300 complete specimens plus numerous individual finds. Eolacerta was quite a large animal, reaching a length of 60 cm, with several complete skeletons and additional moulting remains. It was originally counted among the real lizards, but some special anatomical characteristics, however, led to the establishment of the independent family of the Eolacertidae, which in turn forms the sister group of the true lizards. A largely complete but heavily fragmented skull is the only evidence of geckos to date. It belongs to the genus Geiseleptes, for which in turn a closer relationship to today's European leaf-fingered gecko can be considered. The iguanas include Geiseltaliellus, a slightly built lizard with an extremely long tail and fine skin scales, which was probably an arboreal dweller. Due to the short forelimbs, it is assumed that Geiseltaliellus, like today's basilisks, could occasionally only move on its hind legs. Ophisauriscus can in turn be assigned to the slithers and is related to the glass slithers. The snake-like animals still had rudimentary forelimbs and hind limbs. More than 20 finds have been documented, ranging in condition from almost complete skeletons to disarticulated individual finds and remnants of skin armor. The individual bone plates of the former scales differ markedly in shape and ornamentation from today's forms. Only rarely do relatives of today's monitor lizards occur. A poorly preserved partial skeleton of Eosaniwa has a 19 cm long skull, making this lizard one of the largest in the Geiseltal. A good 60 complete specimens can be counted among the snakes, including two genera of giant snakes from the Boa family. Paleryx was up to 2.3 m long, a total of 243 vertebrae could be recognized in a largely complete specimen. Furthermore, Palaeopython occurs, as well as some rolling snakes.

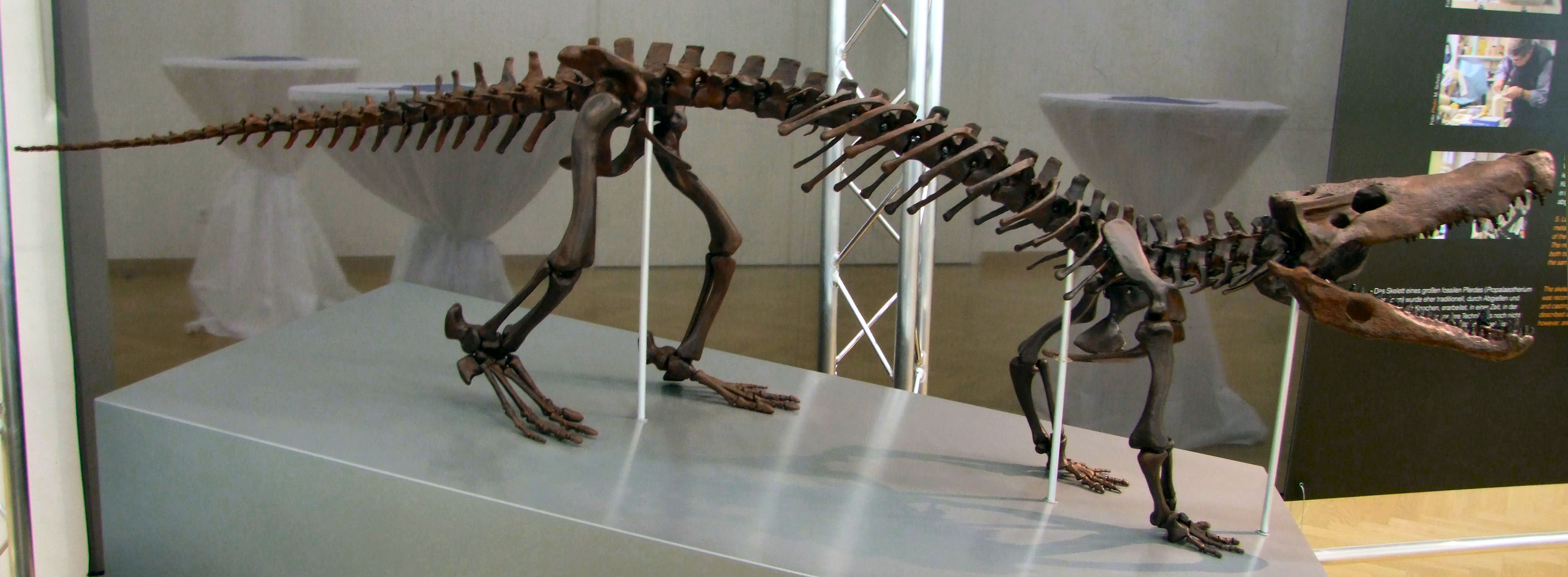
Skeletal reconstruction of Boverisuchus from the Geisel Valley

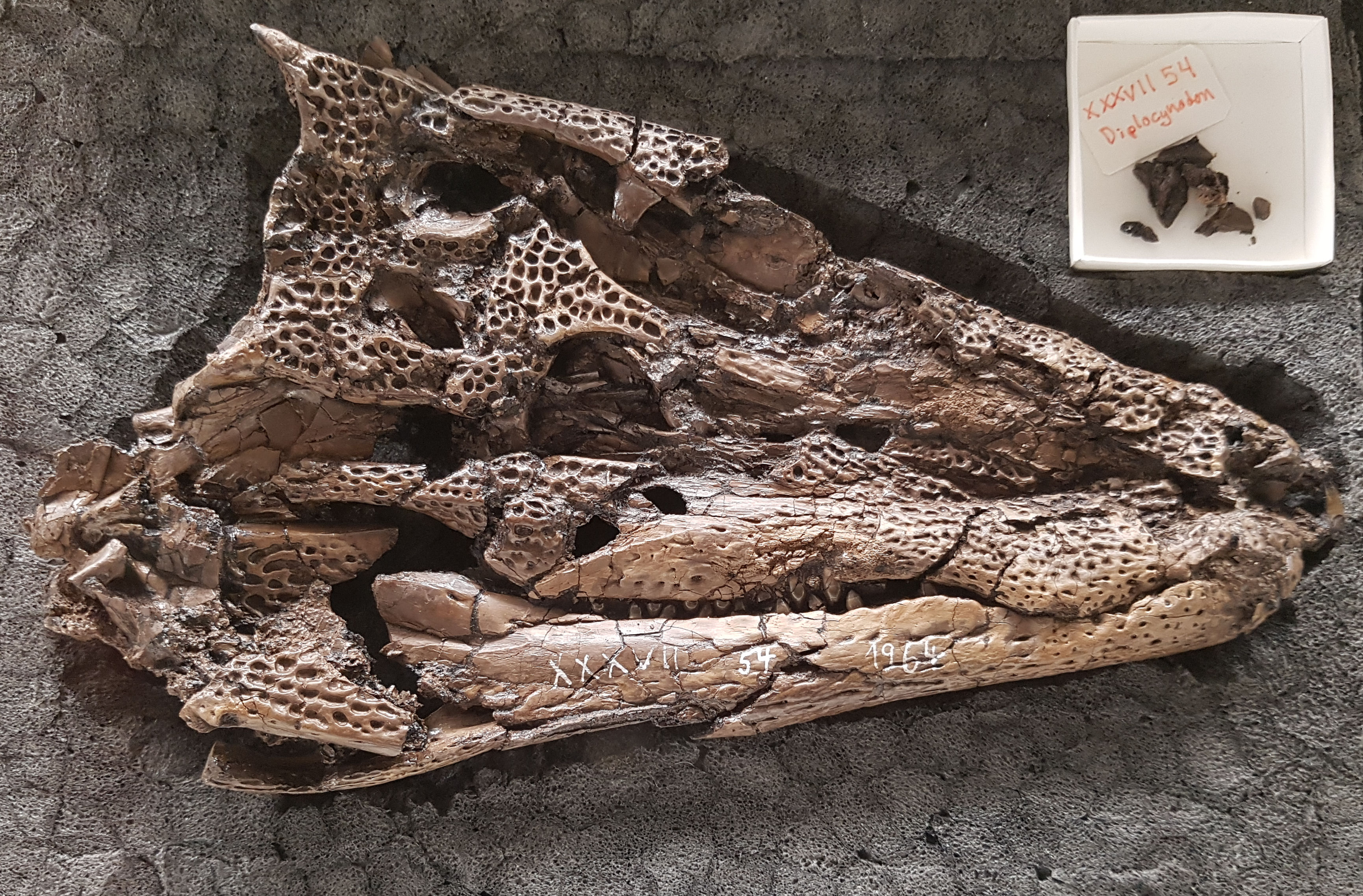
Skull of Diplocynodon from the Geiseltal

Crocodiles are also documented in large numbers, with around 120 complete skeletons, as well as countless isolated bones and teeth. The alligators are represented by Allognathosuchus, which was only about 0.8 m long and had a rather narrow snout. Diplocynodon is one of the most common forms of crocodile in the Geiseltal and is classified in the extinct group of the Diplocynodontidae. It lived in smaller bodies of water and reached a good 1.3 m in length. A special find includes an almost complete skeleton with bone armor and five eggs in close proximity; it is one of the world's rare examples of brood care in fossil crocodiles. At a good 1.7 m in length, Boverisuchus, a representative of the true crocodiles, is somewhat larger and also numerous. Due to its relatively long limbs and hoof-like spread end phalanges of the toes, this crocodile is assumed to have a more terrestrial lifestyle. The largest predator in the Geiseltal was Asiatosuchus with a body length of around 3 m. It was ecologically similar to today's Nile crocodile and preferred open waters. It is documented with several complete skeletons. In contrast, Bergisuchus appeared extremely rarely with only a few lower jaw fragments, a possibly also more land-dwelling animal that was small in stature at 1.5 m in length. In contrast to the other forms, Bergisuchus represents a primitive and more distant crocodilian relative from the Sebecosuchia group. Detailed investigations revealed that all crocodiles in the Geiseltal occupied different ecological niches. There are also fragments of crocodile eggs and numerous gastroliths (stomach stones), which prove the presence of crocodiles even without fossil preservation.

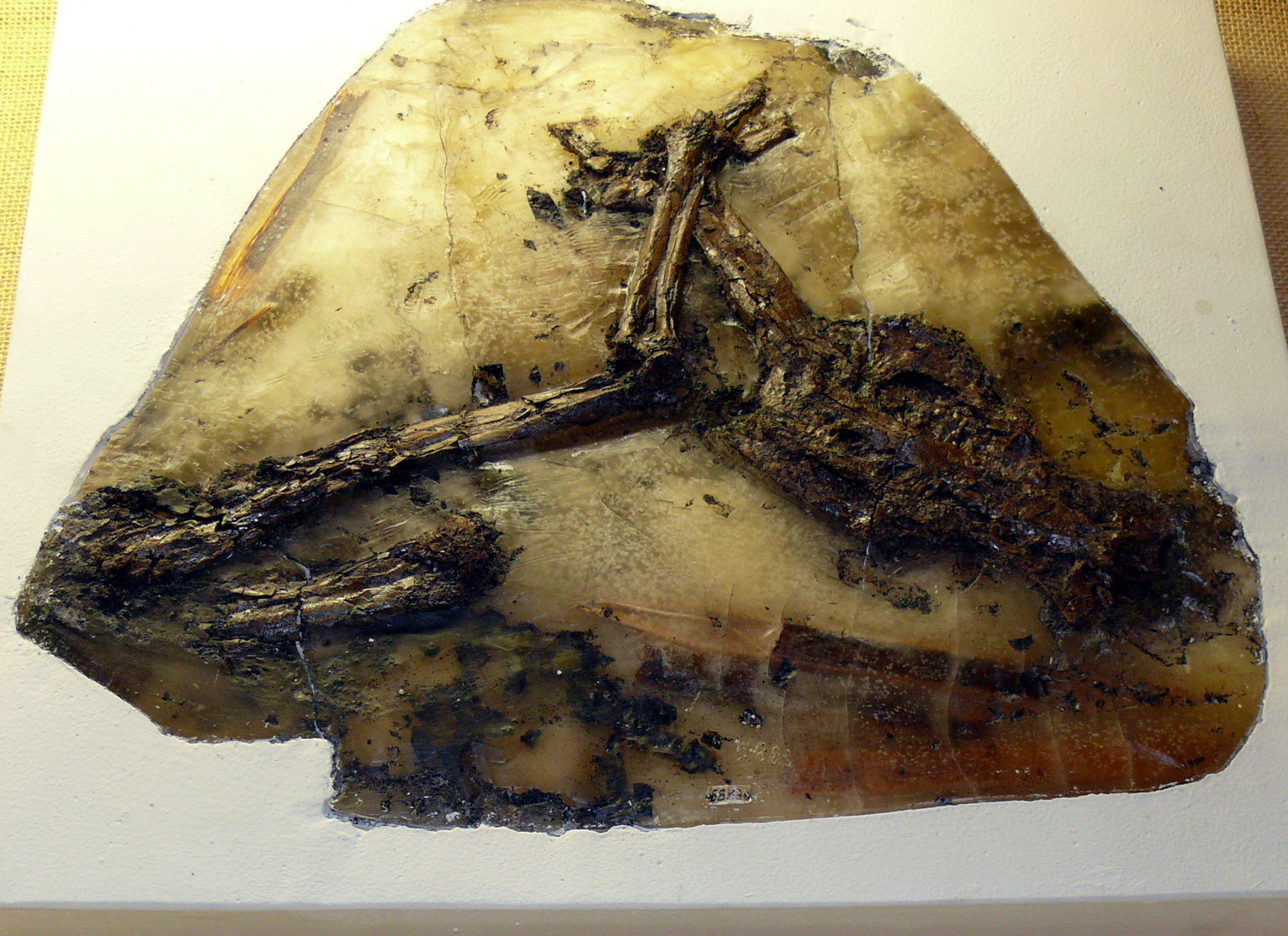
Skeletal remains of Strigogyps from the Geisel Valley

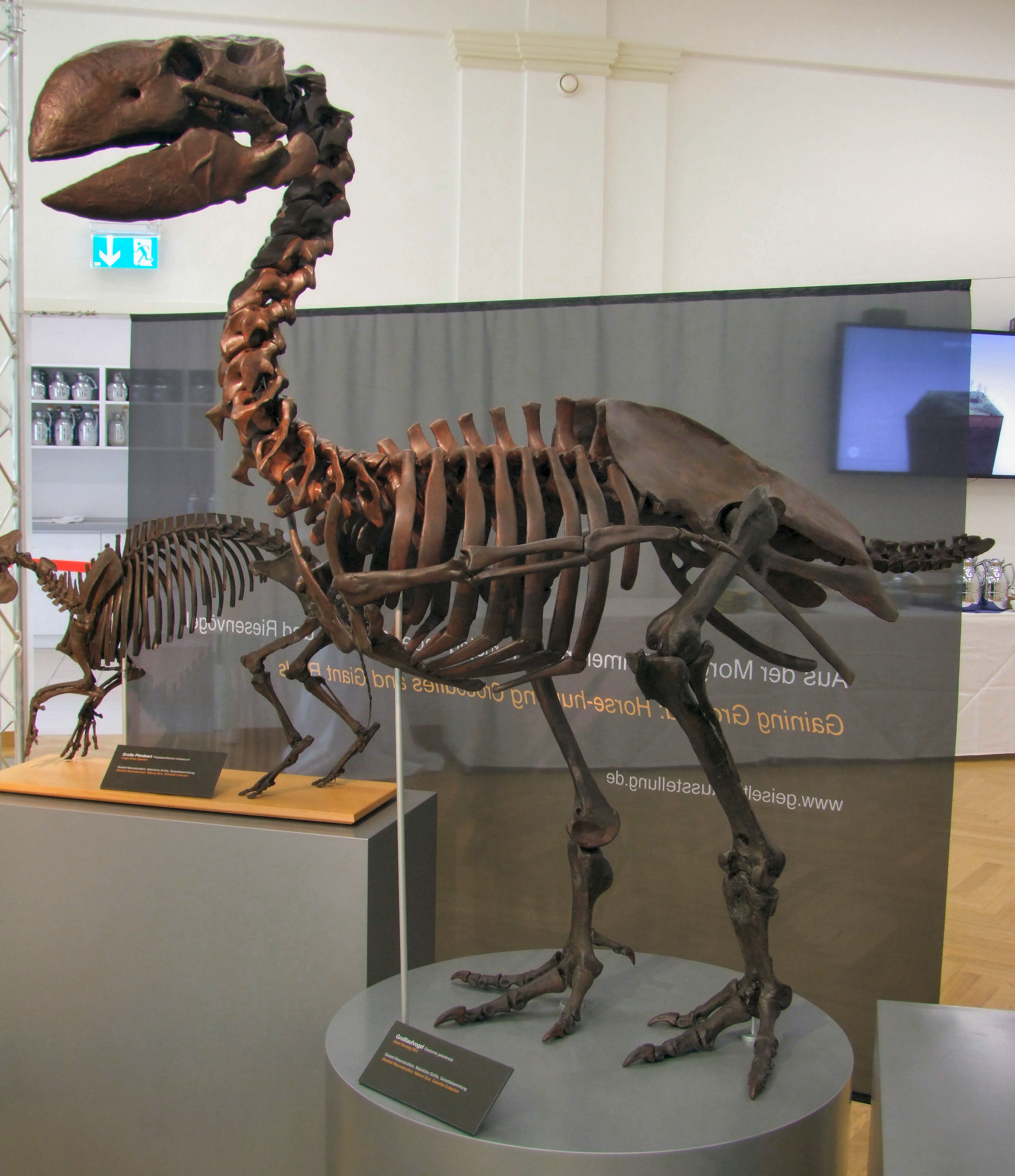
Skeletal reconstruction of Gastornis from the Geiseltal

Rather rare are the remains of birds, which have been identified with more than half a dozen families and a good twice as many identifiable genera. Complete skeletons were rarely observed; disarticulated parts and limb remains are more common. In the latter, the joint ends are sometimes missing. Part of the bird fauna is therefore interpreted as food remains of crocodiles and large snakes. In addition, the proportion of female animals is quite high, which can be recognized by the formation of medullary bones, a calcium-rich bone substance on the medullary tubes of the long bones, which is formed during the development of the eggs. The Palaeotis is a relatively small representative of the prehistoric jawed birds, which has been identified by its rear extremities and also by a partial skeleton. It was originally considered to be related to the bustard, but later considered to be in the ancestral line of today's Ostriches. In addition to the clear characteristics that Palaeotis has in common with the ancient pine birds, some characteristics of the hind legs are more reminiscent of today's cranes. With a total height of up to 1.8 m, Gastornis (also called Diatryma). There are over three dozen finds of this large ground-running bird, including several leg bones, but also skull remains and parts of the wings, which represent the largest collection of all sites in Europe. For a long time, Gastornis was considered a carnivore, but isotope analysiss on some bones from the Geiseltal showed that the bird was mainly vegetarian. Eocathartes was originally counted among the true carnivorous birds. This was supposed to represent the New World vultures in the Geiseltal and has been described on the basis of parts of the body skeleton as well as feathers. Furthermore, as a member of the hornbills, Geiseloceros had an exotic status. It was documented by leg bones and connected wing remains, on which the shimmering blue wing feathers are also recognizable. Today, both taxa are classified as Strigogyps from the family Ameghinornithidae, a group of larger ratites with closer relationships to the seriemas. A large foot bone, which can probably be attributed to Dynamopterus, also belongs to a similar relationship. There is also evidence of Aegialornis, a fossil sailor, via an upper arm bone. Smaller representatives of the birds are found with the mouse birds, of which several partial skeletons are available, such as those of Eoglaucidium and Selmes. With Plesiocathartes, identified by several limb bones, a fossil predecessor of today's courols living on Madagascar is documented. Individual bone elements also refer to Messelirrisor, which represents the hornbills and hops. In addition, hawk-like species were present, but these can be determined with less certainty, but possibly belong to Masillaraptor.

==== Mammals ====
The very extensive mammal fauna comprises remains from around two dozen families with more than 50 genera. Among the most primitive representatives are the marsupials, which are represented by Peratherium and Amphiperatherium. There are several skulls and lower jaw remains of Peratherium in particular. Both genera are ancestors of the South American opossum. Taxonomically difficult to classify is Microtarsioides, as a relatively complete skeleton has survived, but it comes from a juvenile animal.

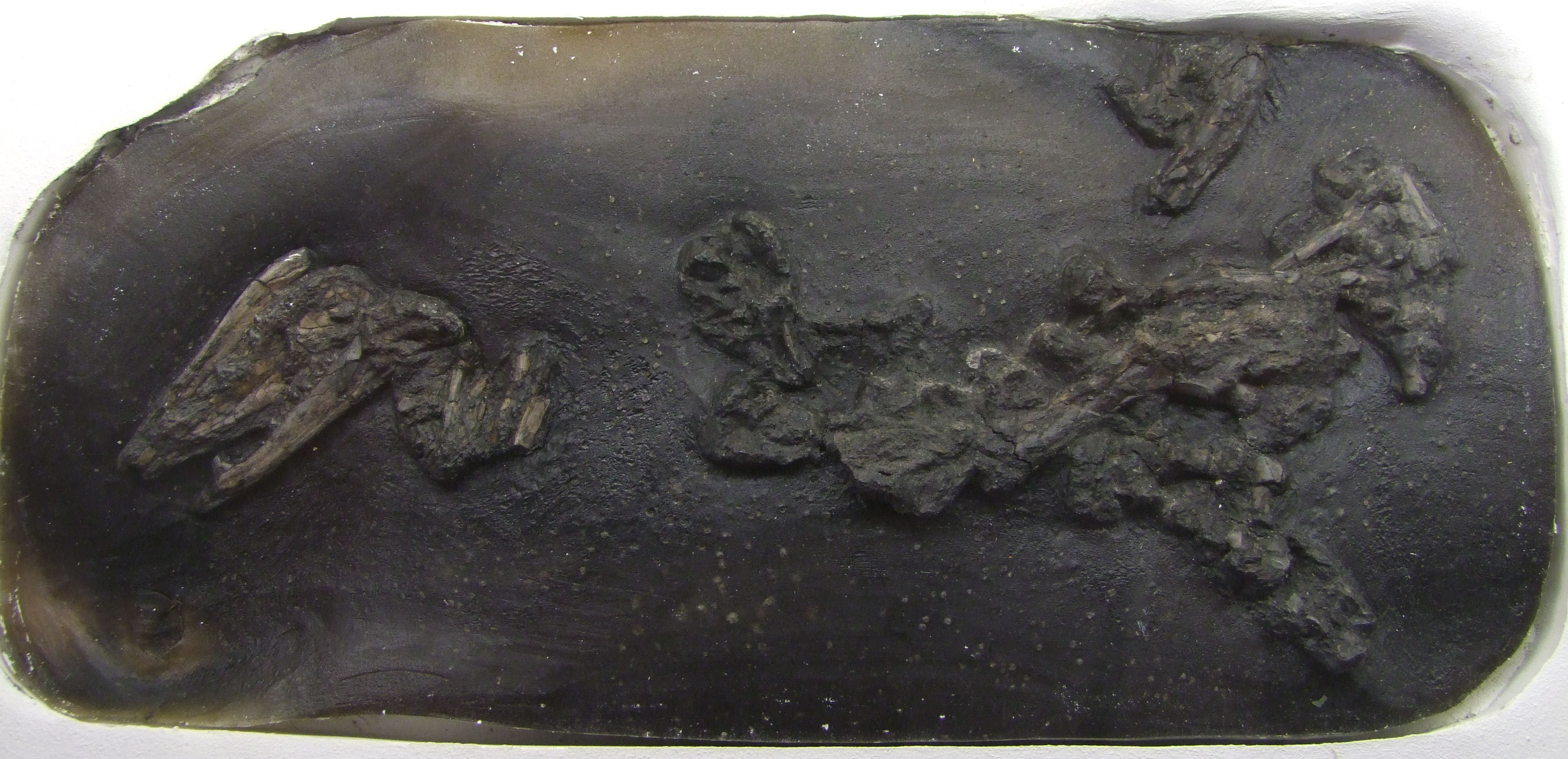
Skeleton of Leptictidium from the Geiseltal

The Higher mammals are considerably more extensive and diverse. A few characteristically strongly shaped long bones are assigned to Eurotamandua. Originally considered a member of today's anteaters, but according to further investigations it represents a basal form of the pangolins with a similar way of life. The Small Mammals include Heterohyus, an Apatemyid characterized by two elongated fingers and circular-arched incisors. The enlarged front teeth were used to gnaw tree bark, and the long fingers were used to drill into crevices and cracks for insects. In its way of life, Heterohyus thus resembled today's pinniped of Madagascar. A partial skeleton and a lower jaw of the Leptictidium have been found. This predatory animal moved by jumping on its hind legs, which indicates the basal position of the Leptictida, as this no longer occurs in modern insectivores. The rarely occurring Buxolestes, on the other hand, was a stocky, semi-aquatic animal from the Pantolestidae group, whose appearance and way of life corresponded roughly to today's otters. The Paroxyclaenidae are directly related, but only a 12 cm long skull of Vulpavoides and a 5 cm long lower jaw fragment of Pugiodens are documented. The short-snouted animals were probably arboreal. Their remains were originally classified as "Creodonta", later as "Condylarthra". The insectivore Saturninia from the group Nyctitheriidae is also very rare, but with several, partly completely toothed lower jaws. Rodents are rare and occurred in only a few forms. Ailuravus was very large, around one meter long, and resembled modern squirrels. Few dentition remains come from the again much smaller Masillamys, the Messelmaus named after the Messel Pit with a very long tail and a total length of 40 cm. Also significant are the remains of bats, of which 25 complete skeletons with parts of the wing skin are known. They can largely be assigned to the genera Matthesia and Cecilionycteris. They belong to the Palaeochiropterygidae family, whose representatives already hunted with echolocations of 30 to 70 kHz due to the structure of the ear ossicles.

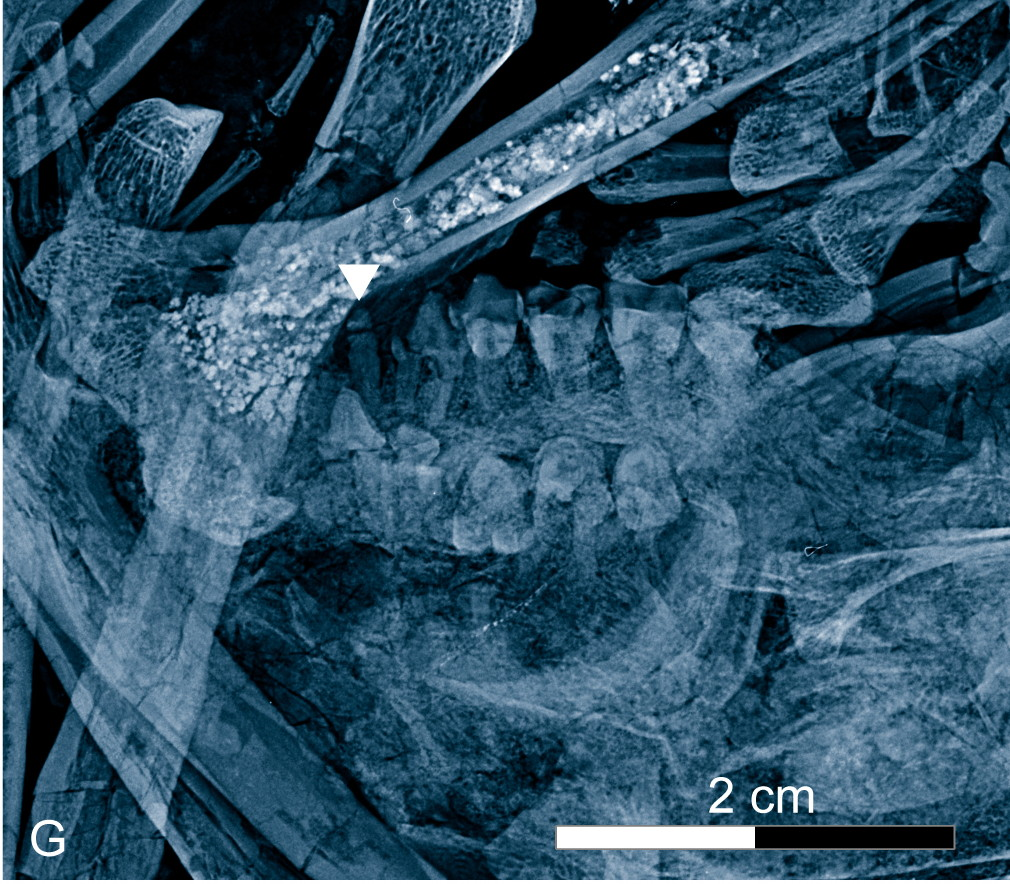
X-ray image of Godinotia from the Geisel Valley

Remarkable remains also come from the primates. Particularly important here are the Adapidae, of which several genera occurred in the Geiseltal and which may have been precursors of today's lemurs. Europolemur has survived with several skulls and mandibles. One of the few almost complete skeletons of an adapid primate in the world is Godinotia. This early primate, which was closely related to the Darwinius known from the Messel Pit, had a distinctly short facial skull and large eye sockets, indicating a nocturnal lifestyle. Nannopithex is very diverse with several species, but belongs to a more modern family of primates.

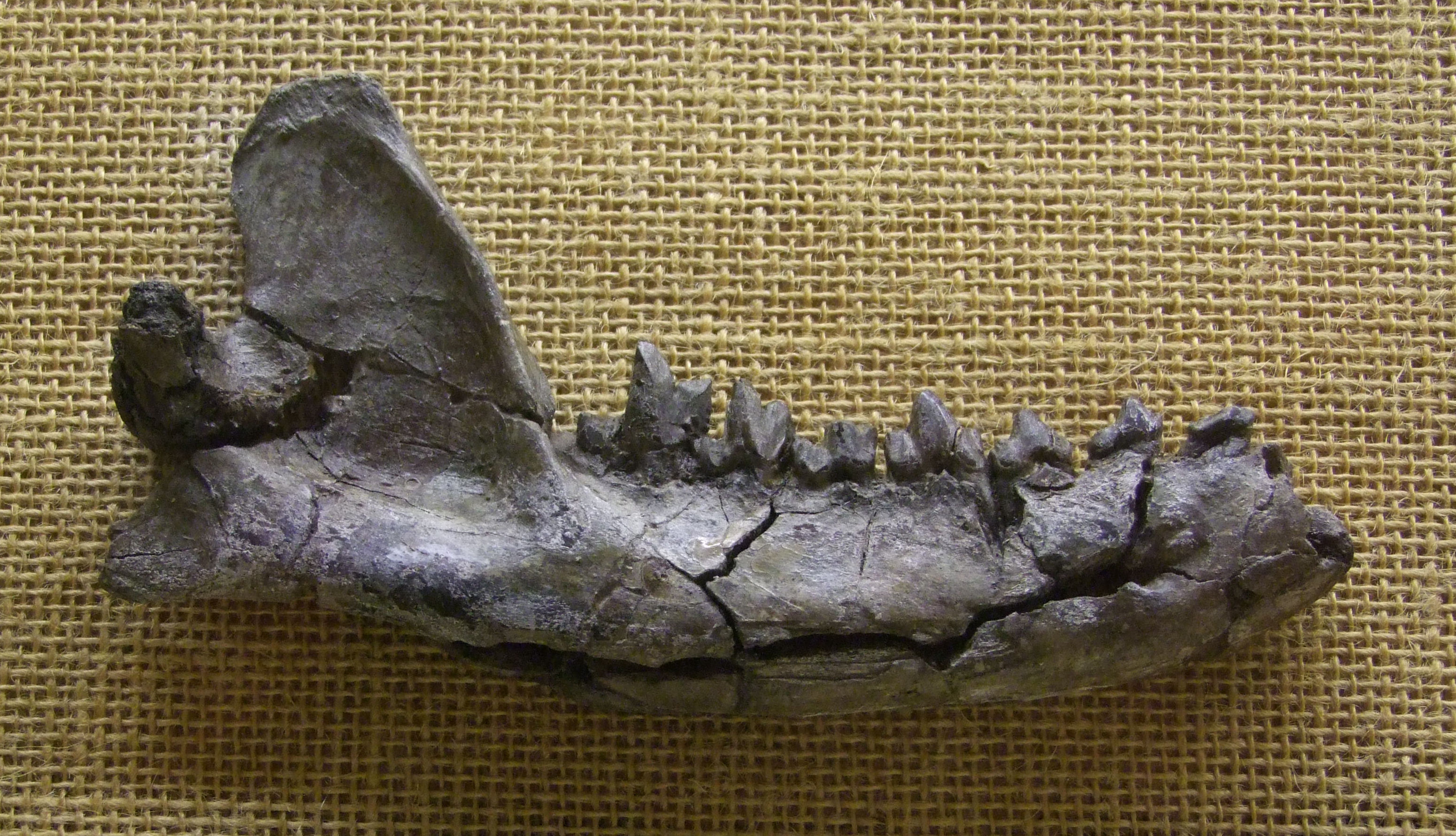
Lower jaw of Prodissopsalis from the Geiseltal

The now extinct "Creodonta" were more predatory animals. These include above all the Hyaenodonta with around 50 finds, including mainly lower jaws, but also some skulls, upper jaw fragments and isolated remains of the locomotor system. These include Eurotherium, Matthodon, Prodissopsalis and Leonhardtina, the latter two being the most common and each comprising around a dozen fossils. Overall, all creodonts found in the Geisel Valley were relatively small, with a complete skull of Eurotherium measuring around 12 cm in length. A crushed skull and a single posterior upper premolar represent the true carnivores and were originally classified as Miacis, but are now classified as Quercygale.

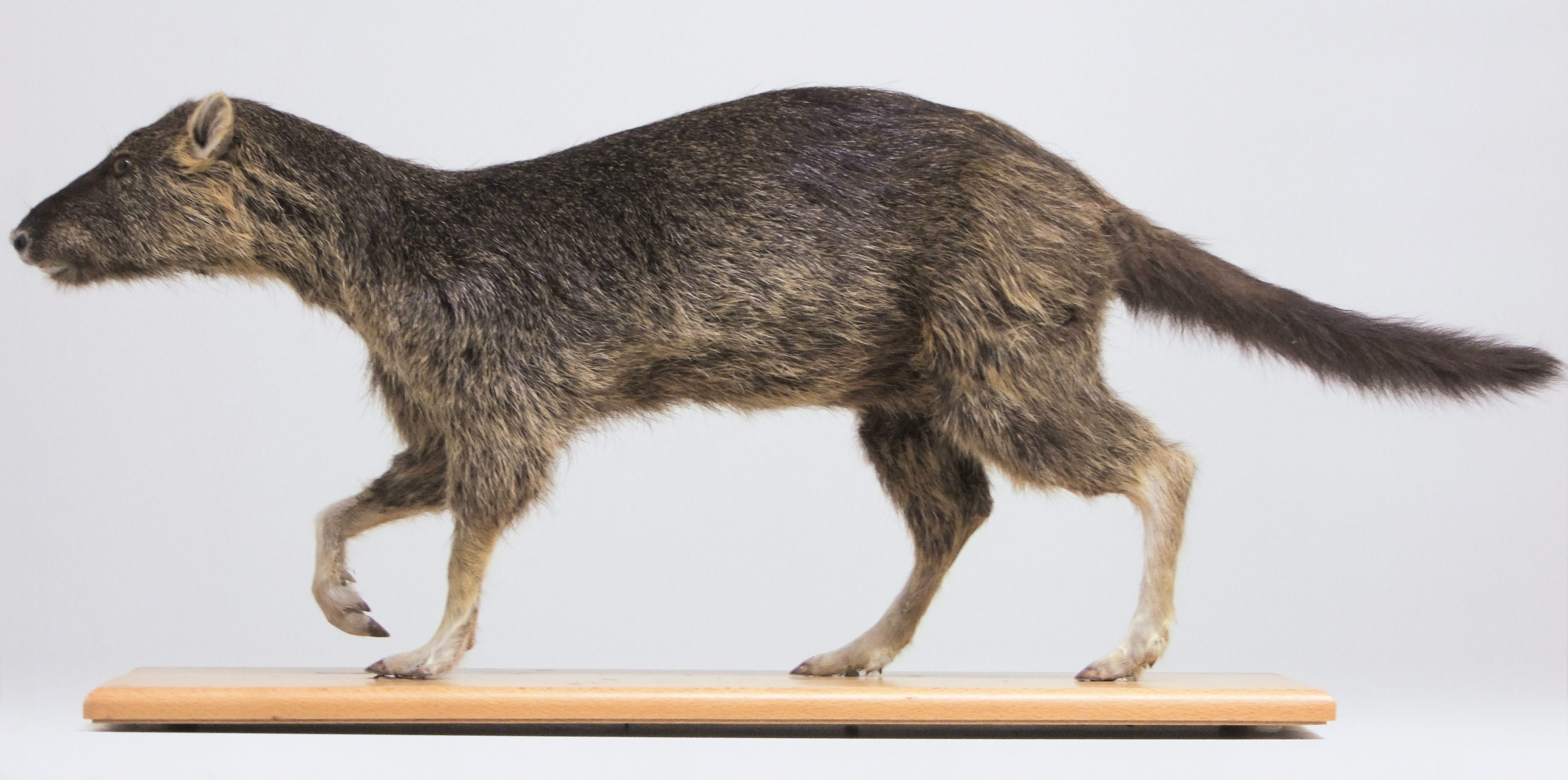
Live reconstruction of Amphirhagatherium from the Geisel Valley

The fossil material of the even-toed ungulates is comparatively extensive, with around 170 finds from around 60 individuals. The artiodactyls of the Geiseltal were all characterized by a very ancient physique with an upwardly arched back, very long tails and short front and long hind legs. They were all smaller than today's relatives and reached a maximum of piglet size. One of the most primitive cloven-hoofed animals was Diacodexis from the Diacodexeidae group, although only a few bone remains have survived. The Eurodexis from the closely related group of the Dichobunidae is somewhat more developed, as evidenced by a crushed skull. Its closer relatives include Messelobunodon and Aumelasia, both of which are also documented with a few finds. The representatives of the somewhat more developed Choeropotamidae, which are more closely related to the hippopotamus and were endemic in today's Europe, have been observed most frequently. An almost complete skeleton is available from Masillabune, while Hallebune is only represented by a few fragments of teeth. Several skeletal remains, including seven almost complete ones, can be attributed to Amphirhagatherium. This approximately 70 cm long and about 4 kg heavy animal was not only the most common, but also the largest cloven-hoofed animal of the Geiseltal and is widely distributed over the Lower and Middle Coal. In addition, a few remains of other even-toed ungulates such as Haplobunodon or Rhagatherium are known.

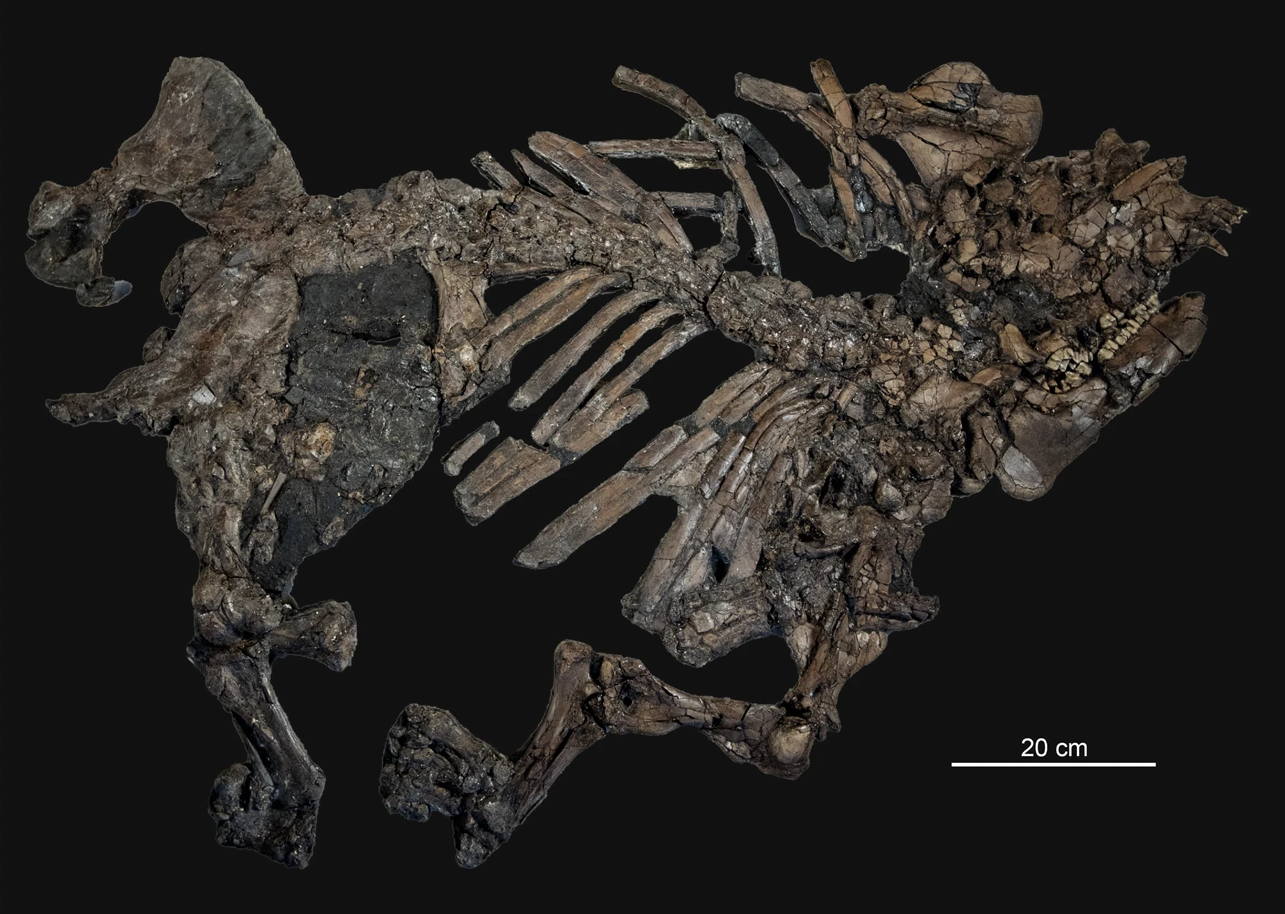
Skeleton of Lophiodon from the Geiseltal

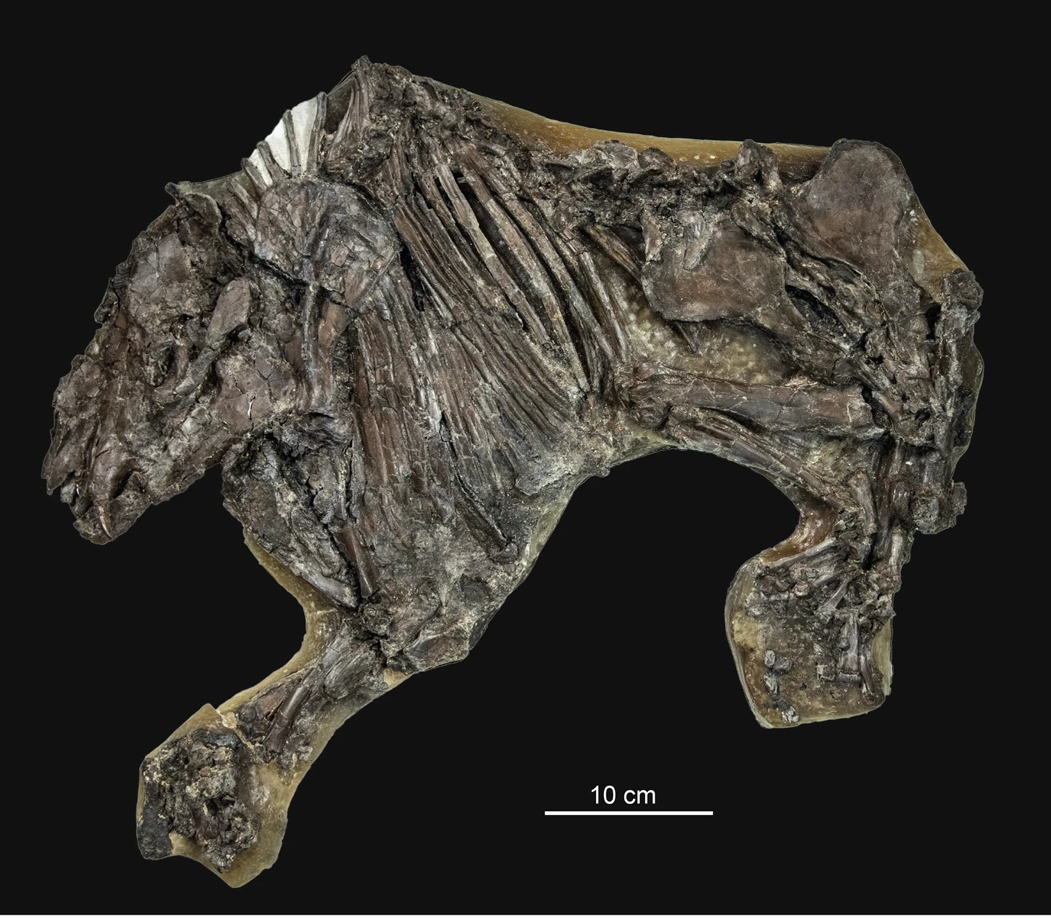
Skeleton of Propalaeotherium from the Geiseltal, discovered in 1933 and one of the best-known finds

The odd-toed ungulates have the most extensive finds. These also had an ancient physique with an arched back and four toes on the front feet and three on the hind feet, which today only occurs in tapirs. Over 310 lower and 120 upper jaw remains, including two complete skeletons, come from the horse relatives from the Palaeotheriidae group. Of particular note is the well-known prehistoric horse Propalaeotherium, which is represented by several species. A complete skeleton with a 56 cm long torso, a 20 cm long skull and a shoulder height of 40 cm was discovered in 1933. Other genera that occur are Lophiotherium, Hallensia and Eurohippus. There are only a few teeth of the very rare Plagiolophus. With almost 180 individuals, Lophiodon, a tapir relative with a body length of 2.5 m and a shoulder height of 1 m, is also very common and represents the largest representative of the mammals from the Geiseltal. On an area of 131 m^{2} alone, 110 individuals were discovered, probably the remains of a crocodile feeding ground. Fossil finds of Lophiodon are known from all fossil-bearing seams, whereby the genus underwent a significant increase in body size from bottom to top. In addition, its relative Hyrachyus appeared rarer and was found with about 75 dentition remains and some parts of the body skeleton. Hyrachyus was more modern in construction than Lophiodon and stands at the base of the evolution of rhinoceroses and tapirs.

=== Soft tissue, chemofossils and food residues ===
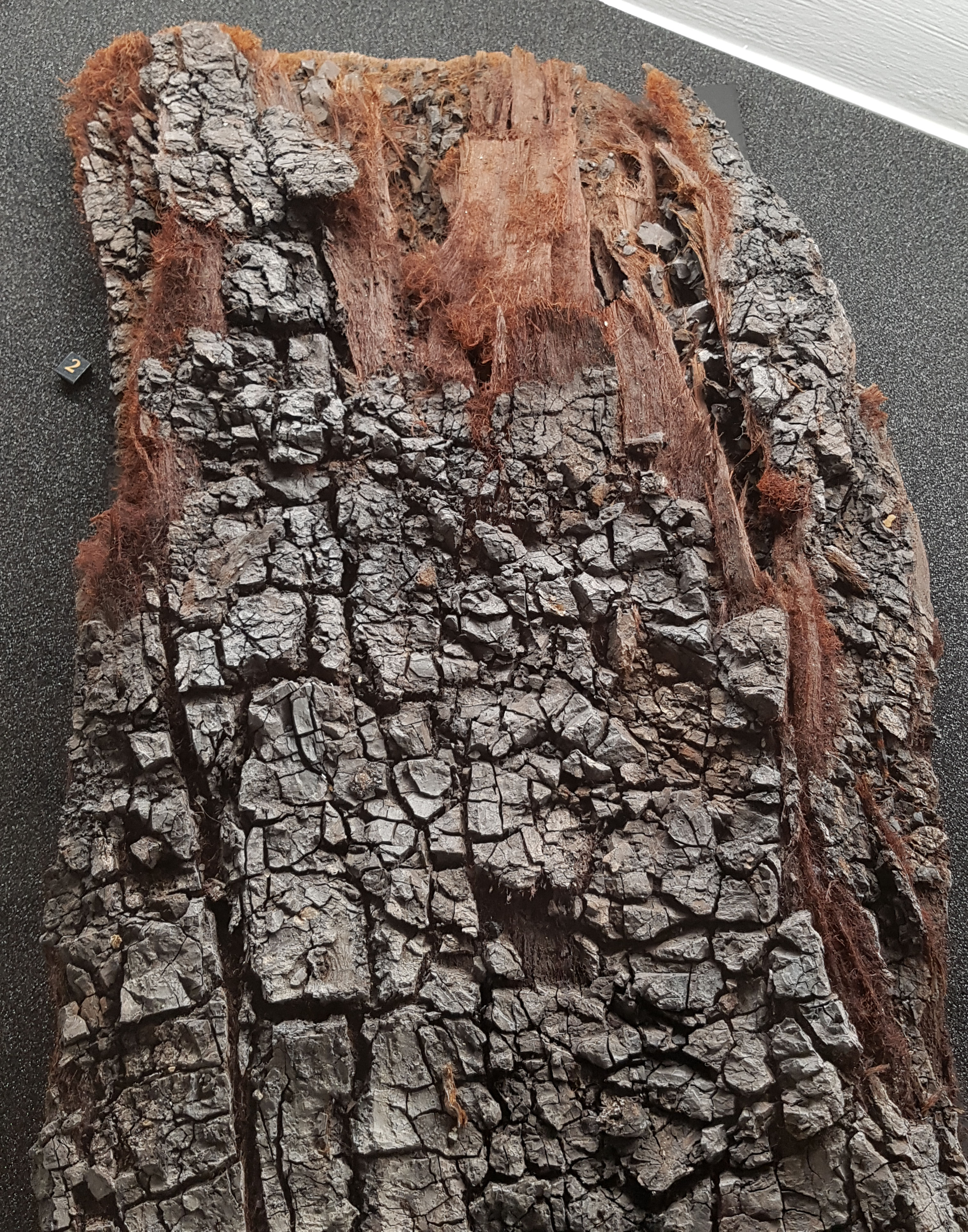
Fossilized milky sap tubes ("monkey hair") from the Geisel Valley

Remains of soft parts have also been preserved in the lignite of the Geiseltal, which is extremely rare. Fossil soft tissues were first discovered in the Geiseltal in 1934, making them one of the very first such finds from the Eocene. The discoveries were only made with the development of the lacquer film method. This made it possible to recognize the fine scale relief in individual fishes, for example in Thaumaturus, as well as in pangolins and more rarely in crocodiles. The skin of numerous frogs could be examined, the individual layers of which, the epidermis and dermis, can be recognized down to the individual cells. Feathers have been found on some remains of birds, some of which were colored; the flight skin of bats has survived. In mammals, such as Amphirhagatherium and more rarely Propalaeotherium, parts of the hair coat have been found. It was also possible to document muscles, cartilage and the like, right down to blood cells.

In addition, the original coloration of certain soft parts, especially the skin, could be identified. For example, the fish palaeoesox had a zebra pattern on its body and a dark-colored back, while a greenish skin tone could be observed in frogs. In insects, the color shades of the animals are preserved, in plants the chlorophyll has survived. Such chemofossils also include "monkey hair", which is often found in large quantities. These are fibrous, light-brown structures flattened by storage in the lignite, which have been preserved through natural sulphur volcanization. They represent fossilized milky sap tubes of rubber-producing woody plants from the dog poison family, of which leaves of the genus Apocynophyllum are present from the Geiseltal. According to the recent genus Couma, however, the "monkey hair" is referred to Coumoxylon as a form taxon.

Other finds are mainly the food remains of numerous animals, which were also discovered early on, for example in 1935 in the tapir relative Lophiodon as a greenish plant mass. They have also been found in other mammals such as the prehistoric horse Propalaeotherium and the even-toed ungulate Amphirhagatherium, also of the ostrich-like bird Palaeotis. At least 100 specimens of coprolites and additional fragments have also been documented. They are mostly in ovoid or sausage-like form with lengths ranging from a few millimetres to a decimetre and sometimes contain remains of bones, claws or plants. Various reptiles and mammals can be assumed to have caused them. Some of the fossilized faecal remains also contain gastroliths, possibly from crocodiles. Crocodiles have occasionally left bite marks on mammal bones and turtle shells.

=== Dating ===
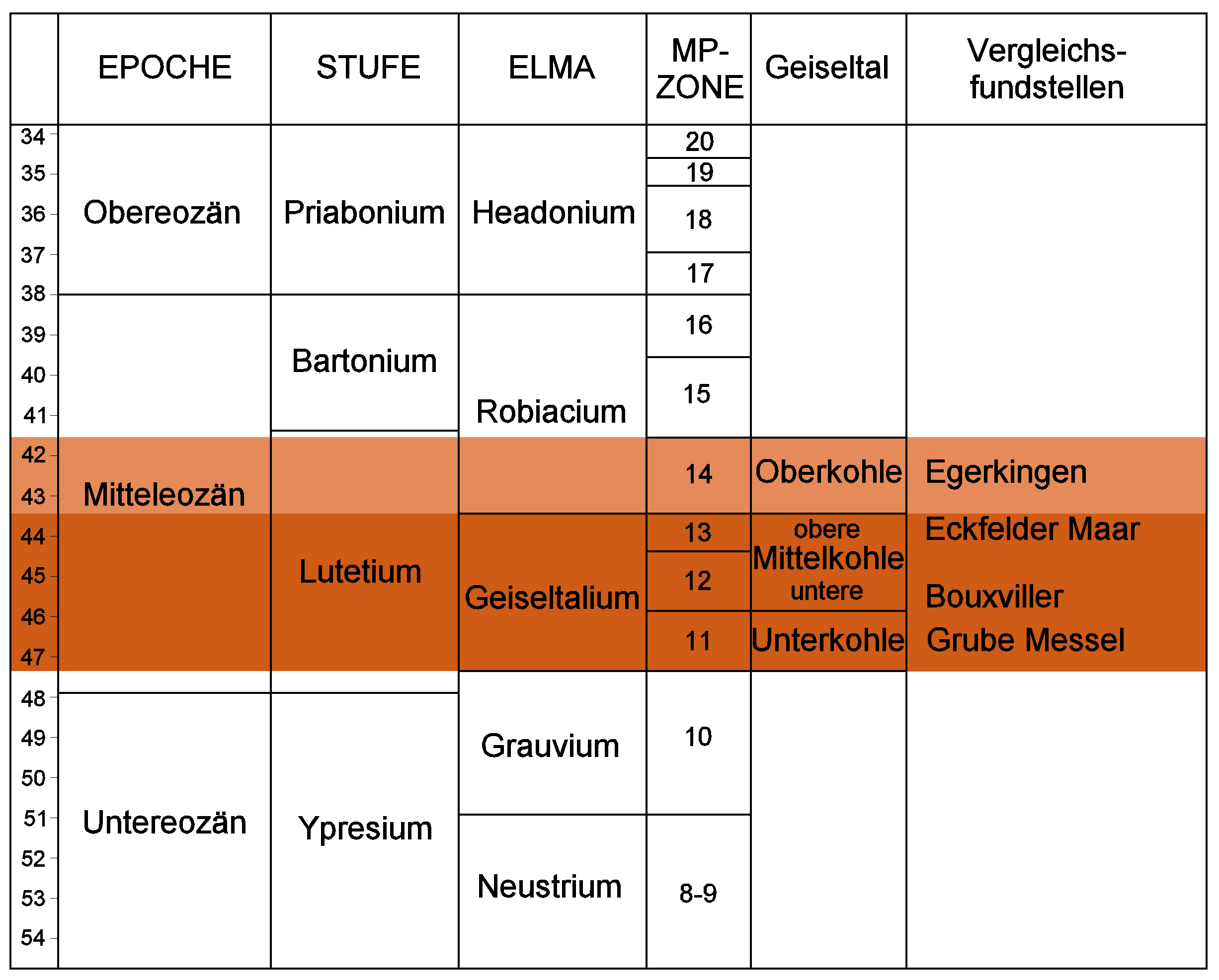
Stratigraphic position of the Geiseltal within the Eocene

The faunistic remains, especially of mammals, are important for the exact age classification of the lignite of the Geiseltal, which also allows a comparison with other sites and outcrops. This biostratigraphic This biostratigraphic age determination is largely based on the changes in the dental morphology of certain mammal groups, which allows the chronological occurrence of extinct species and genera to be determined. The first vertebrate finds discovered at the beginning of the 20th century, tooth remains of the tapir relative Lophiodon, led to the classification of the lignite in the geological epoch of the Middle Eocene. This also determined the more precise relative age of the lignites, which had previously only been suspected. The Middle Eocene is dated to an age of 47.8 to 41.3 million years and consists of the lower stage Lutetian and the upper stage Bartonian. The exact age of the Geiseltal lignites can be determined relatively precisely by the occurrence of certain mammal forms. This places the rich finds of the Lower Coal up to the Upper Middle Coal in the Geiseltalian zone, a stage within the stratigraphy of European land mammals (European Land Mammal Ages, ELMA). The Geiseltalian serves as a reference for the Geiseltal fauna and also forms a middle section of the Lutetian. The few finds of the Upper Coal are referred to a younger zone, the Robiacium. The beginning of the Geiseltalian is accompanied by the appearance of early forms of the prehistoric horse Propalaeotherium, but also its relative Lophiotherium or the primate Europolemur, while the end is indicated by the first appearance of primates such as Adapis.

Absolute dating using radiometric measurement methods are not available from the Geiseltal. However, they have been carried out at sites of approximately the same age. For example, data determined using potassium-argon dating originate from the important Messel Pit in Hesse, which from a biostratigraphic point of view corresponds to the lower coal section of the Geiseltal, and yielded an age of 47.8 million years. As the basalt examined originates from an area beneath the fossil-bearing lake sediments of the Messel Pit, the age value is to be regarded as the maximum age, meaning that the finds there are somewhat younger (terminus post quem). The Eckfelder Maar in Rhineland-Palatinate represents a biostratigraphic equivalent to the upper Middle Coal. Data from pyroclasts obtained there using the same measurement method, also below the find layer, yielded a value of 44.3 million years. This is also to be regarded as the lowest age. This means that the age classification of the Geiseltalium, to which an age of 47.4 to 43.4 million years is attributed today, and thus of the finds from the Geiseltal, can be regarded as quite reliable.

=== Landscape reconstruction ===
The numerous plant and animal remains, as well as the large amount of geological data, allow a fairly accurate reconstruction of the former landscape conditions. According to this, the Geiseltal in the Middle Eocene was a water-rich moorland landscape that extended in a north–south direction over a length of four to five kilometers and was located near the coast at a bay that penetrated far inland. This land incision, known as the Central German Estuary, was at least temporarily exposed to the tides based on pollen finds of the palm genus Nypa from the Middle Coal, formed numerous bays and local depressions and basins, especially in the middle section of the Eocene (more precisely in the Lutetian), which promoted the formation of lignite, such as the Helmstedt lignite field in the northwest or the lignite deposits of Egeln and Edderitz further south. This branched system also led to the formation of marine, brackish and fluviatile and limnic deposits in the Geiseltal deposits (the main agents) as legacies of the estuary. The subtropical climate at that time contributed to the formation of numerous bogs, ponds and pools with a rich vegetation on the edge of the estuary. The onset of coalification of the dead plant material led to the formation of thick lignite seams over a period of six to possibly eight million years. The area was bordered to the south by a shell limestone plateau with steep slopes sloping down to the north. The plateau itself was partly karstified. The chemical weathering created limestone water which penetrated the moorland and ensured the excellent preservation of the fossils.

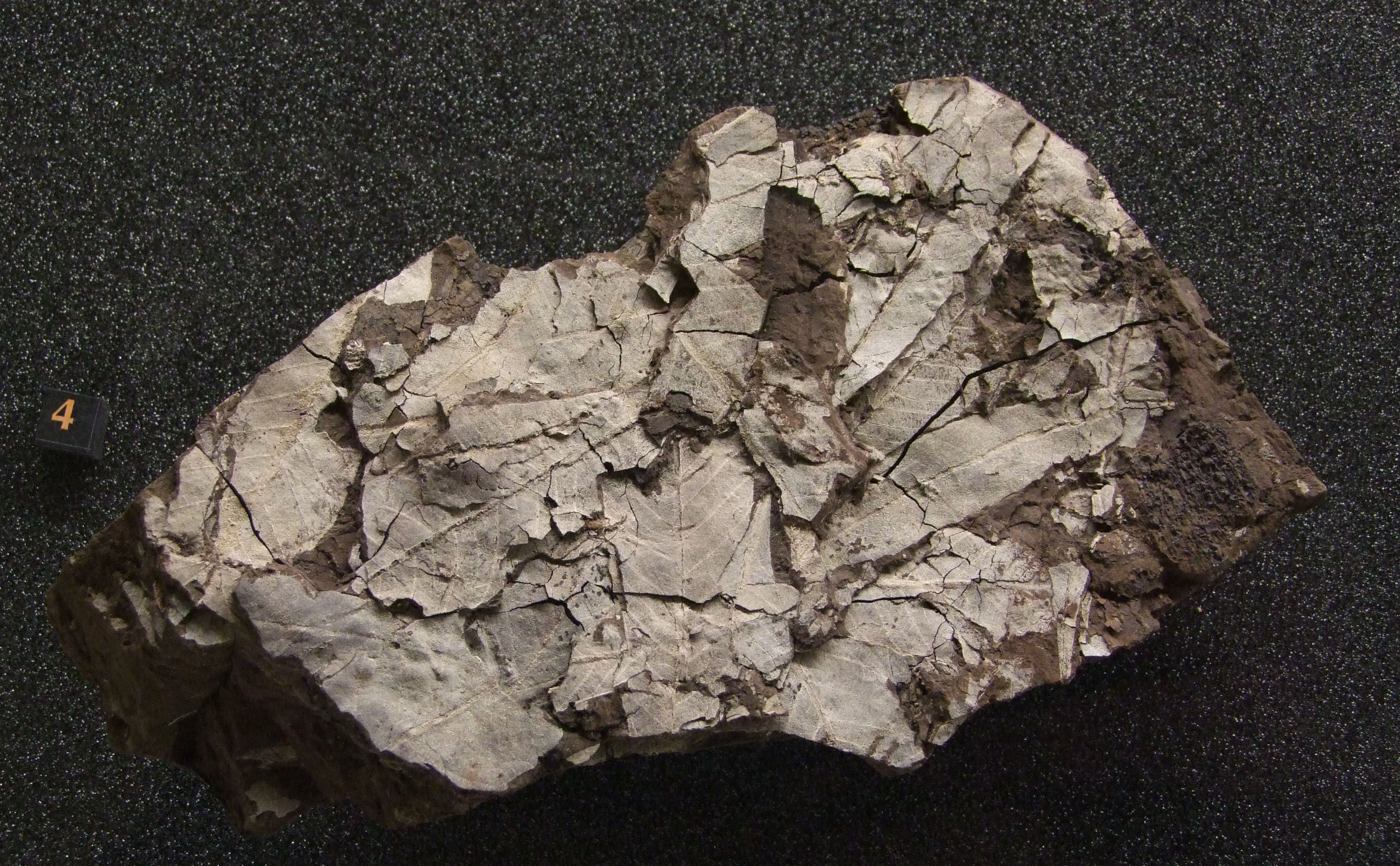
Thick layer of leaves of Dryophyllum from the Geiseltal

The bog area was interspersed with numerous small pools and ponds, around eight to ten meters in diameter, which are indicated by collapse funnels and served as drinking places for the fossil fauna. Acrostichum, Myricaceae and Restionaceae plant communities grew in the adjacent bank area. In the wider area there were shrub and forest landscapes of palm-pine forests, interspersed with sequoias and other conifers and deciduous trees, which were rich in herbs and light and had several growth levels. These forests were crisscrossed by a network of meandering watercourses that periodically overflowed their banks. Towards the south in the direction of the Muschelkalk range, these forests merged into a dense primeval forest of laurel plants. Due to the relative proximity to the coast, the altitude at that time probably did not exceed 50 m above sea level. The climate was generally subtropical with frost-free and dry winters with an average temperature of at least 5 °C and humid summers with a growing season of up to nine months and an average of 25 °C in the warmest month, as determined by the numerous fruits and seeds. The annual precipitation was probably around 2070 mm. Due to the significant differences in temperature during the summer and winter months, the landscape was subject to an annual periodicity of rainy and dry seasons, which can also be demonstrated by tree rings and a fine warve of the lignite. As a result, leaf fall can be regarded as probable, so that the leaves formed a loose litter layer on the ground. From the lower to the middle coal, however, an increasing dryness of the climate could be determined.

This diverse landscape was inhabited by numerous animals. Leaf- and fruit-eating mammals such as Lophiodon, Propalaeotherium and Amphirhagatherium lived mainly in the forests. The rich insect fauna in turn provided food for numerous other animals, such as frogs, frogs and pangolins, but also leptictids, bats and some primates. The ponds and pools were home to aquatic or amphibious animals. Of particular note are the numerous crocodile forms, which, like today, preferred a much warmer climate and thus also represent an important climate indicator. The richness of the ecosystems and the long depositional period of around 3 million years also reveals certain networks of relationships that go beyond pure food chains. This can be seen, for example, in Lophiodon and Propalaeotherium, which represent the two most common mammal forms and probably had a special ecological relationship due to the use of the same food resources. However, while Lophiodon increased in body size over time (averaging 124 kg in the Lower Coal and 223 kg in the Upper Coal), Propalaeotherium decreased in weight (averaging 39 kg in the Lower Coal and 26 kg in the Upper Middle Coal). This is possibly an example of the gradual adaptation to different ecological niches to avoid too strong competition with each other.

=== Comparison with regionally and nationally significant sites ===
From the regional neighborhood of the Geiseltal, the equally old lignite outcrops from the Leipzig area (the Weißelster basin) or the Helmstedt area are of particular importance. Although there are no vertebrate remains here, countless floristic finds are known. For example, macro-remains in the form of conifer cones and palm leaves are found in the open-cast mines near Helmstedt, while numerous leaf finds of dicotyledonouss come from the Profen open-cast mine. The general vegetation history determined on the basis of the microflora largely corresponds to that of the Geiseltal. Vertebrate sites of the same age are not known from the immediate region. However, the Walbeck Fossil Deposit in the northwest of Saxony-Anhalt is one of the most extensive mammal communities in the world from the Middle Palaeocene period almost 60 million years ago. The fauna, comprising several thousand bone and tooth remains, differs from that of the Geiseltal in the dominance of prehistoric mammals from the groups of Procreodi, "Condylarthra" or Leptictida, while representatives of more modern, still existing lineages such as the primates occur rather rarely or are completely absent, as in the even-toed ungulates and odd-toed ungulates. Walbeck thus represents an important testimony from the early phase of radiation of mammals shortly after the extinction of the dinosaurs.

The Messel Pit in Hesse and the Eckfelder Maar in Rhineland-Palatinate are of outstanding importance in a supra-regional comparison. Both represent sites in former maars, whereby Messel is roughly contemporaneous with the Lower Coal of the Geiseltal, Eckfeld with the Upper Middle Coal. In addition to plant and invertebrate finds, a large number of vertebrate remains are known from both sites, currently comprising around 130 taxa in Messel, whereas the number of finds from Eckefeld is comparatively smaller. While the composition of the mammal fauna generally shows similarities, there are clear differences in the details. For example, rodents and bats are underrepresented in the Geiseltal and in Eckfeld, but are more common and more diverse in Messel. In contrast, Messel is characterized by a smaller number of primate and even-toed ungulate forms, which in turn are well and diversely documented in the Geiseltal and Eckfeld, with striking differences reflected in the occurrence of different genera. Similar differences can also be identified for individual mammal genera, such as Lophiodon from the odd-toed ungulate group, which is one of the dominant forms in the Geiseltal, but in Messel was only found with a young animal and individual tooth finds, in Eckfeld with a lower jaw and also a few tooth remains. Remarkable in Eckfeld is the previous absence of ancient mammal groups such as the "Creodonta" and "Condylarthra", which occur to a small extent at least in Messel and in the Geiseltal. Differences can also be seen in other groups of finds. For example, the jewel beetles are relatively common in the Geiseltal with more than a quarter of all beetle finds, whereas in Messel they are rather rare with less than a tenth, although there is a generally higher diversity of forms of beetles overall. The fact that only a few forms of jewel beetles occur simultaneously at both sites indicates significant ecological differences, which are also reflected in the sometimes differing diversity of the various plant and animal groups and shows that the individual fossil deposits each represent only a section of the rich landscape at that time.

== Research history ==
=== Scientific excavations ===
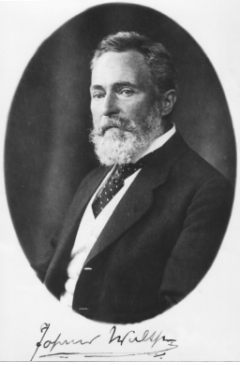
Johannes Walther, initiator of the scientific excavations in the Geisel Valley

Although the mining of brown coal in the Geiseltal can be traced back to the year 1698, the first fossils were discovered relatively late. The earliest fossil find dates back to 1908 and includes remains of the tapir relative Lophiodon, which were picked up rather by chance by a miner in the open-cast mine Cecilie. Further finds were recovered in 1912, including several dentition remains of three individuals and belonging to the same genus. The following year, remains of turtles were observed for the first time in a plant-bearing charcoal layer, although some of the finds disintegrated after being uncovered. Some of the remaining fossils were handed over to the Geologische Landesanstalt in Berlin.

Further turtle discoveries in 1925 then led to systematic scientific excavations, which were initiated by the geologist Johannes Walther (1860–1937) initiated and which the University of Halle coordinated. English-born Ben Barnes took over the local management. He mainly investigated various areas in the Cecilie open-cast mine. The aim was not only to record qualitatively complete specimens, but also to gain a quantitative overview of the fossil content of the lignite, so that even smaller or poorly preserved finds could be documented. Barnes' excavations uncovered the remains of snakes and turtles as well as teeth and bones of various ungulates. The work resulted in the first comprehensive scientific publication in 1927. After Walther retired from teaching, Johannes Weigelt (1890–1948) continued to teach. Weigelt's research focused on fossilization processes, for a better understanding of which he examined numerous recent decaying animal cadavers. He called this "biostratinomy", thus anticipating taphonomy as a field of research. For the purpose of better preservation of fossils, Ehrhard Voigt (1905–2004) developed the lacquer film method at the beginning of the 1930s. Only one year later, the only significant upper coal site with over 20 individuals of Lophiodon, including an almost complete skeleton, was examined in the same open-cast mine. Scientific research in the Cecilie open-cast mine came to a standstill in 1935 due to the depletion of coal reserves. Further excavations were then carried out in the Leonhardt open-cast mine, among others, but came to a standstill in 1938. The outbreak of World War II in 1939 put a definitive end to this first important period of research.

Excavation work was resumed in 1949 and was subsequently funded on a larger scale by the GDR government. In addition, numerous scientists from other nations were involved in the analysis of the finds. The expansion of open-cast mining operations, which reached its peak in the middle of the 20th century, led to the discovery of numerous other sites, including in the Pfännerhall and Mücheln mining fields (which comprised the former Pauline, Elisabeth, Emma and Elise II areas of the western Geiseltal). In the process, the scientists discovered one of the richest fossil sites, XIV, where they were able to prove a new type of site in addition to those already defined by Weigelt. The increase in coal extraction led to more excavation work being carried out to accompany mining, so that the 1960s and 1970s in particular represented a high point in the exploration of the Geiseltal. It was only when the coal reserves began to dwindle (the eastern and south-eastern Geiseltal had already been exhausted by the early 1970s and the abandoned open-cast mines had been partially flooded) and mining moved to the more northern and western parts of the Geiseltal, where fossil preservation was less good, that the scientific on-site investigations also declined and came to a temporary end in 1985. During this research phase, more than 55 new sites were discovered, including 23 with vertebrate remains.

After the political change in the GDR in 1989, the situation changed fundamentally. The original plan was to continue mining lignite in the western Geiseltal until 1998, but this was discontinued in mid-1993 due to changed market conditions and the renaturation of the entire open-cast mining area began. This led to the last investigations of a site in the southern Geiseltal from spring to fall 1992, with employees of the Forschungsinstitut Senckenberg also being involved. The following year, this last vertebrate site was flooded by rising groundwater. Between the years 2000 and 2003, the last field activities were again carried out together with the Senckenberg Research Institute in the western Geiseltal, which mainly concerned a coal seam over 20 m thick, which contained countless plant material up to 25 m long tree trunks. Due to the chemical properties of the lignite in this area of the Geiseltal, however, no vertebrate remains could be observed. In June 2003, the planned flooding of the western Geiseltal to form the Geiseltalsee began, which reached its final water level in spring 2011, creating one of the largest artificial lakes in Central Europe. This marked the final end of scientific activities at the site.

=== Presentation of findings ===
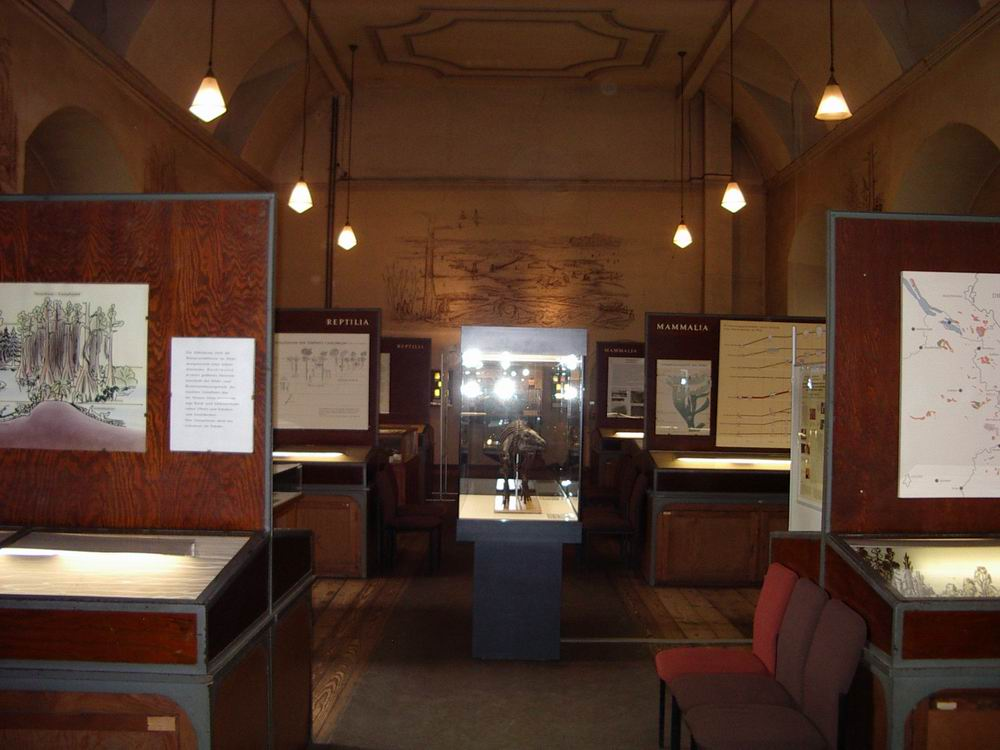
Geiseltal Museum, exhibition room

The Geiseltal Museum was opened in 1934, just nine years after the start of the excavations, due to the immense amount of finds in the Neue Residenz, which was commissioned by Cardinal Albrecht II and built between 1531 and 1537 near the Halle Cathedral in the city of Halle. The museum simultaneously served as a collection depot and exhibition, with the latter being set up in the All Saints' Chapel on an area of 267 m^{2}. The other rooms of the New Residence were used by the Geological-Palaeontological Institute of the Martin Luther University Halle-Wittenberg. The museum's heraldic animal was the Propalaeotherium prehistoric horse skeleton from 1933. The exhibition was interrupted shortly before the end of World War II in 1945, when the finds had to be removed for security reasons.

In 1950, the exhibition reopened under the motto "A journey through Central Germany's geological history" - extended by eight rooms and technically revised in 1954. As a result of a university reform at the end of the 1960s, the museum and collection were to be relocated, which was averted by the then director Horst Werner Matthes. However, the new exhibition opened in 1950 had to be closed and reduced in size. In the following years, technical and financial bottlenecks meant that it was not possible to invest in a more modern exhibition or in repairing the buildings of the Neue Residenz, which made it necessary to protect individual objects from damage due to rain or thaw. This only changed for the better after 1989 with the political change in the GDR. However, the building fabric of the Neue Residenz remained in poor condition. When the current Institute of Geosciences moved to new and more modern premises on the new campus at Von-Seckendorf-Platz in 2004, only the Geiseltal Museum and its collection remained and celebrated its 70th anniversary there.

The museum was closed from the end of 2011 until May 2018 and the collection was not open to the public. It was reopened as part of the Long Night of Museums on May 5, 2018. In spring 2015, a special exhibition entitled "From the dawn: horse-hunting crocodiles and giant birds" at the Tschernyschewski-Haus of the Leopoldina in Halle provided information on the latest findings from research into the Geiseltal fossil deposit. Between November 2017 and May 2018, some important fossils from the Geiseltal were part of the special exhibition "Climate Forces - Driving Force of Evolution" at the State Museum of Prehistory in Halle. In 2012, the entire collection was awarded the status of "nationally valuable cultural asset" and is therefore protected by the government.

== Literature ==
- Alexander K. Hastings, Meinolf Hellmund: Aus der Morgendämmerung: Pferdejagende Krokodile und Riesenvögel. Neueste Forschungsergebnisse zur eozänen Welt Deutschlands vor ca. 45 Millionen Jahren. Halle (Saale), 2015, p. 1–120.
- Meinolf Hellmund: Exkursion: Ehemaliges Geiseltalrevier, südwestlich von Halle (Saale). Aus der Vita des eozänen Geiseltales. In: Jörg Erfurt, Lutz Christian Maul (ed.): 34. Tagung des Arbeitskreises für Wirbeltierpaläontologie der Paläontologischen Gesellschaft 16. bis 18. März 2007 in Freyburg/Unstrut. In: Hallesches Jahrbuch für Geowissenschaften. Beiheft 23, 2007, p. 1–16.
- Günter Krumbiegel, Ludwig Rüffle, Hartmut Haubold: Das eozäne Geiseltal: ein mitteleuropäisches Braunkohlenvorkommen und seine Pflanzen- und Tierwelt. Ziemsen, Wittenberg 1983, p. 1–227, OCLC 9998655.
