= Calcar =

Spur of cartilage in bats

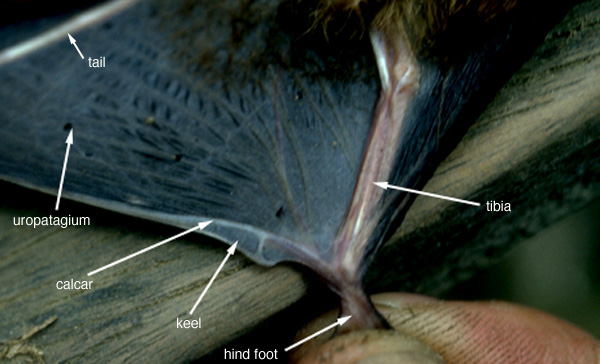
A picture illustrating the location of the calcar on a bat.

The calcar, also known as the calcaneum, is the name given to a spur of cartilage arising from inner side of ankle and running along part of outer interfemoral membrane in bats, as well as to a similar spur on the legs of some arthropods.

The calcar serves to help spread the interfemoral membrane, which is part of the wing membrane between the tail and the hind legs.

Calcar (femorale) also refers to the dense, vertically oriented bone present in the posteromedial region of the femoral shaft inferior to the lesser trochanter.

== Usage history ==
It is unclear who first coined the word "calcar" to apply to bat anatomy; records of its usage date to Joel Asaph Allen in 1893. The word calcar is derived from Latin "calx," meaning "heel". Other terms or phrases that refer to the same feature include "supplementary calcaneal bones", "styliform bones", "les éperons" (French), "Fußwurzelstachels" (German), "spurs", and "stylets".

== Prevalence ==
Not all bats have a calcar, as not all bats have a well-developed uropatagium. Of the bats that have a developed uropatagium, most, but not all, have a calcar.

The Kitti's hog-nosed bat is the only species of bat that has an extensive uropatagium while lacking a calcar.

== Structure ==
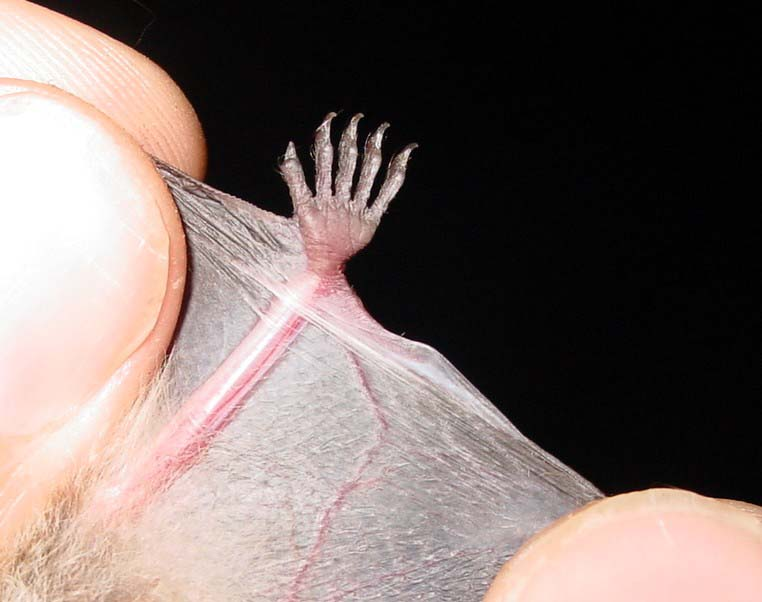
Keeled calcar of the Indiana bat

The calcar varies widely among bats. It can be as small as 1 mm (0.039 in), or longer than 30 mm (1.2 in). In some species of bat, the calcar is very long and bladelike. Examples of this include species in the genera Noctilio and Diclidurus.

In other species, the calcar is very small or absent, such as the Kitti's hog-nosed bat or species in the genera Rhinopoma, Diaemus, Mystacina, Syconycteris, Harpyionycteris, and Notopterus.

In the hairy-legged vampire bat, the calcar has a unique, finger-like form that extends approximately 3 mm (0.12 in) beyond the edge of the uropatagium. Some insectivorous species of bats have an elaborate, pronounced calcar. This form of calcar is referred to as a "keeled calcar", and it is hypothesized that it may be useful in converting the uropatagium into a basket for catching insects.

For species in some genera (for example, Vampyrum and Phyllostomus), the calcar is entirely made of cartilage. In other genera (e.g. Saccopteryx, Pteronotus, Molossus), the calcar is calcified. Intermediate between these two forms is when one end of the calcar is calcified, while the other is cartilaginous (e.g. Noctilio and Trachops). All megabats, however, lack any calcification in their calcar.

In microbats, movement of the calcar is controlled by several muscles, including the gastrocnemius muscle, m. calcaneocutaneous, and m. depressor ossis styliformis. M. depressor ossis styliformis abducts the calcar towards the foot, which spreads the uropatagium. M. calcaneocutaneous works in opposition to m. depressor ossis styliformis, helping to stabilize the calcar. The gastrocnemius muscle aids in flexion of the foot, working in conjunction with m. depressor ossis styliformis to spread the uropatagium.

Unlike microbats, megabats lack the m. calcaneocutaneous muscle for calcar control; megabats do share the other two muscles for calcar control, however.

== Function ==
The calcar can assist the uropatagium in forming a basket or pouch to help catch and hold insects captured in flight. The calcar helps spread the uropatagium during flight, managing its camber. For species of bats that forage via trawling, such as the greater bulldog bat and the fish-eating myotis, the calcar is used to prevent the uropatagium from dragging along the surface of the water. In the hairy-legged vampire bat, the calcar is not used for flight, but rather as a sixth digit to aid in tree-climbing.

== Evolutionary history ==
The oldest known ancestor to present day bats, Icaronycteris index, apparently did not have a calcar or spur as evidenced by fossil remains. The oldest known bat with a calcar is Onychonycteris, which lived in the early Eocene. Onychonycteris had a long calcar, indicative of a broad tail membrane. In describing Onychonycteris in 2008, Simmons hypothesized that its calcar was more relevant to the mechanism of flight than capturing prey.

Some authors have treated the calcar as a synapomorphy, or a unique trait shared by all bats, derived from a common ancestor. However, major differences in calcar structure between the two major clades of bat (formerly Megachiroptera and Microchiroptera, now Yinpterochiroptera and Yangochiroptera) have led other authors to challenge this designation. In a paper published in 1998, Schutt and Simmons advocated for different names for this structure for the two suborders, with the Yangochiroptera (microbats) retaining "calcar" and the Yinpterochiroptera (megabats) using "uropatagial spur." The calcar-like structure is not a synapomorphy, they argued, but rather a similar structure that evolved independently in each suborder. In 2000, Adams and Thibault published a book on bat ontogeny that supported this assertion, stating that various evidence "[supports] the hypothesis of independent origins for the microchiropteran calcar and the megachiropteran ‘uropatagial spur.’ Hence, the calcar, as currently understood, does not meet the assumptions of biological homology." Instead, the calcar of the microbats and the uropatagial spur of the megabats are an example of convergent evolution.
