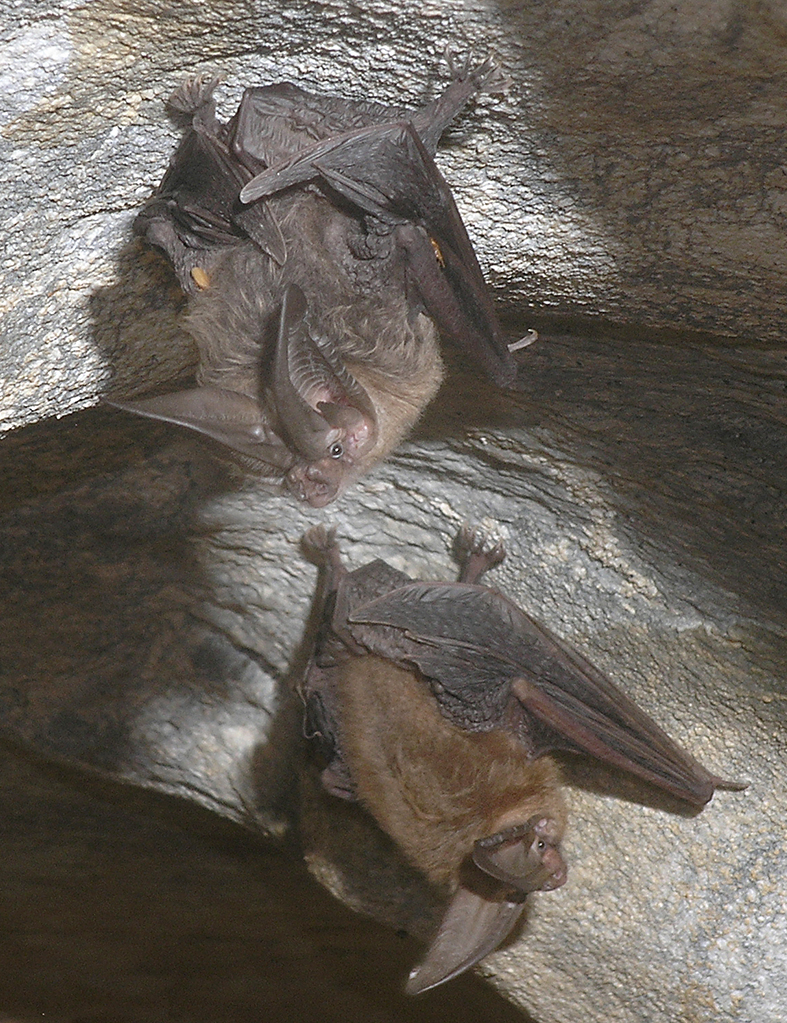
- Townsend's big-eared bats in a cave.

Scientific classification
- Kingdom: Animalia
- Phylum: Chordata
- Class: Mammalia
- Infraclass: Placentalia
- Order: Chiroptera
- Suborder: Microchiroptera; Dobson, 1875

Superfamilies
- Emballonuroidea; Rhinopomatoidea; Rhinolophoidea; Vespertilionoidea; Molossoidea; Nataloidea; Noctilionoidea

= Microbat =

Microbats

Suborder of bats

Microbats constitute the suborder Microchiroptera within the order Chiroptera (bats). Bats have long been differentiated into Megachiroptera (megabats) and Microchiroptera, based on their size, the use of echolocation by the Microchiroptera and other features; molecular evidence suggests a somewhat different subdivision, as the microbats have been shown to be a paraphyletic group.

== Characteristics ==
Microbats are 4 to 16 cm (1.6–6.3 in) long. Most microbats feed on insects, but some of the larger species hunt birds, lizards, frogs, smaller bats or even fish. Only three species of microbat feed on the blood of large mammals or birds ("vampire bats"); these bats live in South and Central America.

Although most "Leaf-nose" microbats are fruit and nectar-eating, the name “leaf-nosed” isn't a designation meant to indicate the preferred diet among said variety. Three species follow the bloom of columnar cacti in northwest Mexico and the Southwest United States northward in the northern spring and then the blooming agaves southward in the northern fall (autumn). Other leaf-nosed bats, such as Vampyrum spectrum of South America, hunt a variety of prey such as lizards and birds. The horseshoe bats of Europe, as well as California leaf-nosed bats, have a very intricate leaf-nose for echolocation, and feed primarily on insects.

=== Differences from megabats ===
- Microbats use echolocation, whereas megabats do not typically. (The Egyptian fruit bat Rousettus egyptiacus is an exception, but does not use the larynx echolocation method of microbats, instead giving scientists the theory that it clicks using its nasal passages and back of its tongue.)
- Microbats lack the claw at the second finger of the forelimb. This finger appears thinner and almost bonded by tissue with the third finger for extra support during flight.
- Megabats lack tails, with the exception of a few genera such as Nyctimene, whereas this trait only occurs in certain species of microbats.
- The ears of microbats possess a tragus (thought to be crucial in echolocation) and are relatively larger than megabat ears, whereas megabat ears are comparatively small and lack a tragus.
- Megabat eyes are quite large, whereas microbat eyes are comparatively smaller.

=== Dentition ===
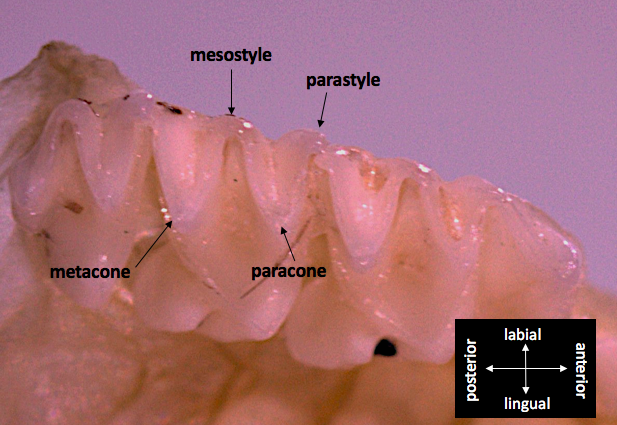
Ventral view of a free-tailed microbat (genus Tadarida) skull displaying a dilambdodont teeth pattern. Specimen from the Pacific Lutheran University Natural History collection.

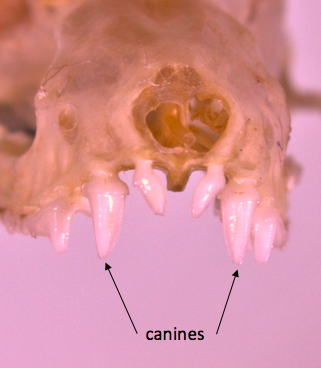
Frontal view of a free-tailed microbat (genus Tadarida) skull displaying the canine teeth. Specimen from the Pacific Lutheran University Natural History collection.

The form and function of microbat teeth differ as a result of the various diets these bats can have. Teeth are primarily designed to break down food; therefore, the shape of the teeth correlate to specific feeding behaviors. In comparison to megabats which feed only on fruit and nectar, microbats illustrate a range of diets and have been classified as insectivores, carnivores, sanguinivores, frugivores, and nectarivores. Differences seen between the size and function of the canines and molars among microbats in these groups vary as a result of this.

The diverse diets of microbats reflect having dentition, or cheek teeth, that display a morphology derived from dilambdodont teeth, which are characterized by a W-shaped ectoloph, or stylar shelf. A W-shaped dilambdodont upper molar includes a metacone and paracone, which are located at the bottom of the “W”; while the rest of the “W” is formed by crests that run from the metacone and paracone to the cusps of the stylar self.

Microbats display differences between the size and shape of their canines and molars, in addition to having distinctive variations among their skull features that contribute to their ability to feed effectively. Frugivorous microbats have small stylar shelf areas, short molariform rows, and wide palates and faces. In addition to having wide faces, frugivorous microbats have short skulls, which place the teeth closer to the fulcrum of the jaw lever, allowing an increase in jaw strength. Frugivorous microbats also possess a different pattern on their molars compared to carnivorous, insectivorous, nectarivorous, and sanguinivorous microbats. In contrast, insectivorous microbats are characterized by having larger, but fewer teeth, long canines, and shortened third upper molars; while carnivorous microbats have large upper molars. Generally, microbats that are insectivores, carnivores, and frugivores have large teeth and small palates; however, the opposite is true for microbats that are nectarivores. Though differences exist between the palate and teeth sizes of microbats, the proportion of the sizes of these two structures are maintained among microbats of various sizes.

== Echolocation ==
Echolocation is the process where an animal produces a sound of certain wavelength, and then listens to and compares the reflected echoes to the original sound emitted. Bats use echolocation to form images of their surrounding environment and the organisms that inhabit it by eliciting ultrasonic waves via their larynx. The difference between the ultrasonic waves produced by the bat and what the bat hears provides the bat with information about its environment. Echolocation aids the bat in not only detecting prey, but also in orientation during flight.

=== Production of ultrasonic waves ===
Most microbats generate ultrasound with their larynx and emit the sound through their nose or mouth. Sound productions are generated from the vocal folds in mammals due to the elastic membranes that compose these folds. Vocalization requires these elastic membranes because they act as a source to transform airflow into acoustic pressure waves. Energy is supplied to the elastic membranes from the lungs, and results in the production of sound. The larynx houses the vocal cords and forms the passageway for the expiratory air that will produce sound. Microbat calls range in frequency from 14,000 to over 100,000 hertz, well beyond the range of the human ear (typical human hearing range is considered to be from 20 to 20,000 Hz). The emitted vocalizations form a broad beam of sound used to probe the environment, as well as communicate with other bats. At the molecular level, it has been found that CPLX1 is involved in this ultrasonic wave production.

=== Laryngeally echolocating microbats ===
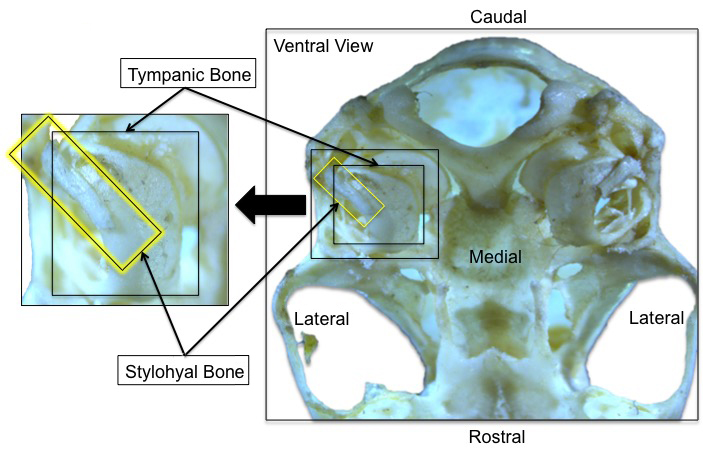
Ventral view of a Florida Freetail bat (Tadarida cyanocephala) skull, highlighting both the stylohyal and tympanic bones. Specimen from the Pacific Lutheran University Natural History collection.

Laryngeal echolocation is the dominant form of echolocation in microbats, however, it is not the only way in which microbats can produce ultrasonic waves. Excluding non-echolocating and laryngeally echolocating microbats, other species of microbats and megabats have been shown to produce ultrasonic waves by clapping their wings, clicking their tongues, or using their nose. Laryngeally echolocating bats, in general, produce ultrasonic waves with their larynx that is specialized to produce sounds of short wavelength. The larynx is located at the cranial end of the trachea and is surrounded by cricothyroid muscles and thyroid cartilage. For reference, in humans, this is the area where the Adam's apple is located. Phonation of ultrasonic waves is produced through the vibrations of the vocal membranes in the expiratory air. The intensity that these vocal folds vibrate at varies with activity and between bat species. A characteristic of laryngeally echolocating microbats that distinguishes them from other echolocating microbats is the articulation of their stylohyal bone with their tympanic bone. The stylohyal bones are part of the hyoid apparatus that help support the throat and larynx. The tympanic bone forms the floor of the middle ear. In addition to the connection between the stylohyal bone and the tympanic bone as being an indicator of laryngeally echolocating microbats, another definitive marker is the presence of a flattened and expanded stylohyal bone at the cranial end.

Microbats that laryngeally echolocate must be able to distinguish between the differences of the pulse that they produce and the returning echo that follows by being able to process and understand the ultrasonic waves at a neuronal level, in order to accurately obtain information about their surrounding environment and orientation in it. The connection between the stylohyal bone and the tympanic bone enables the bat to neurally register the outgoing and incoming ultrasonic waves produced by the larynx. Furthermore, the stylohyal bones connect the larynx to the tympanic bones via a cartilaginous or fibrous connection (depending on the species of bat). Mechanically the importance of this connection is that it supports the larynx by anchoring it to the surrounding cricothyroid muscles, as well as draws it closer to the nasal cavity during phonation. The stylohyal bones are often reduced in many other mammals, however, they are more prominent in laryngeally echolocating bats and are part of the mammalian hyoid apparatus. The hyoid apparatus functions in breathing, swallowing, and phonation in microbats as well as other mammals. An important feature of the bony connection in laryngeally echolocating microbats is the extended articulation of the ventral portion of the tympanic bones and the proximal end of the stylohyal bone that bends around it to make this connection.

== Classification ==
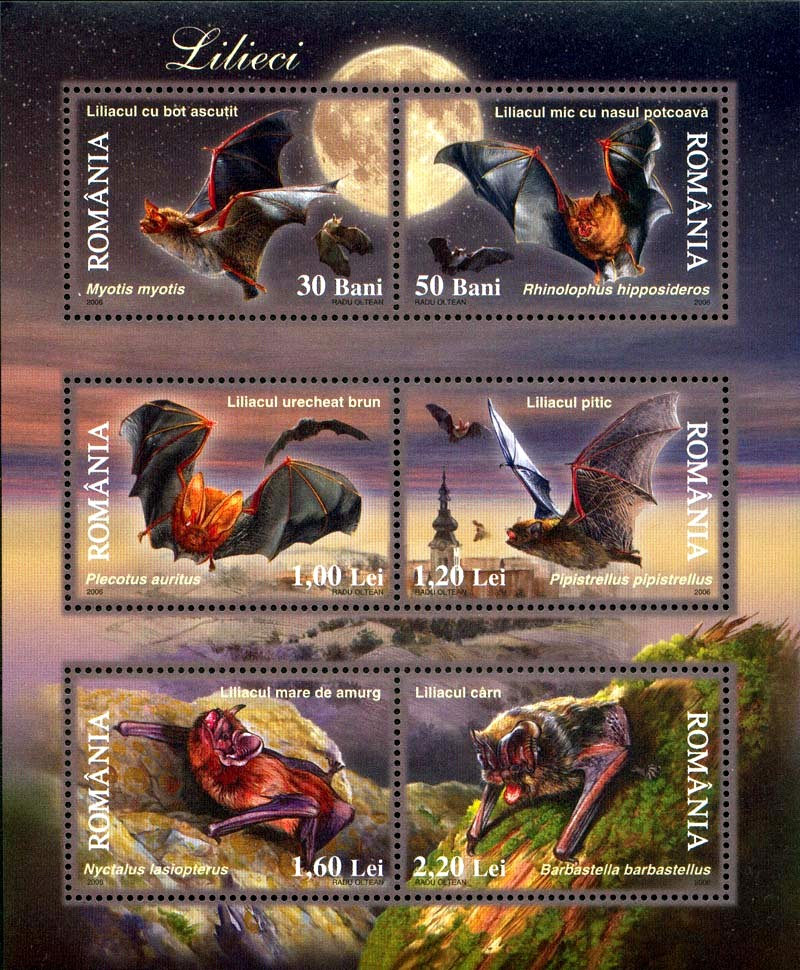
A series of Romanian postage stamps. The bats depicted are (from top to bottom and left to right): the greater mouse-eared bat, the lesser horseshoe bat, the brown long-eared bat, the common pipistrelle, the greater noctule bat, and the barbastelle, Romanian post miniature sheet, 2003

While bats have been traditionally divided into megabats and microbats, recent molecular evidence has shown the superfamily Rhinolophoidea to be more genetically related to megabats than to microbats, indicating the microbats are paraphyletic. To resolve the paraphyly of microbats, the Chiroptera were redivided into suborders Yangochiroptera (which includes Nycteridae, vespertilionoids, noctilionoids, and emballonuroids) and Yinpterochiroptera, which includes megabats, rhinopomatids, Rhinolophidae, and Megadermatidae.

This is the classification according to Simmons and Geisler (1998):

Superfamily Emballonuroidea

- Family Emballonuridae (sac-winged bats or sheath-tailed bats)

Superfamily Rhinopomatoidea

- Family Rhinopomatidae (mouse-tailed bats)
- Family Craseonycteridae (bumblebee bat or Kitti's hog-nosed bat)

Superfamily Rhinolophoidea

- Family Rhinolophidae (horseshoe bats)
- Family Nycteridae (hollow-faced bats or slit-faced bats)
- Family Megadermatidae (false vampires)

Superfamily Vespertilionoidea

- Family Vespertilionidae (vesper bats or evening bats)

Superfamily Molossoidea

- Family Molossidae (free-tailed bats)
- Family Antrozoidae (pallid bats)

Superfamily Nataloidea

- Family Natalidae (funnel-eared bats)
- Family Myzopodidae (sucker-footed bats)
- Family Thyropteridae (disk-winged bats)
- Family Furipteridae (smoky bats)

Superfamily Noctilionoidea

- Family Noctilionidae (bulldog bats or fisherman bats)
- Family Mystacinidae (New Zealand short-tailed bats)
- Family Mormoopidae (ghost-faced bats or moustached bats)
- Family Phyllostomidae (leaf-nosed bats)
