= Sucker (zoology) =

Specialised attachment organ of an animal

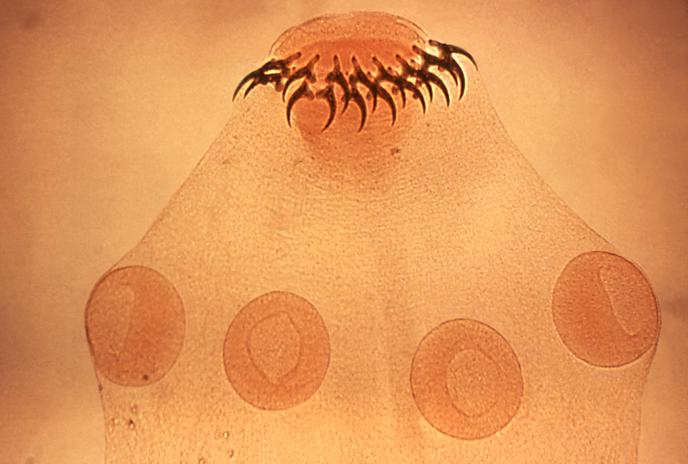
Scolex of Taenia solium with four suckers and two rows of hooks

A sucker in zoology is a specialised attachment organ of an animal. It acts as an adhesion device in parasitic worms, several flatworms, cephalopods, certain fishes, amphibians, and bats. It is a muscular structure for suction on a host or substrate. In parasitic annelids, flatworms and roundworms, suckers are the organs of attachment to the host tissues. In tapeworms and flukes, they are a parasitic adaptation for attachment on the internal tissues of the host, such as intestines and blood vessels. In roundworms and flatworms they serve as attachment between individuals particularly during mating. In annelids, a sucker can be both a functional mouth and a locomotory organ. The structure and number of suckers are often used as basic taxonomic diagnosis between different species, since they are unique in each species. In tapeworms there are two distinct classes of suckers, namely "bothridia" for true suckers, and "bothria" for false suckers. In digeneal flukes there are usually an oral sucker at the mouth and a ventral sucker (or acetabulum) posterior to the mouth. Roundworms have their sucker just in front of the anus; hence it is often called a pre-anal sucker.

Among chordates, some fishes and mammals have suckers, which are used as a holdfast to substrata. Among fishes some members of the order Perciformes have modified fins that form a sucker. Some bats, the Madagascar and the Western sucker-footed bat have unusual suckers on their limbs that are useful during roosting. Some amphibians such as the frog have adhesive pads on their toes to help with their locomotion.

== In helminths ==
=== Turbellaria ===
In the class Turbellaria, only the species of the order Temnocephalida are parasitic and possess an adhesive disc. The sucker is present at the posterior end on the ventral side. It is lined with syncytial epidermis and numerous microvilli. Beneath the apical membrane are many vacuoles and dense bodies. It is attached to the body through a short stalk. Densely packed muscle fibres link the sucker with the main body through the stalk.

=== Udonellidae ===
Udonellids are symbiotic to fishes, on which body they remain attached using a sucker. The sucker is a membranous extension of the posterior end. It has an indistinct stalk and the anterior surface is lined with microvilli. Some portion of the tegument has interconnected surface extension appearing as loops. The interior is divided into several compartments which are surrounded by interconnected connective tissue. The connective tissues are linked with muscles that extend into the main body.

=== Tapeworms ===
In tapeworms, the sucker is called bothridium (plural "bothridia") to differentiate it from the sucker-like protrusion called bothrium in some species.

=== Flukes ===
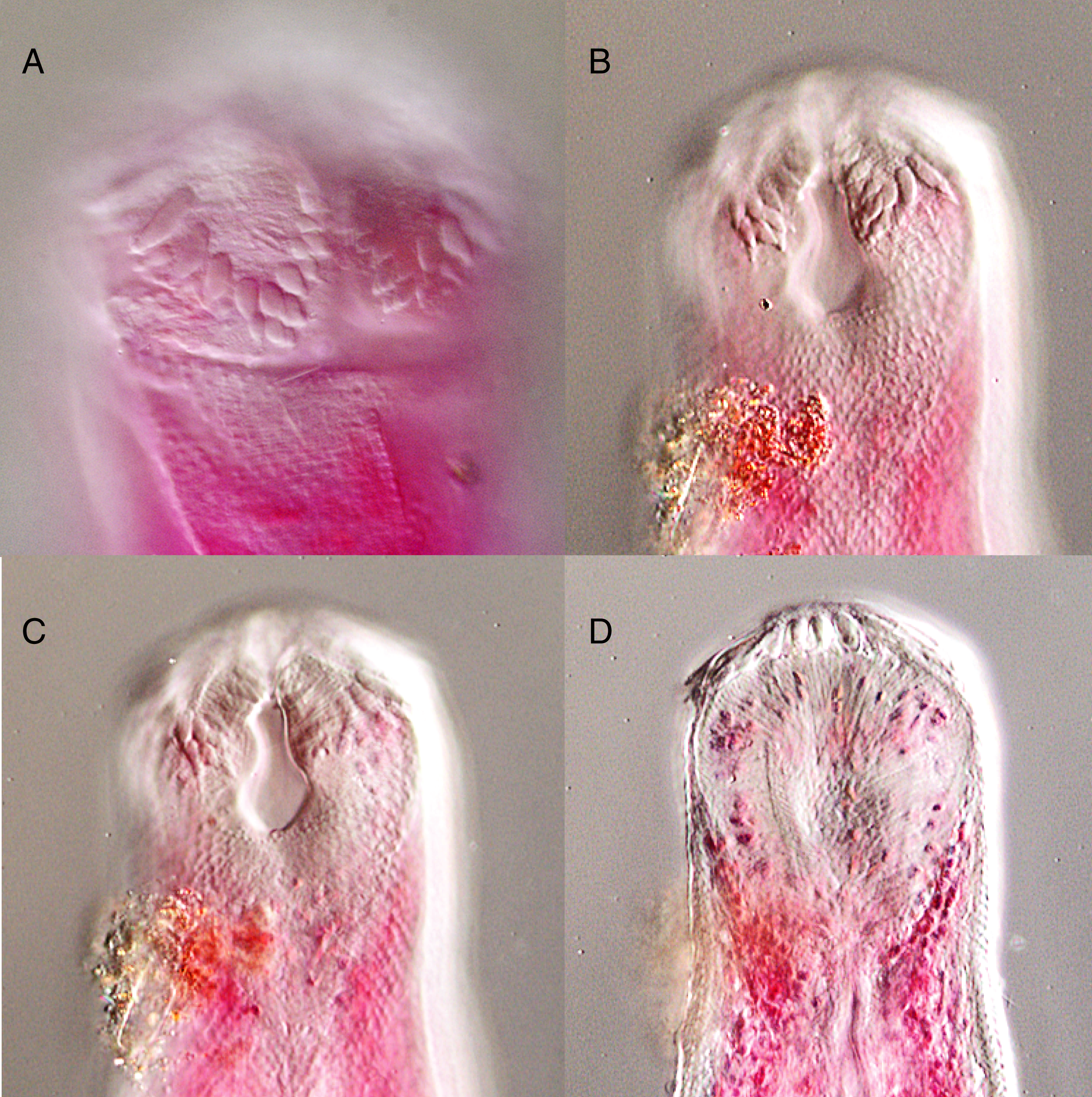
Various aspects of anterior sucker of a zoogonid digenean

Among the flukes belonging to class Digenea, there are two suckers, namely an oral sucker and a ventral sucker (often called acetabulum). The oral sucker is at the tip of the anterior body and directly surrounds the mouth. The ventral sucker is located halfway to the middle of the body on the ventral side. They are both used for attachment to intestinal wall and blood vessels. The detailed structure of the suckers, presence or absence of hooks, and their exact position on the body are major taxonomic keys between species.

In the class Monogenea, oral suckers are present in worm parasites of the order Mazocraeidea. They are known to have muscular, glandular, and sensory components thought to play some role in blood feeding. In other species like Anoplodiscus, the sucker is a posterior extension, connected to the main body through a small stalk. The surface is profusely covered with microvilli. It is used for symbiotic association with fishes.

=== Nematodes ===
Parasitic roundworms such as species of Ascaridia and Heterakis possess a single sucker at the posterior end of the body, just in front of anus, hence is often called a pre-anal sucker. Only the male roundworms have them, and are used for attachment to female during mating. The sucker is a protruding cuticle and circular in shape.

== In annelids ==
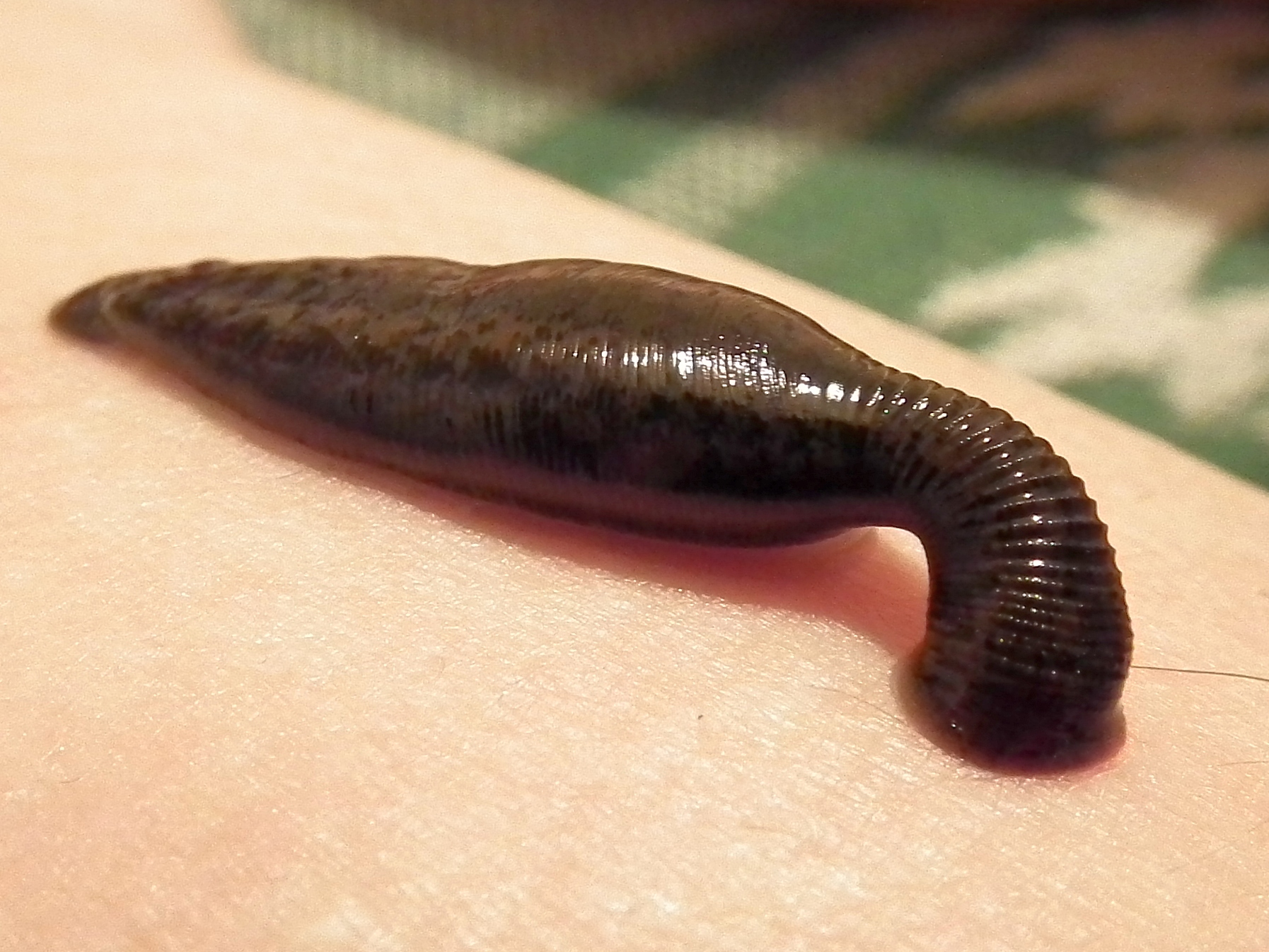
A medicinal leech with its oral sucker

Annelid worms such as leeches all have an anterior (oral) sucker formed from the first six segments of their body, which is used to connect to a host for feeding. It also releases an anaesthetic to prevent the host from feeling pain while it sucks blood. They use a combination of mucus and suction (caused by concentric muscles in those six segments) to stay attached and secrete an anti-clotting enzyme, hirudin, into the host's blood stream. The medicinal leech (Hirudo medicinalis) has two suckers, one at each end, called the anterior and posterior sucker. The posterior is mainly used for leverage while the anterior sucker, consisting of the jaw and teeth, is where the feeding takes place. During locomotion directional movement of the body is done by successive attachment and detachment of the oral sucker and the acetabulum.

== Molluscs ==
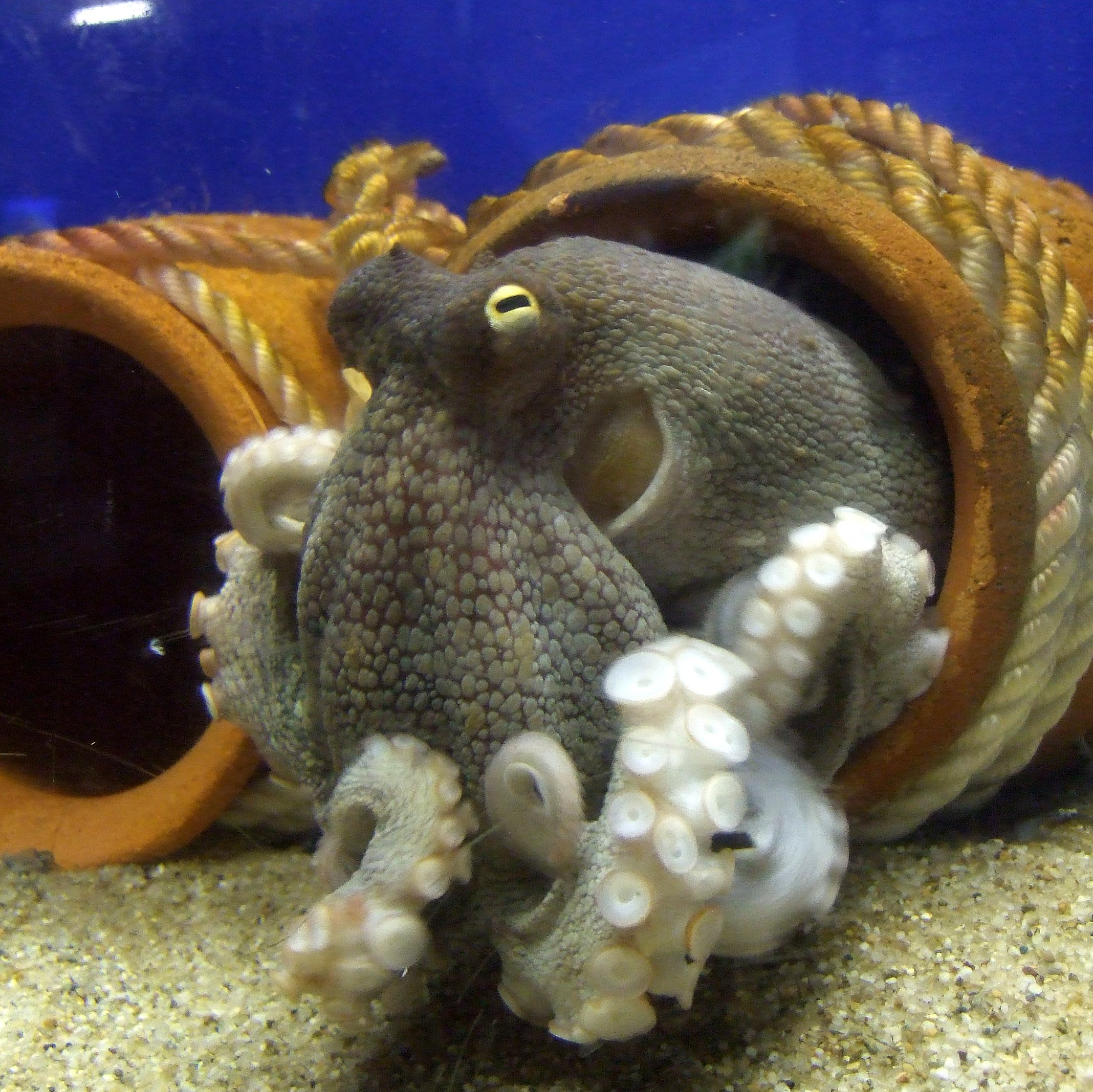
An octopus displaying its suckers

Cephalopods are characterised by elongated appendages known as cephalopod limbs for locomotion and grasping objects. There are two main types: arms, such as in octopus, bearing numerous suckers along its ventral surface; and tentacles, such as in squid and cuttlefish, having a single sucker at the tip. Each sucker is a circular and bowl-like curved disc. It in turn has two distinct parts: an outer shallow cavity called infundibulum and a central hollow cavity called acetabulum. Both these structures are thick muscles, and are covered with chitinous cuticle to make a protective surface. It is used for grasping substratum, catching prey and for locomotory accessory. When the sucker attaches itself on an object, the infundibulum mainly provides adhesion while the central acetabulum is quite free. The sequential muscle contraction the infundibulum and acetabulum causes attachment and detachment.

== In fish ==
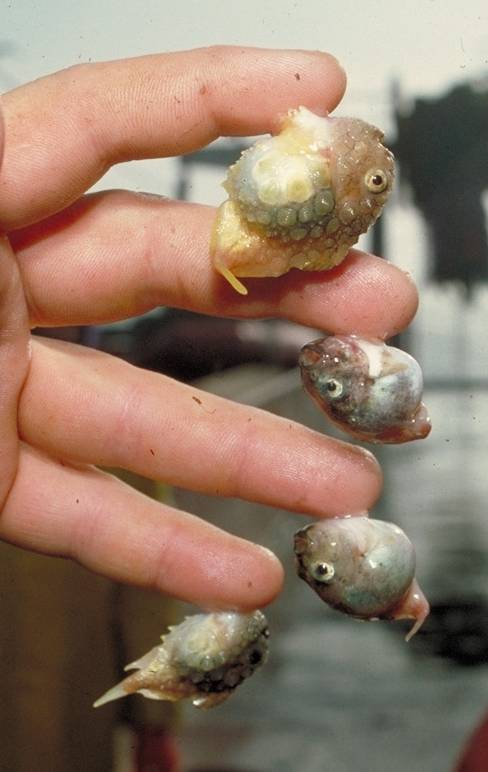
Eumicrotremus phrynoides and Eumicrotremus orbis – lumpsuckers demonstrating adhesive pelvic discs.

Gobies, remoras and lumpsuckers have suckers which are modified fins. These fishes use their suckers to cling to substrata or to bigger fishes. In gobies the disc-shaped sucker is formed from fused pelvic fins. Amphidromous gobies particularly use their suckers for climbing through waterfalls during their developmental migrations. In remoras the sucker is a modified dorsal fin. In lumpsuckers, also known as lumpfish, the sucker is formed from modified pelvic fins, located ventrally, and behind the pectoral fins.

A fish family the Catostomidae are known as suckers. These fish have a suckermouth.

== In bats ==
Certain species of bats such as Madagascar sucker-footed bat and Western sucker-footed bat, are generally called "sucker-footed bats" because of suckers on their limbs. They are members of the family Myzopodidae and endemic to Madagascar. They have small cups of suckers on their wrists and ankles. They roost inside the rolled leaves of palm trees, using their suckers to attach themselves to the smooth surface.
