= Basal (phylogenetics) =

Root of a phylogenetic tree

In phylogenetics, basal is the direction of the base (or root) of a rooted phylogenetic tree or cladogram. The term may be more strictly applied only to nodes adjacent to the root, or more loosely applied to nodes regarded as being close to the root. Extant taxa that lie on branches connecting directly to the root are not more closely related to the root than any other extant taxa.

While there must always be two or more equally "basal" clades sprouting from the root of every cladogram, those clades may differ widely in taxonomic rank, (Note: Meaning the lowest taxonomic ranks of the respective clades; the highest ranks should be the same (assuming they are ranked).) species diversity, or both. (Note: See the Amborella example, in which one basal clade is a single extant species (that is also the sole living representative of an order, Amborellales). Meanwhile, the other (unranked) sister basal clade has about 250,000 species.) If C is a basal clade within D that has the lowest rank of all basal clades within D, (Note: For example, C might be a genus and the other basal clade(s) might have the higher ranks of subfamily or family.) C may be described as the basal taxon of that rank within D. (Note: In the great apes example, Gorilla is the basal genus of subfamily Homininae, while Pongo is the basal genus of family Hominidae. The two basal clades of the latter both have the highest rank of subfamily, i.e. Homininae and Ponginae.) The concept of a 'key innovation' implies some degree of correlation between evolutionary innovation and diversification. (Note: Greater diversification of a clade may also be associated with colonization of a new land mass, especially if larger or less competitive than the ancestral land mass; see the coral snake, marsupial and noctilionoid bat examples.) However, such a correlation does not make a given case predicable, so ancestral characters should not be imputed to the members of a less species-rich basal clade without additional evidence. (Note: For example, the giant panda represents the most basal extant species, genus and subfamily within Ursidae, but its specializations for a bamboo diet are not ancestral ursid characters.)

In general, clade A is more basal than clade B if B is a subgroup of the sister group of A or of A itself. (Note: That is, in the diagram below, both basal clades #1 and #2 are more basal than non-basal clade #1, which in turn is more basal than non-basal clades #2 and #3.) In the context of large groups, the term "basal" is often used loosely to refer to positions closer to the root than the majority, and in such cases, expressions like "very basal" can appear. A 'core clade' refers to the grouping that encompasses all constituent clades except for the basal clade(s) of the lowest rank within a larger clade, exemplified by core eudicots. No extant taxon is closer to the root of life than any other.

== Usage ==
A basal group in the stricter sense forms a sister group to the rest of the larger clade, as in the following case:

- Root
  - Basal clade #1
  - - Non-basal clade #1
    - - Non-basal clade #2
      - Non-basal clade #3

While it is easy to identify a basal clade in such a cladogram, the appropriateness of such an identification is dependent on the accuracy and completeness of the diagram. It is often assumed in this example that the terminal branches of the cladogram depict all the extant taxa of a given rank within the clade; this is one reason the term basal is highly deceptive, as the lack of additional species in one clade is taken as evidence of morphological affinity with ancestral taxa. Additionally, this qualification does not ensure that the diversity of extinct taxa (which may be poorly known) is represented.

In phylogenetics, the term basal cannot be objectively applied to clades of organisms, but tends to be applied selectively and more controversially to groups or lineages (Note: Since a lineage is a linear chain of descent, all lineages within a clade can be traced back not only to the root, but to the origin of life. Thus, from a phylogenetic standpoint, the notion of a lineage being basal is nonsensical. However, in genetics, basal lineage refers to a lineage connecting a common ancestor with a single variant allele to a branch ancestor with two descendant variants.) thought to possess ancestral characters, or to such presumed ancestral traits themselves. In describing characters, "ancestral" or "plesiomorphic" are preferred to "basal" or "primitive", the latter of which may carry false connotations of inferiority or a lack of complexity. The terms ''deep-branching'' or ''early-branching'' are similar in meaning, and equally may misrepresent extant taxa that lie on branches connecting directly to the root node as having more ancestral character states.

Despite the ubiquity of the usage of basal, systematists try to avoid its usage because its application to extant groups is unnecessary and misleading. The term is more often applied when one branch (the one deemed "basal") is less diverse than another branch (this being the situation in which one would expect to find a basal taxon of lower minimum rank). The term may be equivocal in that it also refers to the direction of the root of the tree, which represents a hypothetical ancestor; this consequently may inaccurately imply that the sister group of a more species-rich clade displays ancestral features. An extant basal group may or may not resemble the last common ancestor of a larger clade to a greater degree than other groups, and is separated from that ancestor by the same amount of time as all other extant groups. However, there are cases where the unusually small size of a sister group does indeed correlate with an unusual number of ancestral traits, as in Amborella (see below). This is likely a source of the mis-use of the term. Other famous examples of this phenomenon are the oviparous reproduction and nipple-less lactation of monotremes, a clade of mammals with just five species, and the archaic anatomy of the tuatara, a basal clade of lepidosaurian with a single species.

== Examples ==
=== Flowering plants ===
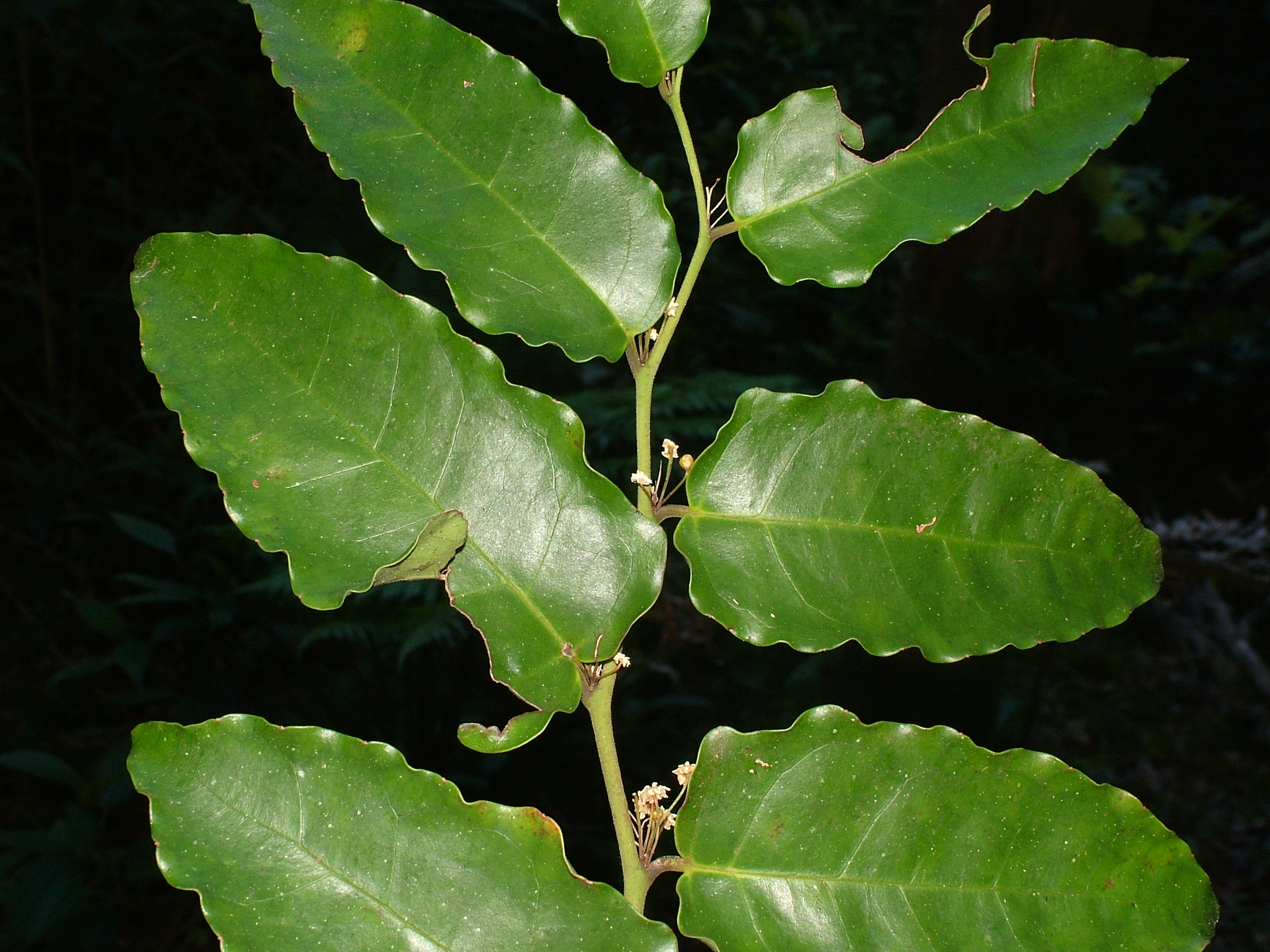
Amborella trichopoda, the most basal extant angiosperm

The flowering plant family Amborellaceae, restricted to New Caledonia in the southwestern Pacific, (Note: New Caledonia is viewed as a refugium; i.e., in this case the geographic location of the basal clade is not thought to provide evidence for the locale in which angiosperms originated.) is a basal clade of extant angiosperms, consisting of the most species, genus, family and order within the group that are sister to all other angiosperms (out of a total of about 250,000 angiosperm species). The traits of Amborella trichopoda are regarded as providing significant insight into the evolution of flowering plants; for example, it has "the most primitive wood (consisting only of tracheids), of any living angiosperm" as well as "simple, separate flower parts of indefinite numbers, and unsealed carpels". However, those traits are a mix of archaic and apomorphic (derived) features that have only been sorted out via comparison with other angiosperms and their positions within the phylogenetic tree (the fossil record could potentially also be helpful in this respect, but is absent in this case). The cladogram below is based on Ramírez-Barahona et al. (2020), with species counts taken from the source indicated.

- Angiosperms
  - Amborellales (1 species)
  - - Nymphaeales (about 90 species)
    - - Austrobaileyales (about 95 species)
      - - - Magnoliids (about 9,000 species)
          - - Chloranthales (about 80 species)
            - Monocots (about 70,000 species)
        - - Ceratophyllales (about 6 species)
          - Eudicots (about 175,000 species)

=== Great apes ===
Within the great apes, gorillas (eastern and western) are a sister group to chimpanzees, bonobos and humans. These five species form a clade, the subfamily Homininae (African apes), of which Gorilla has been termed the basal genus. However, if the analysis is not restricted to genera, the Homo plus Pan clade is also basal.

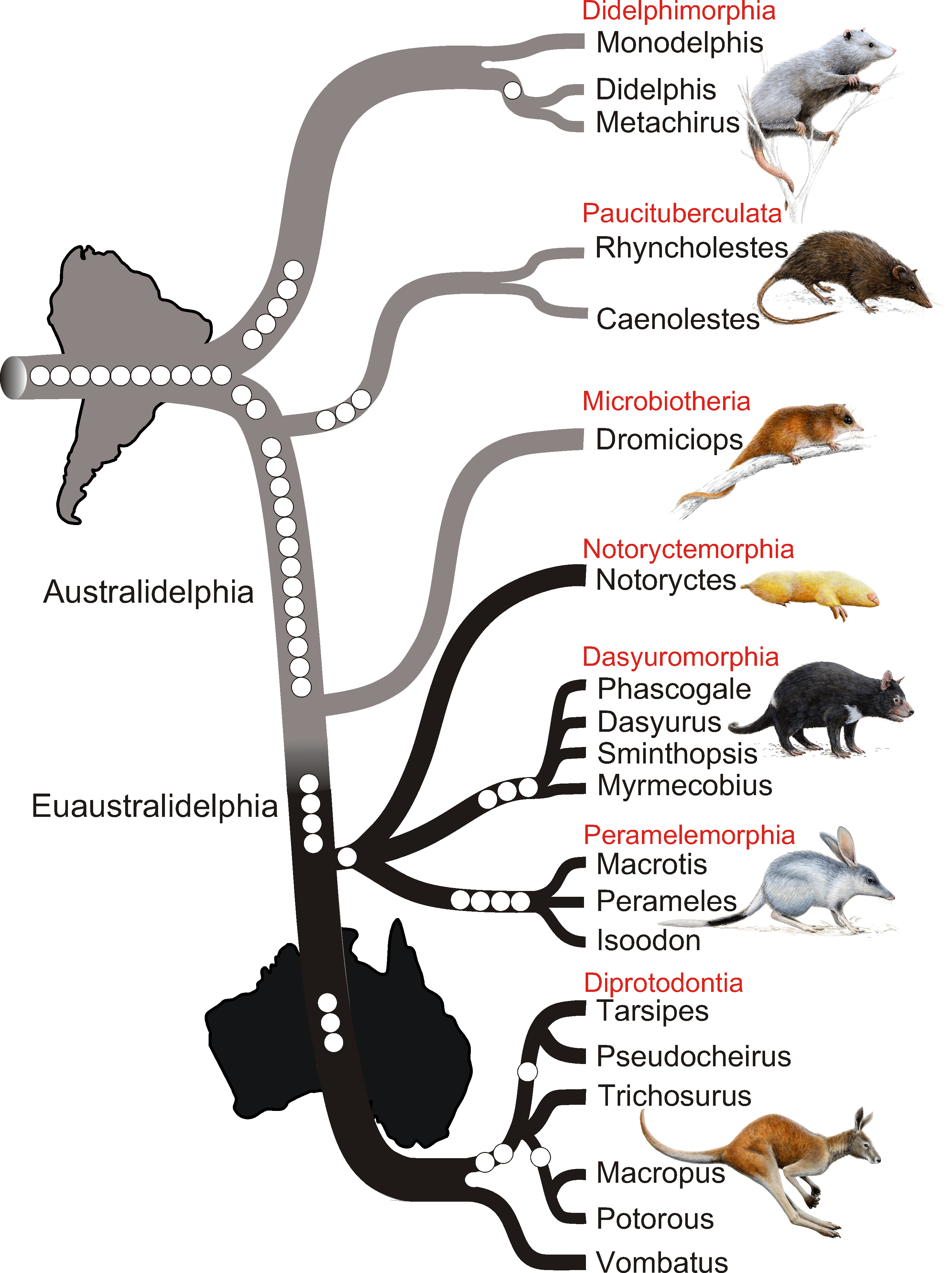
The phylogenetic tree of marsupials derived from retroposon data shows the basal position of South American Didelphimorphia within Marsupialia, and the basal position of South American Dromiciops within otherwise Australasian Australidelphia.

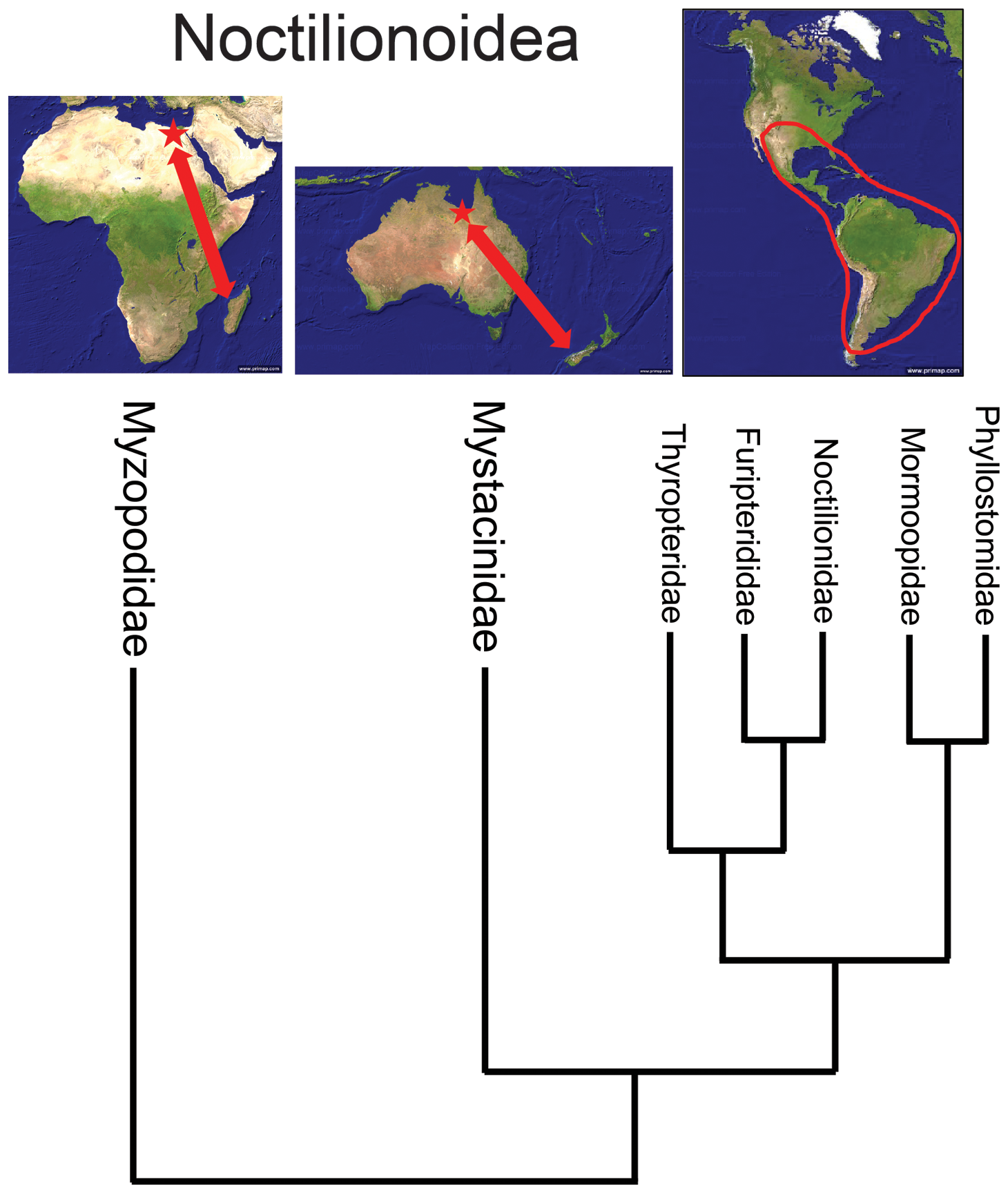
Relationship of biogeography and phylogeny of bat superfamily Noctilionoidea inferred from nuclear DNA sequence data, showing the basal position of the Malagasy family Myzopodidae. Locations with only fossil members are indicated by red stars.

- Homininae
  - - Humans (Homo sapiens)
    - - Bonobos (Pan paniscus)
      - Chimpanzees (Pan troglodytes)
  - - Eastern gorillas (Gorilla beringei)
    - Western gorillas (Gorilla gorilla)

Moreover, orangutans are a sister group to Homininae and are the basal genus in the great ape family Hominidae as a whole.

- Hominidae
  - Ponginae
    Orangutans (Pongo spp.)
  - Homininae
    - - Humans (Homo sapiens)
      - Chimpanzees (Pan spp.)
    - Gorillas (Gorilla spp.)

Subfamilies Homininae and Ponginae are both basal within Hominidae, but given that there are no nonbasal subfamilies in the cladogram it is unlikely the term would be applied to either. In general, a statement to the effect that one group (e.g., orangutans) is basal, or branches off first, within another group (e.g., Hominidae) may not make sense unless the appropriate taxonomic level(s) (genus, in this case) is specified. If that level cannot be specified (i.e., if the clade in question is unranked) a more detailed description of the relevant sister groups may be needed. As can be seen, the term is not reflective of ancestral states or proximity to the common ancestor of extant species.

In this example, orangutans differ from the other genera in their Asian range. This fact plus their basal status provides a hint that the most recent common ancestor of extant great apes may have been Eurasian (see below), a suggestion that is consistent with other evidence. (Of course, lesser apes are entirely Asiatic.) However, orangutans also differ from African apes in their more highly arboreal lifestyle, a trait generally viewed as ancestral among the apes.

== Relevance to biogeographic history ==
Given that the deepest phylogenetic split in a group is likely to have occurred early in its history, identification of the most basal subclade(s) in a widely dispersed taxon or clade can provide valuable insight into its region of origin; however, the lack of additional species in a clade is not evidence that it carries the ancestral state for most traits. Most deceptively, people often believe that the direction of migration away from the area of origin can also be inferred (as in the Amaurobioides and Noctilionoidea cases below). As with all other traits, the phylogeographic location of one clade that connects to the root does not provide information about the ancestral state. Examples where such unjustified inferences may have been made include:

- Spiders of the genus Amaurobioides are present in South Africa, Australia, New Zealand and Chile. The most basal clade is South African; DNA sequence evidence indicates that after their South American ancestors reached South Africa, they dispersed eastward all the way back to South America over an interval of about 8 million years.
- Iguanid lizards (sensu lato) are distributed throughout the Americas, on Madagascar, and on Fiji and Tonga in the western South Pacific. The Malagasy forms (Opluridae) were previously thought to be basal, with an estimated divergence date from the others of ~162 million years, not long before the time of Madagascar's separation from Africa. This suggested that iguanids once had a widespread Gondwanan distribution; after the Malagasy and New World representatives were separated by vicariance, less isolated Old World iguanids became extinct through competition with other lizard groups (e.g., agamids). In contrast, western Pacific iguanids are nested deeply within American iguanids, having apparently colonized their isolated range after an epic 10,000 km rafting event. However, a 2022 study found oplurids to be closely allied with the American iguanians Leiosauridae, having only diverged 60 million years ago following a likely rafting event of their own. Due to this, neither of the Old World "iguanids" are thought to represent basal lineages.
- Coral snakes comprise about 16 species in Asia and over 65 species in the Americas. However, none of the American clades are basal, implying that the group's ancestry was in the Old World.
- Extant australidelphian marsupials constitute about 240 species in Australasia and one species (the monito del monte) in South America. The fact that the monito del monte occupies a basal position (the most basal species, genus, family and order) in the superorder Australidelphia is an important clue that its origin was in South America. This conclusion is consistent with the fact that the South American order Didelphimorphia is basal within infraclass Marsupialia; i.e., extant marsupials as a whole also appear to have originated in South America. (Note: These conclusions have been supported by the finding of Eocene fossil remains of the microbiotherian Woodburnodon casei in Antarctica, which is presumed to have served as a way station on the migration route to Australia before the final breakup of Gondwana.) (Note: Similarly, among australobatrachian frogs, the South American family Calyptocephalellidae, with 5 extant species (living in the same Valdivian forest as the monito del monte), is basal to the Australasian families Limnodynastidae and Myobatrachidae, with about 120 extant species, suggesting a South American origin for the group. This is consistent with the finding of a fossil from the South American family in Antarctica.) (Note: Ratites may have similarly traveled overland from South America to colonize Australia; a fossil ratite is known from Antarctica, and South American rheas are more basal within the group than Australo-Pacific ratites.)
- While the bat superfamily Noctilionoidea has over 200 species in the Neotropics, two in New Zealand, and two in Madagascar, the basal position of the Malagasy family suggests, in combination with the fossil record and the next-most-basal placement of the New Zealand family, that the superfamily originated in Africa and then migrated eastward to South America, proliferating there but surviving in the Old World only in refugia.
- The genus Urocyon (gray and island foxes) is basal in the canine subfamily, suggesting a North American origin of the nearly worldwide group. This is consistent with fossil evidence indicating a North American origin for the canid family as a whole (the other two canid subfamilies, the extinct Borophaginae and Hesperocyoninae, the latter being basal in Canidae, were both endemic to North America).

== See also ==
- Primitive (phylogenetics)
