= Acetabulum (morphology) =

Acetabulum /æsɪˈtæbjʊləm/ (pl.: acetabula) in invertebrate zoology is a saucer-shaped organ of attachment in some annelid worms (like leech) and flatworms. It is a specialised sucker for parasitic adaptation in trematodes by which the worms are able to attach on the host. In annelids, it is basically a locomotory organ for attaching to a substratum. The name also applies to the suction appendage on the arms of cephalopod molluscs such as squid, octopus, cuttlefish, Nautilus, etc.

== Etymology ==
Acetabulum literally means "a small saucer for vinegar". It is derived from two Latin words acetum, meaning "vinegar", and -bulum, a suffix denoting "saucer" or "vessel" or "bowl". The name is used because of the saucer-like structure in the invertebrates.

== Structure ==
=== Annelids ===
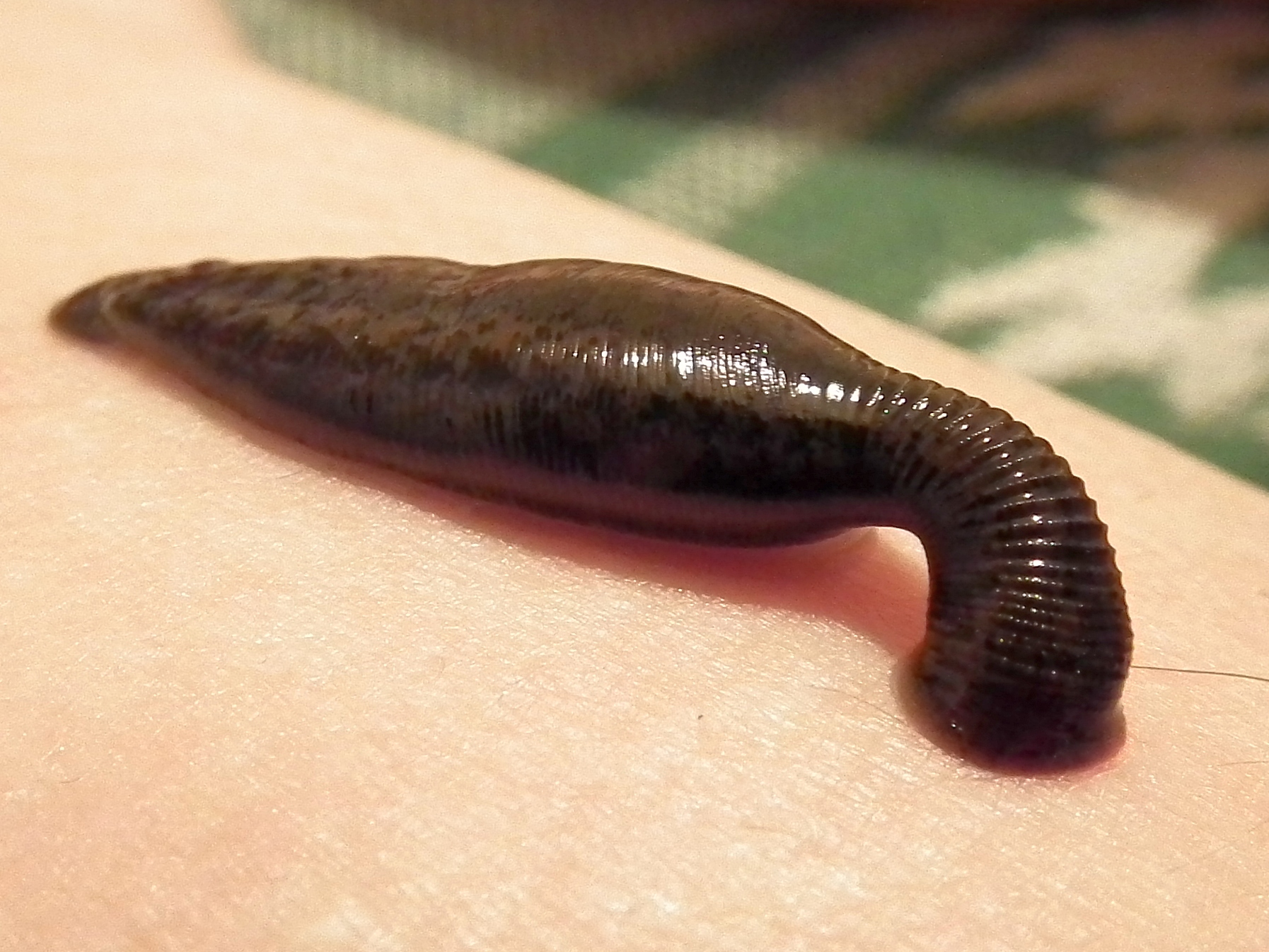
Acetabulum of leech towards the right

In leeches, acetabulum refers to the prominent posterior sucker at the extreme end of the body. In fact it forms a head-like structure, while the actual head is relatively small. It is a thick disc-shaped muscular system composed of circular, longitudinal and radial fibers.

=== Trematode ===
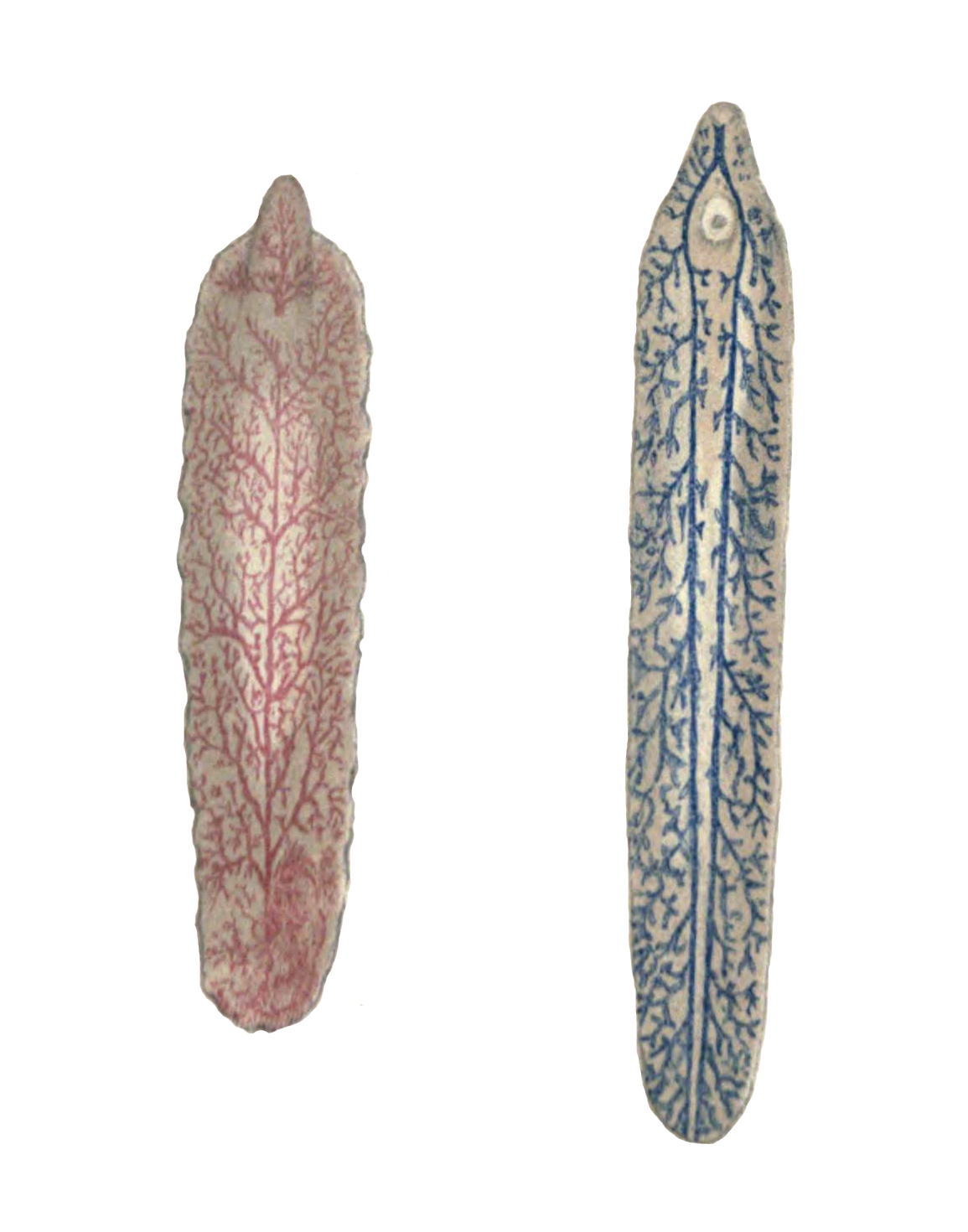
On the right, eyspot-like acetabulum of Fasciola gigantica

In flatworms, acetabulum is the ventral sucker situated towards the anterior part of the body, but behind the anterior oral sucker. It is composed of numerous spines for penetrating and gripping the host tissue. The location and structure of the acetabulum, and the pattern of the spine alignment are important diagnostic tool among trematode species.

=== Mollusc ===
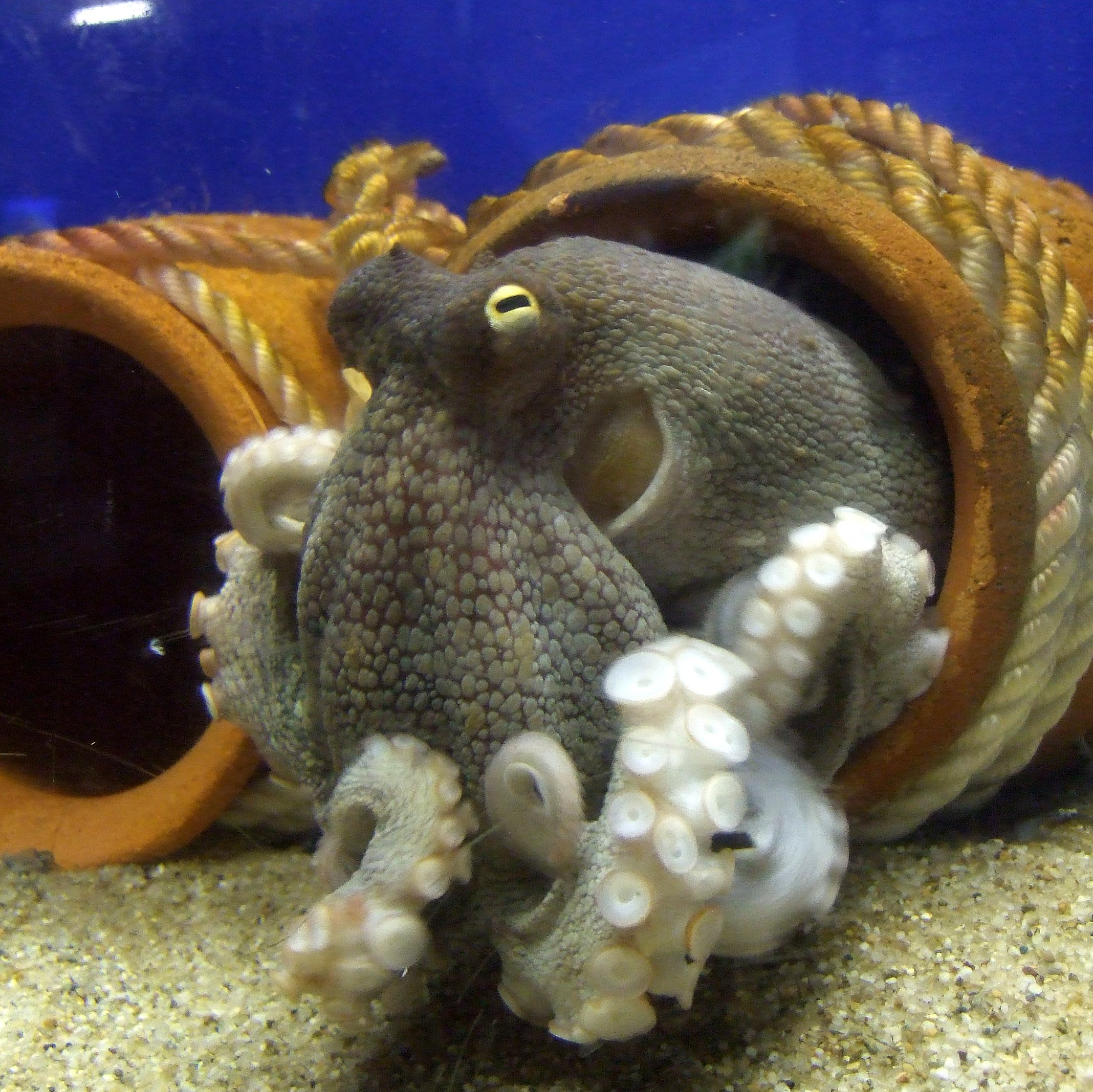
An octopus displaying its suckers with central cavity of acetabulum

Acetabulum in molluscs is a circular hollow opening on the arms. It occupies the central portion of the sucker and surrounded by a larger spherical cavity infundibulum. Both these structures are thick muscles, and the acetabulum is specifically composed of radial muscles. They are covered with chitinous cuticle to make a protective surface.

== Function ==
Acetabulum is essentially an organ of attachment. In annelids, it is used for adherence to the substratum during a looping locomotion. Annelid worms such as leeches move by repeated alternating extensions and shortenings of the body. This in turn is done by successive attachment and detachment of the oral sucker and the acetabulum. In flukes it is used for penetrating the mucosal wall of the gastrointestinal tract for maintaining its parasitic habitat. It is sensory in nature consisting of type 2 sensory receptor, which is a smooth bulb-like non-ciliated papilla.

=== Mollusc ===
Molluscans uses it for grasping substratum, catching prey and for locomotory accessory. The best studied acetabular activity is that of octopus. Octopus arms contains 200-300 independently controlled suckers that can grasp small objects and produce high adhesion forces on virtually any non-porous surface. This precise mechanism of high flexibility even has a potential mechanical applications in robotics. Each sucker is a tactile sensor for detecting the surrounding. When the sucker attaches itself on an object, the infundibulum mainly provides adhesion while the central acetabulum is quite free. This provides greater suction on the flat surface; hence, making pressure incredibly low. This is why octopus grip is exceptionally firm. Then contraction of the radial muscle of the acetabulum causes detachment of the entire sucker.
