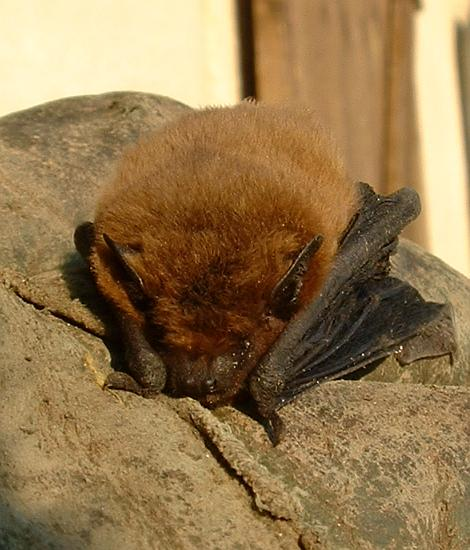
- A common pipistrelle, a member of the Yangochiroptera suborder

Scientific classification
- Kingdom: Animalia
- Phylum: Chordata
- Class: Mammalia
- Order: Chiroptera
- Suborder: Yangochiroptera; Koopman, 1984

Families
- See text

= Yangochiroptera =

Suborder of bats

Yangochiroptera, or Vespertilioniformes, is a suborder of Chiroptera that includes most of the microbat families, except the Rhinopomatidae, Rhinolophidae, Hipposideridae, Craseonycteridae and Megadermatidae. These other families, plus the megabats, are seen as part of another suborder, the Yinpterochiroptera. All bats in Yangochiroptera use laryngeal echolocation (LE), which involves the use of high-frequency sounds to detect prey and avoid obstacles.

The rationale for the Yangochiroptera taxon is primarily based on molecular genetics data. The Yangochiroptera/ Yinpterochiroptera classification remains a relatively recent proposal, which challenges the traditional view that megabats and microbats form monophyletic groups by claiming that the superfamily Rhinolophoidea is more closely related to Old World fruit bats than other microbats. Phylogenetic research using whole-genome sequences has unambiguously confirmed the monophyly of the group.

The term "Yangochiroptera" was apparently proposed in 1984 by Karl F. Koopman.

As an alternative to the subordinal names Yinpterochiroptera and Yangochiroptera, some researchers use the terms Pteropodiformes and Vespertilioniformes. Under this new proposed nomenclature, Vespertilioniformes is the suborder that would replace Yangochiroptera.

== Classification ==
Suborder Yangochiroptera (Vespertilioniformes)

- Superfamily Emballonuroidea
  - Family Myzopodidae (sucker-footed bats)
  - Family Emballonuridae (sac-winged bats)
  - Family Nycteridae (hollow-faced bats)
- Superfamily Noctilionoidea
  - Family Furipteridae (smoky bats)
  - Family Mormoopidae (ghost-faced bats)
  - Family Mystacinidae (New Zealand short-tailed bats)
  - Family Noctilionidae (bulldog bats)
  - Family Phyllostomidae (leaf-nosed bats)
  - Family Thyropteridae (disk-winged bats)
- Superfamily Vespertilionoidea
  - Family Cistugidae (wing-gland bats)
  - Family Miniopteridae (bent-winged or long winged bats)
  - Family Molossidae (free-tailed bats)
  - Family Natalidae (funnel-eared bats)
  - Family Vespertilionidae (vesper bats)
