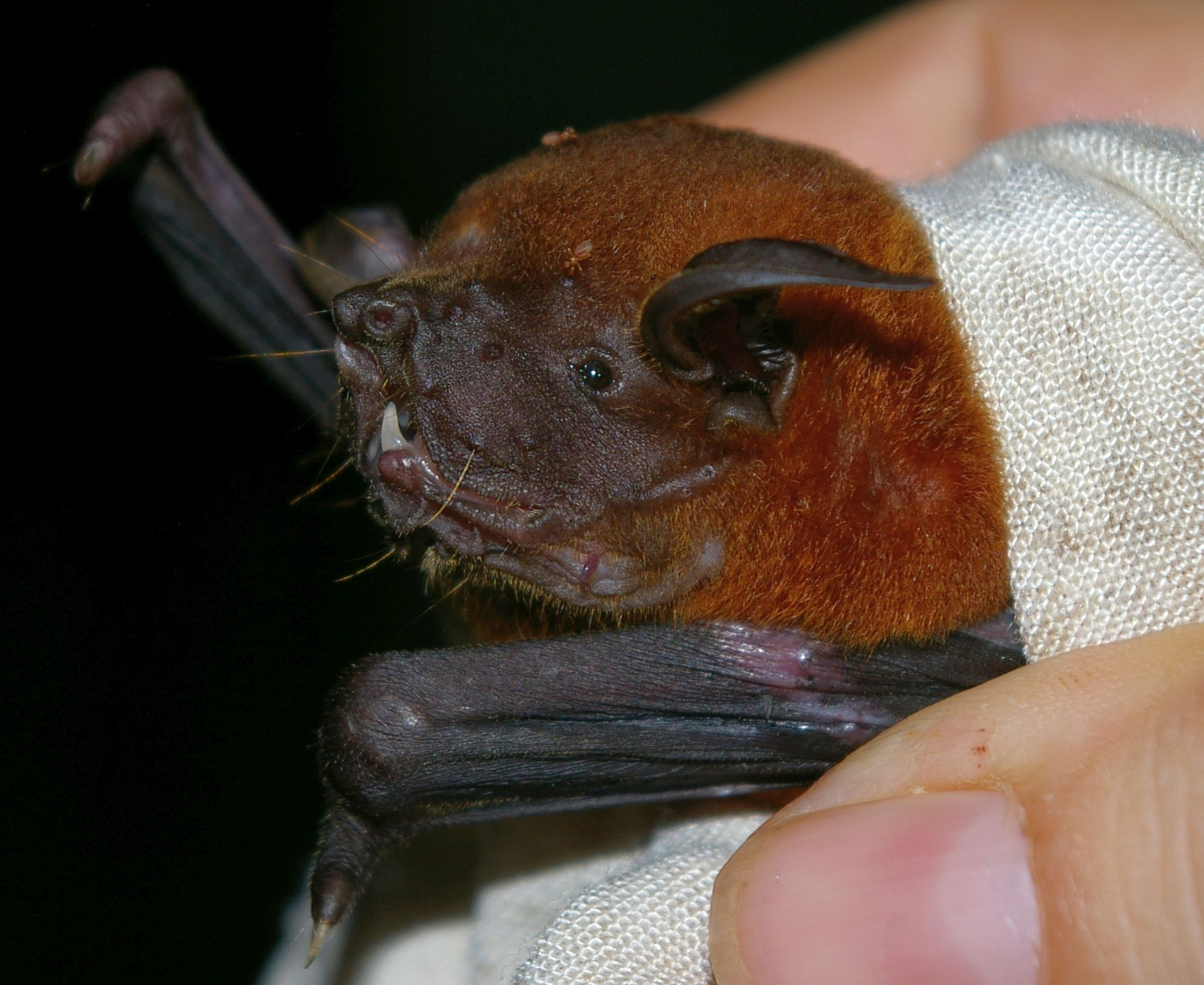

Conservation status
- Least Concern (IUCN 3.1)

Scientific classification
- Kingdom: Animalia
- Phylum: Chordata
- Class: Mammalia
- Order: Chiroptera
- Family: Noctilionidae
- Genus: Noctilio
- Species: N. albiventris

Binomial name
- Noctilio albiventris Desmarest, 1818
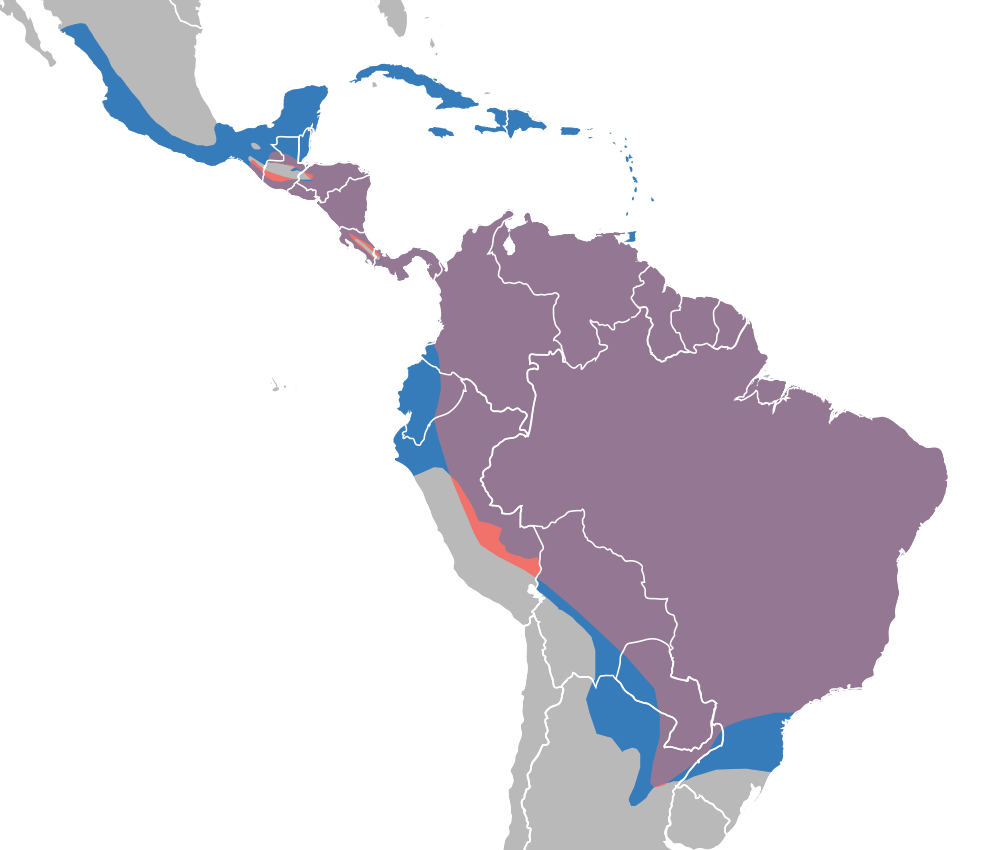
- Noctilio distribution N. albiventris in red, overlap with N. leporinus in purple

= Lesser bulldog bat =

Species of bat

The lesser bulldog bat (Noctilio albiventris) is an insectivorous and occasionally carnivorous bat of the (Neotropics), ranging through Central America and northern South America. Some unique characteristics of the bat include large feet that are used to rake the surface of water to capture prey, and precise echolocation. Occasionally, the larger bats catch and consume small fish. Due to their close proximity to urban life, there are also some interactions with humans.

== Description ==
The lesser bulldog bat is a sexually dimoprhic species with males significantly larger than females and with a more pronounced sagittal crest. Furthermore, coloration varies between individuals among the same sex, and between different populations. They have a length of about three inches (7.5 cm), a forearm length of 2 1/2 inches (6.4 cm), and weight of about one ounce (30 grams). The bats plump lips and chin that has well-developed cross ridges give rise to the bats "bulldog-like" appearance. The lesser bulldog bat has large feet that are claw-like and can be used to capture prey.

== Habitat ==
The lesser bulldog bat inhabits lowlands with tropical dry forests, rainforests, and savannahs, residing in both rural and urban areas. N. albiventris roost in caves, rock crevices, buildings, and tree holes. They tend to choose roosts close to water bodies. They are found in Argentina, Belize, Bolivia, Brazil, Costa Rica, Ecuador, El Salvador, French Guiana, Guatemala, Guyana, Honduras, Mexico, Nicaragua, Panama, Paraguay, and Peru. They are also known to roost with other bat species, namely the proboscis bat and some species of Molossus É.

Most lesser bulldog bats rest on one main roost during the daytime. Individuals usually fly out 30 minutes after subway 1-4 times each night, totalling to about 2 hours. Most of this time is spent flying in groups rather than individually.

== Feeding ==
The lesser bulldog bat predominantly feed on insects, but they are also known to consume tree pollen, fruit and fish.

Multiple hunting strategies have been observed. Individuals catch insects in flight above both terrestrial and aquatic habitats through aerial hawking. Some bats have also been seen to engage in pointed dips from high or low search flight to snatch prey using their enlarged hind feet or tail membranes. In areas with high prey density, bats may also rake the water surface with their hind claws in a behavior called gaffing.

Lesser bulldog bats are known to forage in groups. Individuals that emerge from their roost together forage together, and they are able to distinguish between their roost mates and other lesser bulldog bats that may be foraging in the same area.

== Echolocation ==
The lesser bulldog bat uses echolocation for foraging, navigation, and social communication. Juvenile bats initially emit only frequency modulation (FM) signals and later learn to produce additional pulse types including quasi-constant frequency (qCF) and combined CF-FM pulses. CF-FM signals consist of a narrowband constant frequency component followed by a broadband frequency-modulated sweep which enhances target detection and spatial resolution.

The frequency, duration, and bandwidth of their calls can be adjusted, which facilitates foraging in sub-optimal conditions. Context-dependent changes have also been hypothesized to help with communication between individuals and can convey social information. These context-dependent changes allow lesser bulldog bats to hunt more efficiently when foraging in groups. A specific call structure change, for instance, can indicate an insect swarm and its detection distance. Playback experiments show that individuals respond differently to calls from familiar versus unfamiliar conspecifics, suggesting that call structure may encode species, group, or individual identity.

While flying low over water surfaces, the bats emit echolocation calls and detect prey by interpreting returned echoes. Prey items generate acoustic disturbances over reflective backgrounds, allowing the bat to orient towards them. A similar mechanism is used for navigating complex areas.

== Development and lifespan ==
Lesser bulldog bats are seasonally reproductive, with breeding occurring primarily in late November and December. They are likely polygynous, with males mating with multiple females. The litter size typically a single pup, with one study reporting a single set of twins from 72 pregnant females.

Pups begin eating solid food at around six weeks and are often fed with pre-masticated food by their mothers. Newborn pups are unable to emit echolocation signals or detect auditory stimuli until they are a week old, after which they are recognized by their mother from unique voice signatures. Juveniles fledge at about one month of age and typically leave the roost at around three months old.

== Predators ==
Predation on bats is uncommon; however large birds are known predators. The great rufous woodcreeper has been documented invading roost sites and preying upon individuals by pecking them with their sharp beaks. Other predators of the bat include hawks, falcons, owls, and motmots.

== Human Impact ==
Urban noise may influence the behaviour of the lesser bulldog bat. Traffic noise can alter foraging activity and echolocation signals, which may interfere with prey detection in noisy environments.

N. albiventris may also interact with aquaculture systems. Although they feed primarily on insects, they may also occasionally consume small fish and have been observed foraging over artificial ponds used by Colombian fish farmers. Fish farming is widespread in the region, and predation by bats has led farmers to employ "anti-bat" measures that harm not only the lesser bulldog bat, but also other local bat species that do not consume fish.

== Gallery ==
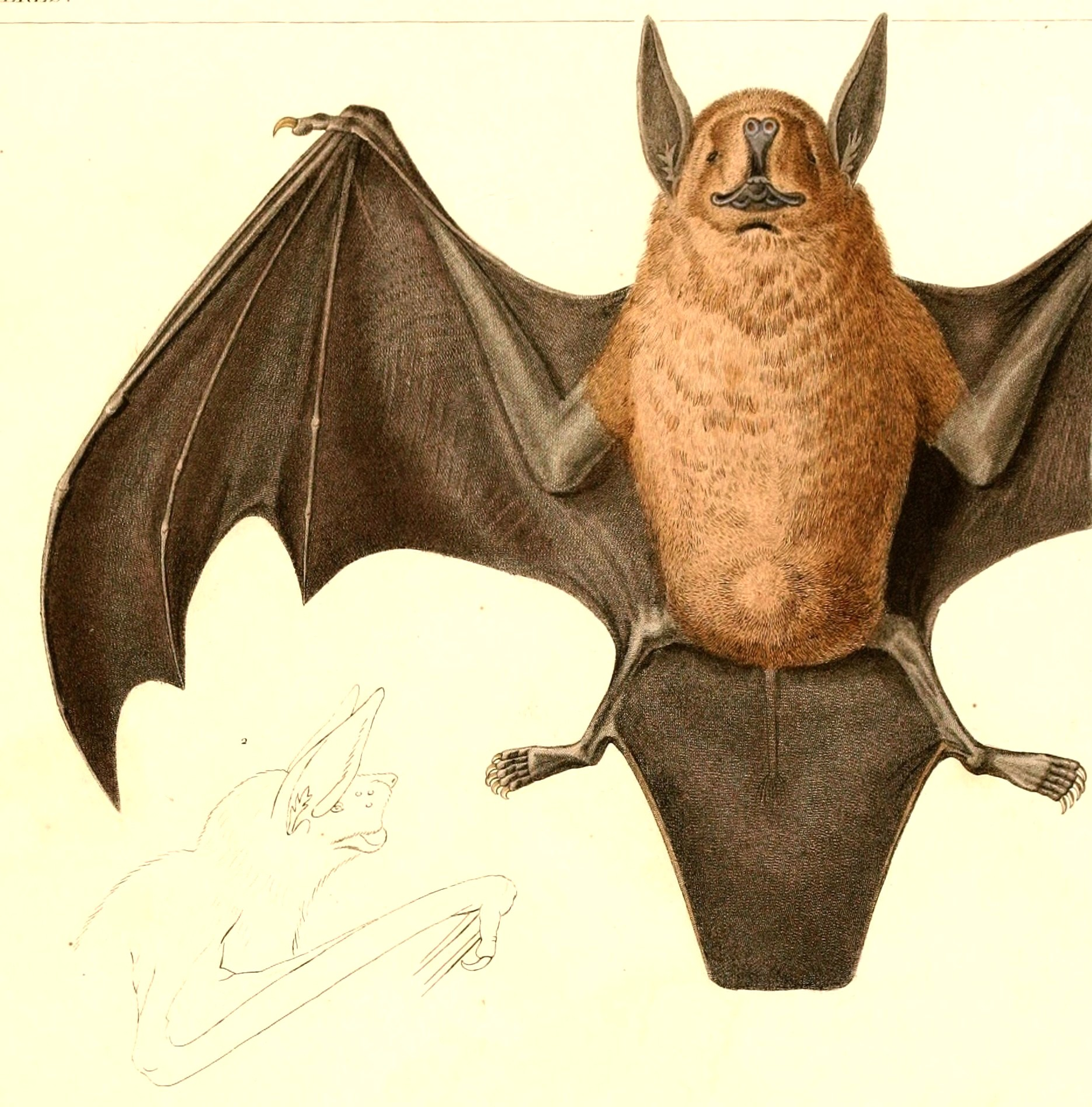
Diagram from Alcide Dessalines d'Orbigny

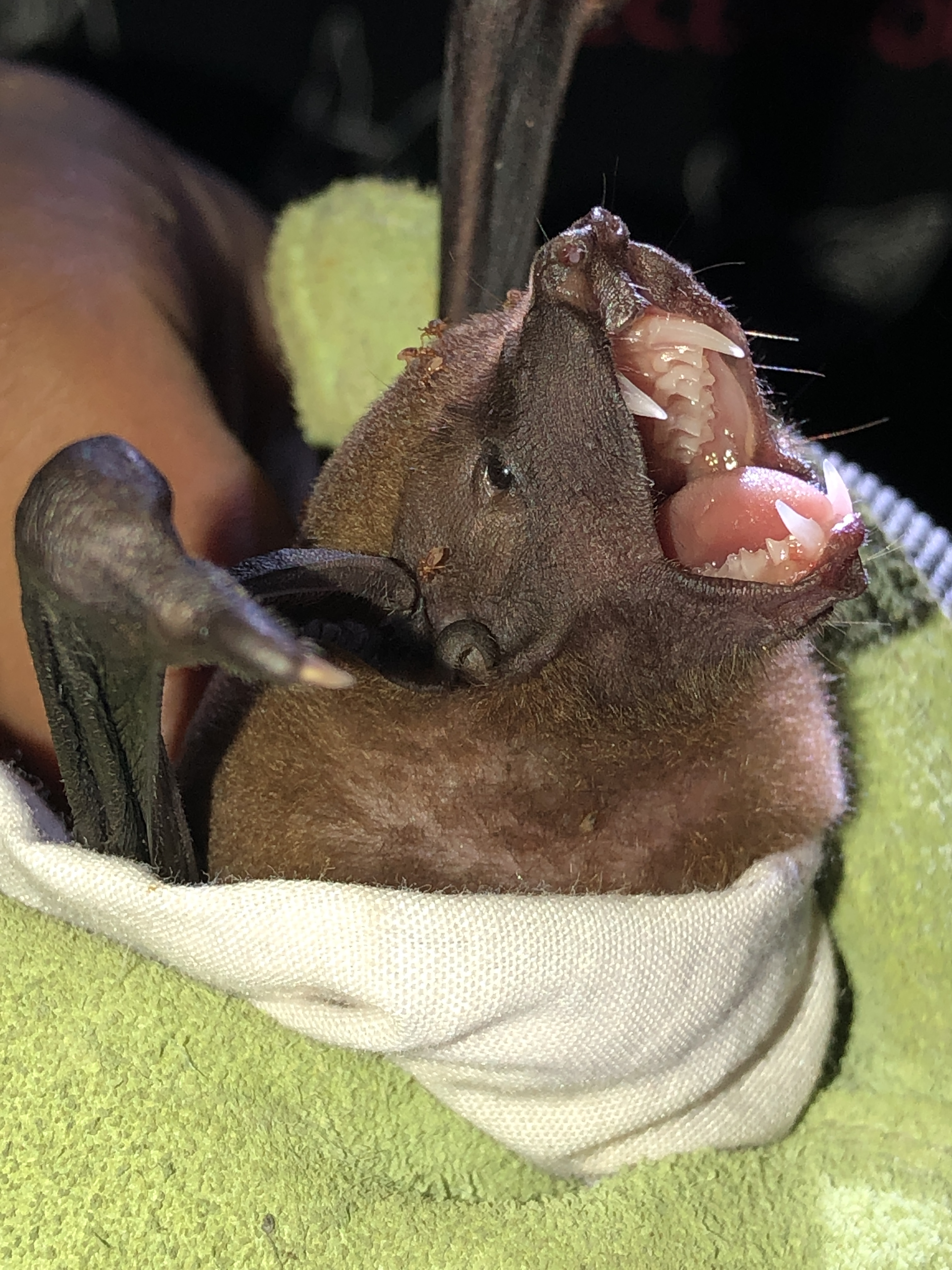
With parasites, showing its teeth, caught at the Tiputini Biodiversity Station

== See also ==
- Bulldog bat
- Microchiroptera
