= Western sucker-footed bat =

Conservation status
- Least Concern (IUCN 3.1)

Scientific classification
- Kingdom: Animalia
- Phylum: Chordata
- Class: Mammalia
- Order: Chiroptera
- Family: Myzopodidae
- Genus: Myzopoda
- Species: M. schliemanni

Binomial name
- Myzopoda schliemanni Goodman et al., 2006
- Western sucker-footed bat range

Species of bat

The western sucker-footed bat (Myzopoda schliemanni) is a bat endemic to Madagascar. Little is known about its habits, but they are assumed to be similar to those of the Madagascar sucker-footed bat.

The western sucker-footed bat is 92–107 mm (0.302–0.351 ft) long. It has large ears, and prominent suckers on its feet and thumbs. It has buff-brown upper parts, and mouse-gray underparts.

The species has been found on three lowland broad-leaf rainforest sites in north-western Madagascar. It is also found in dry deciduous forests. It feeds extensively on Lepidoptera, as well as cockroaches, and to a much smaller extent on Hymenoptera and beetles.
