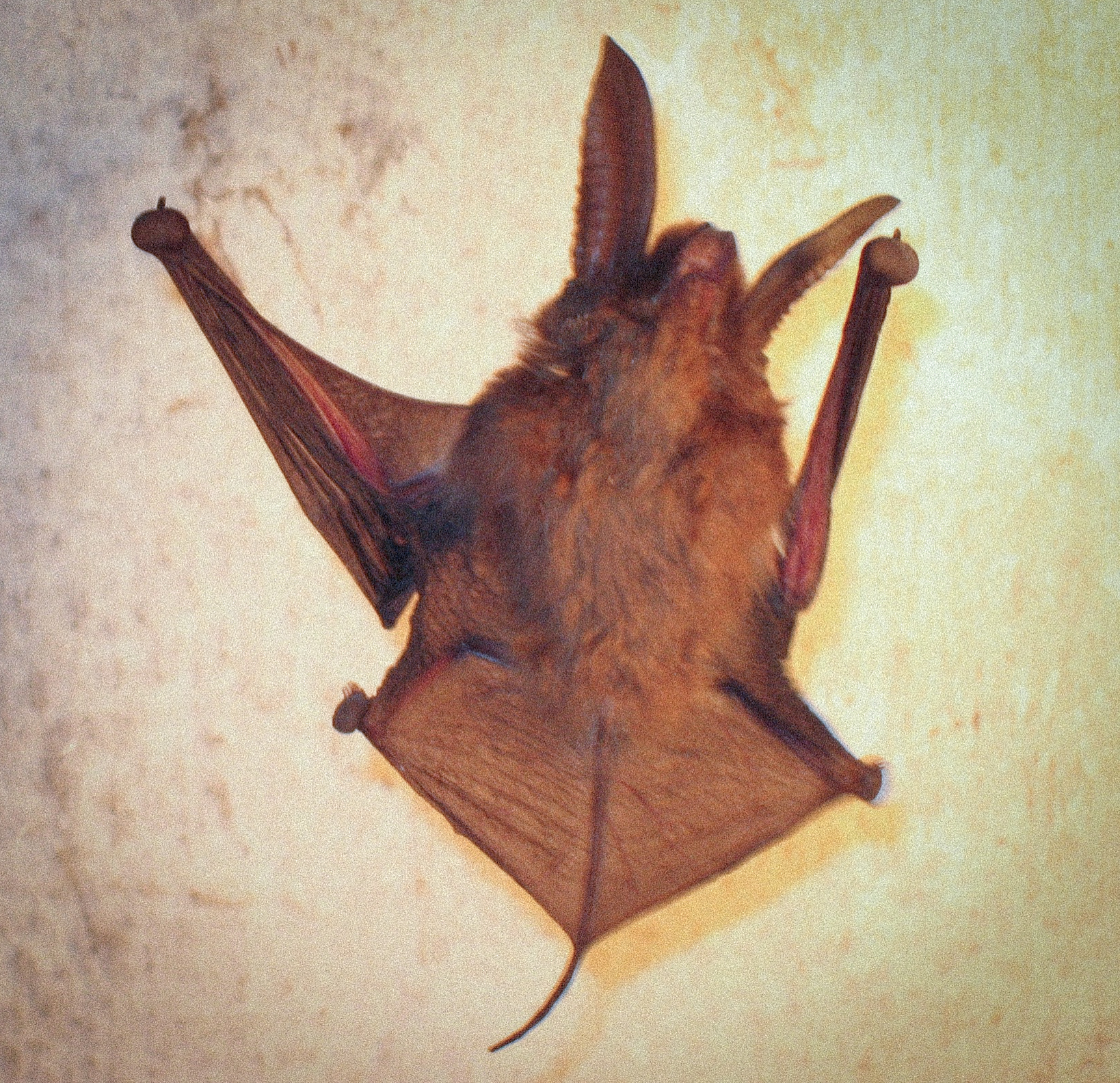

Conservation status
- Least Concern (IUCN 3.1)

Scientific classification
- Kingdom: Animalia
- Phylum: Chordata
- Class: Mammalia
- Order: Chiroptera
- Family: Myzopodidae
- Genus: Myzopoda
- Species: M. aurita

Binomial name
- Myzopoda aurita Milne-Edwards & A. Grandidier, 1878
- Madagascar sucker-footed bat range

= Madagascar sucker-footed bat =

Madagascar sucker-footed bat Temporal range: Pleistocene to Recent

Species of bat

The Madagascar sucker-footed bat, Old World sucker-footed bat, or simply sucker-footed bat (Myzopoda aurita) is a species of bat in the family Myzopodidae endemic to Madagascar, especially in the eastern part of the forests. The genus was thought to be monospecific until a second species, Myzopoda schliemanni, was discovered in the central western lowlands. It was classified as Vulnerable in the 1996 IUCN Red List of Threatened Species but is now known to be more abundant and was reclassified in 2008 as of "Least Concern".

The bat is named for the presence of small cups on its wrists and ankles. They roost inside the rolled leaves of the traveller's tree, using their suckers to attach themselves to the smooth surface. Despite the name, it is now known that the bats do not use suction to attach themselves to roost sites, but instead use a form of wet adhesion by secreting a body fluid at their pads. The ankle and wrist pads of the bat are controlled by muscle contraction and allow the bat to separate the pads to reduce the adhesive effect. This allows the bats to climb with ease and to remove themselves from surfaces after sticking. Due to this property the Madagascar sucker-footed bat is one of the few bat species that roosts with its head up rather than upside down. This is so the bat does not accidentally lose control of the adhesive pads while it is sleeping due to the muscle tension associated with roosting upside down.

Because of their unique habitat, sucker-footed bats don't carry ectoparasites, due to the smooth surface of the Ravenala leaves being inhospitable to small arthropods The majority of sucker-footed bats caught in eastern Madagascar were within or close to stands of traveller's trees, and according to research, the maximum distance they will travel while foraging is about 1.8 km (1.1 mi). Sucker-footed bats feed largely on beetles and small moths.
