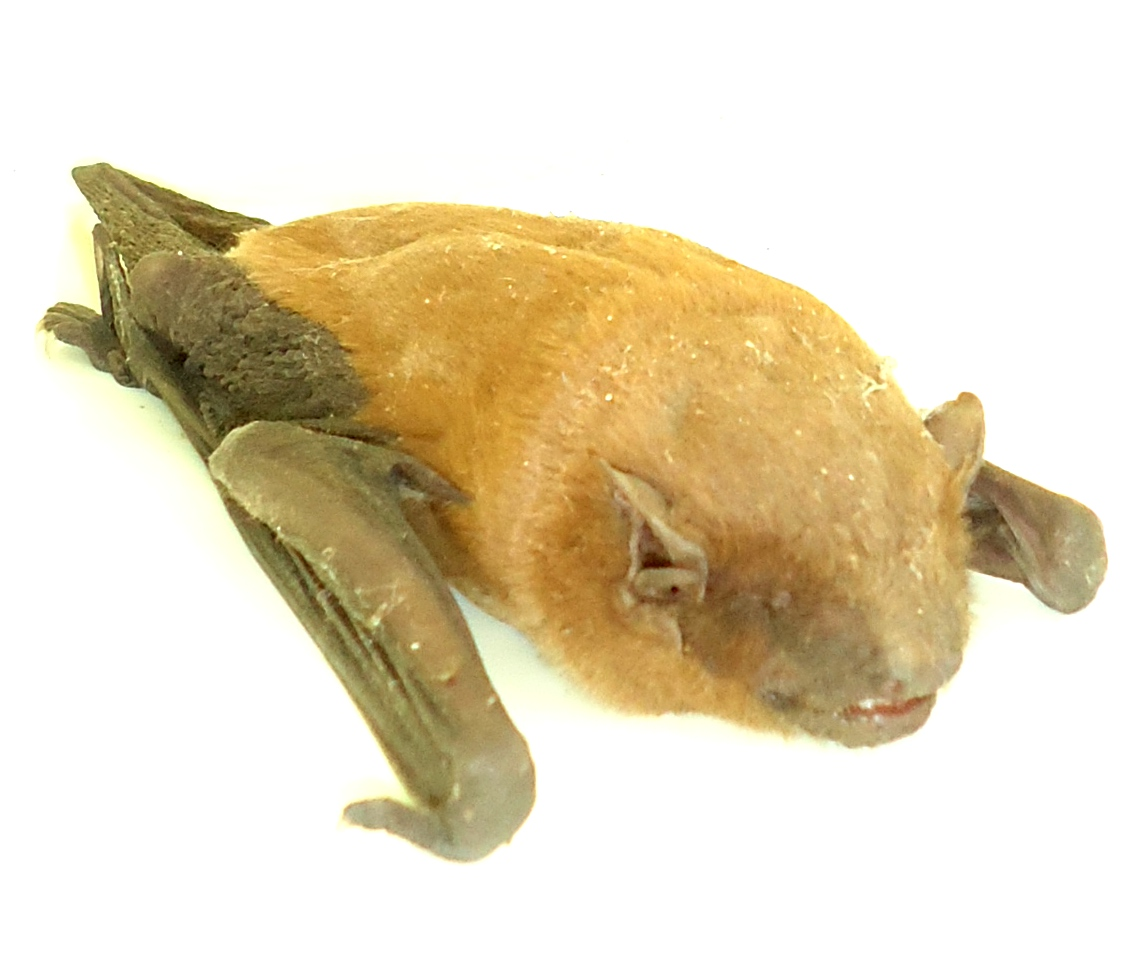
- Lesser Asiatic yellow bat (Scotophilus kuhlii)

Scientific classification
- Domain: Eukaryota
- Kingdom: Animalia
- Phylum: Chordata
- Class: Mammalia
- Order: Chiroptera
- Suborder: Yangochiroptera
- Superfamily: Vespertilionoidea; Gray, 1821

= Vespertilionoidea =

Vespertilionoidea Temporal range: Middle Eocene–present

Superfamily of bats

Vespertilionoidea is a superfamily of bats containing five families: Cistugidae, Miniopteridae, Molossidae, Natalidae, and Vespertilionidae. It is one of three superfamilies in the suborder Yangochiroptera, the others being Noctilionoidea and Emballonuroidea.

The earliest known member of the group is Stehlinia from the Middle Eocene, although its taxonomic affiliation has been previously disputed.
