= Emballonuroidea =

Scientific classification
- Kingdom: Animalia
- Phylum: Chordata
- Class: Mammalia
- Order: Chiroptera
- Suborder: Yangochiroptera
- Superfamily: Emballonuroidea; Weber, 1928

Families
- Emballonuridae; Myzopodidae; Nycteridae

Superfamily of bats

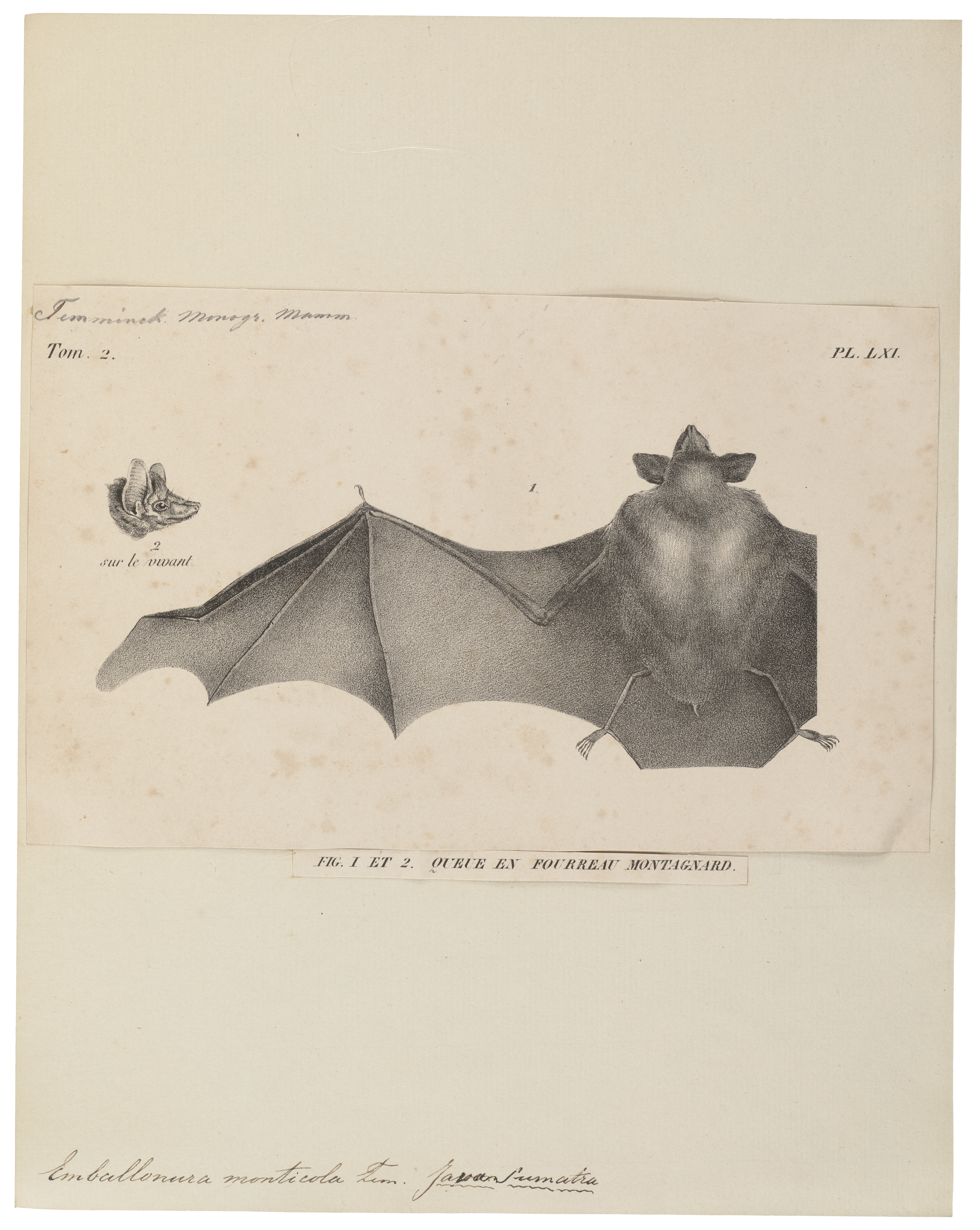

Emballonuroidea is a superfamily of bats containing three families: Emballonuridae, Myzopodidae and Nycteridae. It is one of three superfamilies in the suborder Yangochiroptera, the others being Noctilionoidea and Vespertilionoidea. Emballonurids are also known as sheath-tailed bats and sac-winged bats: the latter name refers to the glandular sac found on the edge of the wings in many species, used to produce a scent which represents territorial dominance and social presence. The Emballonuridae family contains 13 genera and 47 species, present in subtropical and tropical areas of the world. They take shelter in caves, trees, and hollow logs.
