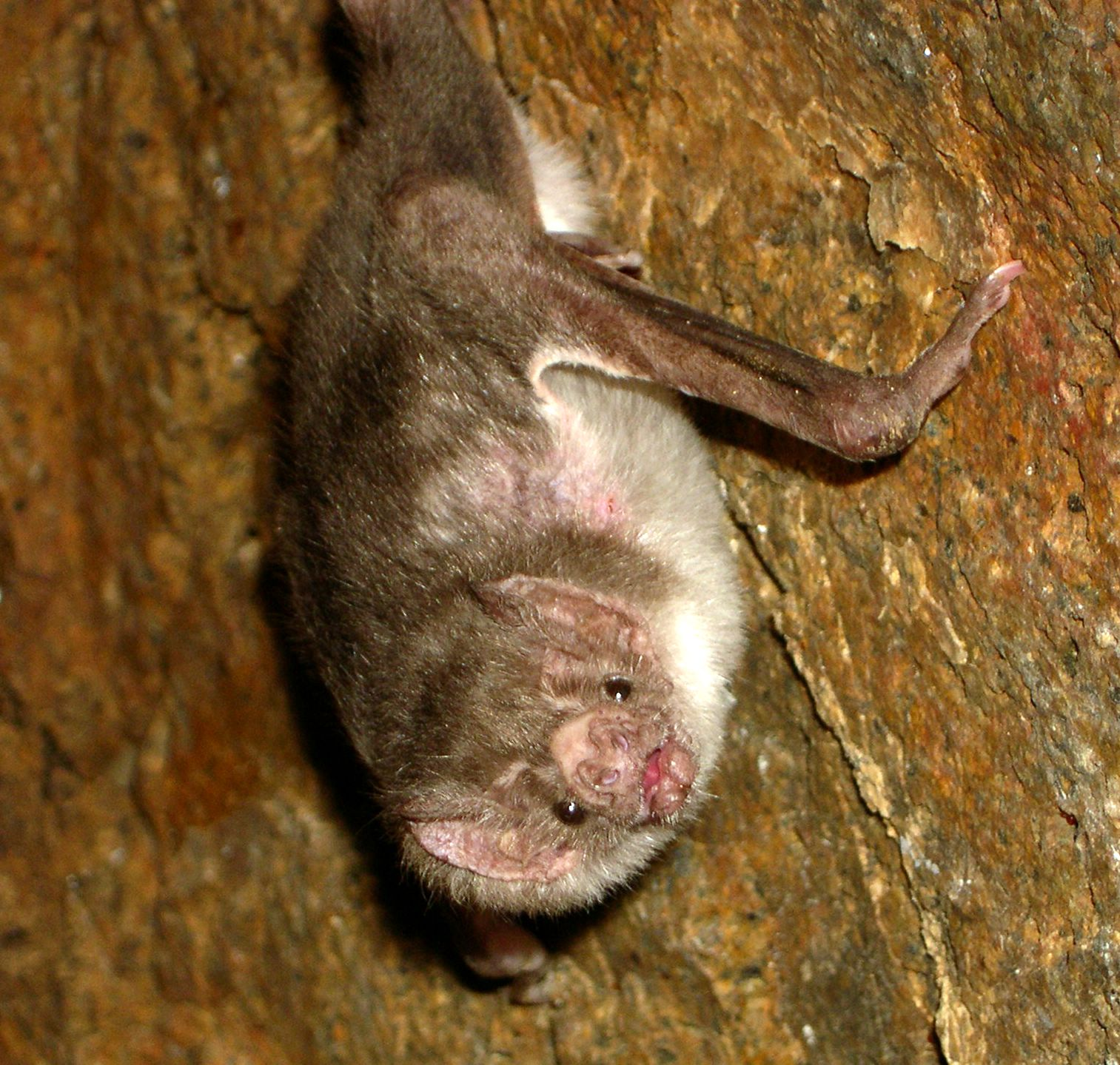

Scientific classification
- Kingdom: Animalia
- Phylum: Chordata
- Class: Mammalia
- Infraclass: Placentalia
- Order: Chiroptera
- Suborder: Yangochiroptera
- Superfamily: Noctilionoidea; Gray, 1821

= Noctilionoidea =

Superfamily of bats

Noctilionoidea is a superfamily of bats containing six families: Thyropteridae, Furipteridae, Noctilionidae, Mormoopidae, Phyllostomidae, and Mystacinidae.

It is one of three superfamilies in the suborder Yangochiroptera, the others being Vespertilionoidea and Emballonuroidea. The inclusion of Myzopodidae has been questioned, as other studies have placed it outside the superfamily as a sister group to Vespertilionoidea, sister group to Emballonuroidea, or within Emballonuroidea as part of Nycteridae.
