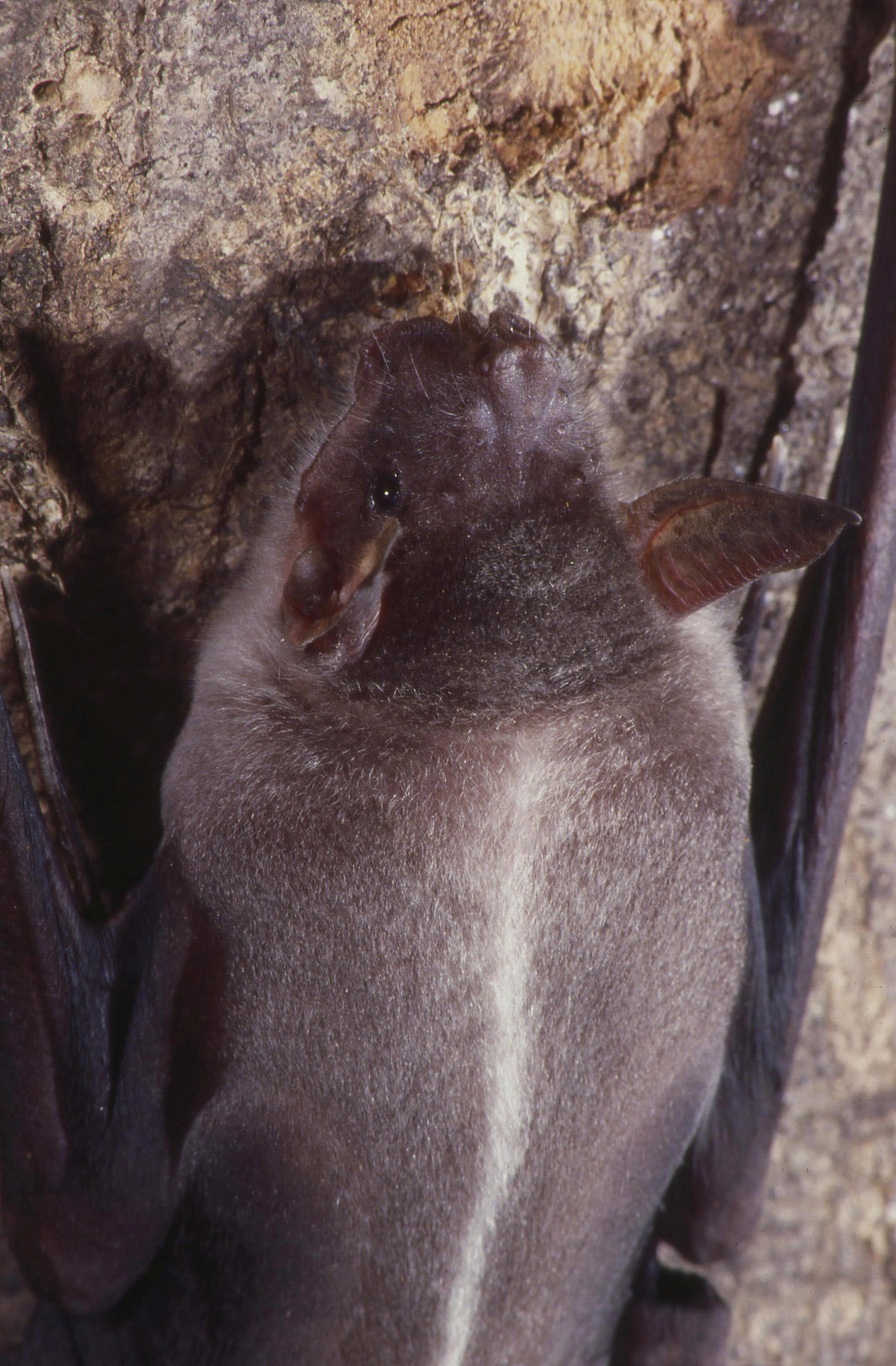
- Greater bulldog bat (Noctilio leporinus)

Scientific classification
- Kingdom: Animalia
- Phylum: Chordata
- Class: Mammalia
- Order: Chiroptera
- Suborder: Yangochiroptera
- Superfamily: Noctilionoidea
- Family: Noctilionidae; Gray, 1821
- Genus: Noctilio; Linnaeus, 1766

Type species
- Noctilio americanus

Species
- N. leporinus N. albiventris †N. lacrimaelunaris
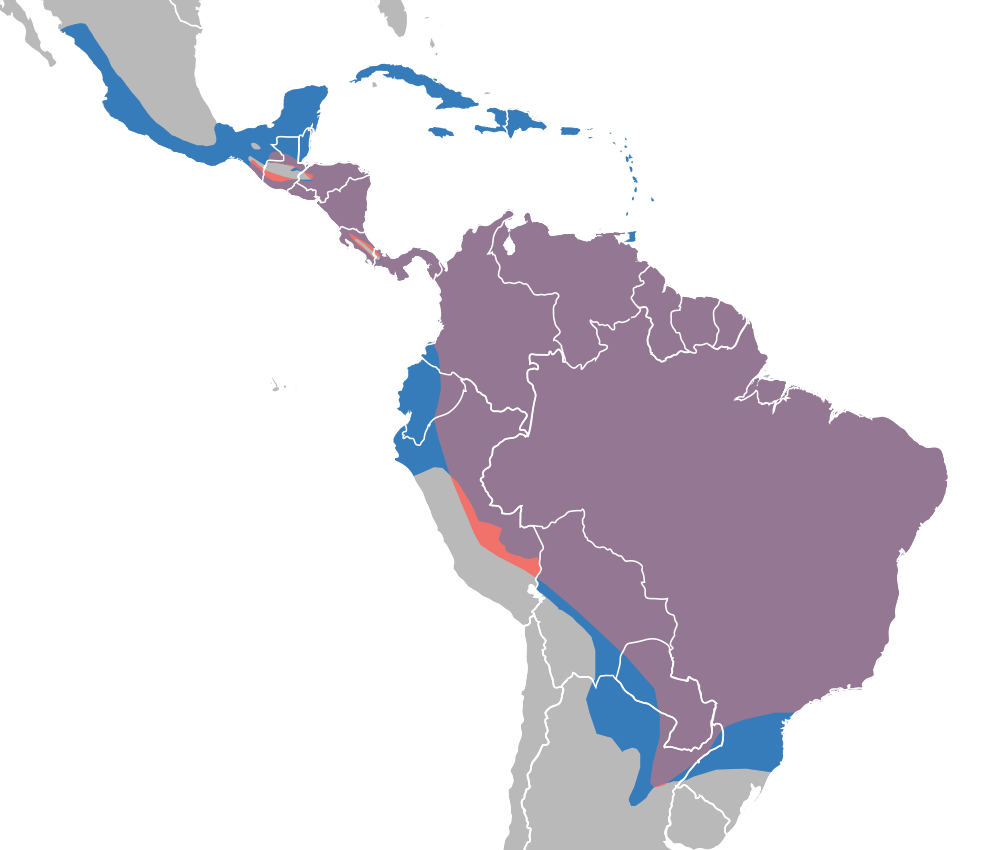
- Noctilio distribution N. albiventris in red, N. leporinus in blue, overlap in purple

= Bulldog bat =

Bulldog bats Temporal range: Miocene to Recent

Family of bats

The bat family Noctilionidae, commonly known as bulldog bats or fishing bats, is represented by two extant species, the greater and the lesser bulldog bats, as well as at least one fossil species, Noctilio lacrimaelunaris, from the Miocene of Argentina. The naked bulldog bat (Cheiromeles torquatus) does not belong to this family, but to the family Molossidae, the free-tailed bats. They are found near water in the Neotropics, from Mexico to Argentina and also in the Caribbean islands. In these areas they can be found roosting in groups within hollow trees, caves, manmade homes, or other openings with enough space. While the two species exhibit different social and foraging behaviors both tend to return to a main roosting spot while also visiting other alternative roosting spots.

== Description ==
The bulldog bats have orange to brown fur, and range in head-body length from 7 to 14 cm and weight of 20-75 g, which makes them quite large. They have relatively long legs, large feet (exceptionally so in the case of the greater bulldog bat), and strong claws. Their wings are long (up to 60 cm in spread) and narrow, and their ears are large, funnel shaped and pointed. Unusual among bats, they have cheek-pouches for storing food. They also have full lips divided by a fold of skin giving a 'hare lip' look which together with the cheek pouches gives them their bulldog-like appearance.

Their maxillae and premaxillae are fused for the strong support of the large upper medial incisors. Dental formula: 2/1, 1/1, 1/2, 3/3 = 28. The molars are tuberculosectorial. Unlike in other bats, the last cervical vertebra is not fused with the first thoracic. The wing second finger has a long metacarpal and a vestigial phalanx. The ischia are fused to each other and to the sacrum. The latter is keel-like.

== Ecology and behaviour ==
The species of lesser bulldog bats are insectivorous, and while the greater bulldog bats also eat insects, their chief food is fish (piscivorous). They use their echolocation to pinpoint the ripples they make on the surfaces of water. The greater bulldog bat trawls the water with its long, curved talons approximately 2–3 cm below the surface. It makes sweeps of between 30 cm and 3 m before ascending and turning to make a return sweep. In a single night, the bat may catch 20-30 small fish in this way.

Shortly after bulldog bats are born, they react behaviorally to sound (pinna reflex) and emit short ultrasounds. With their genetically big feet, they cling to their mothers. They don't begin to fly until 5-6 weeks postnatally and continue to nurse for up to 3 months.
