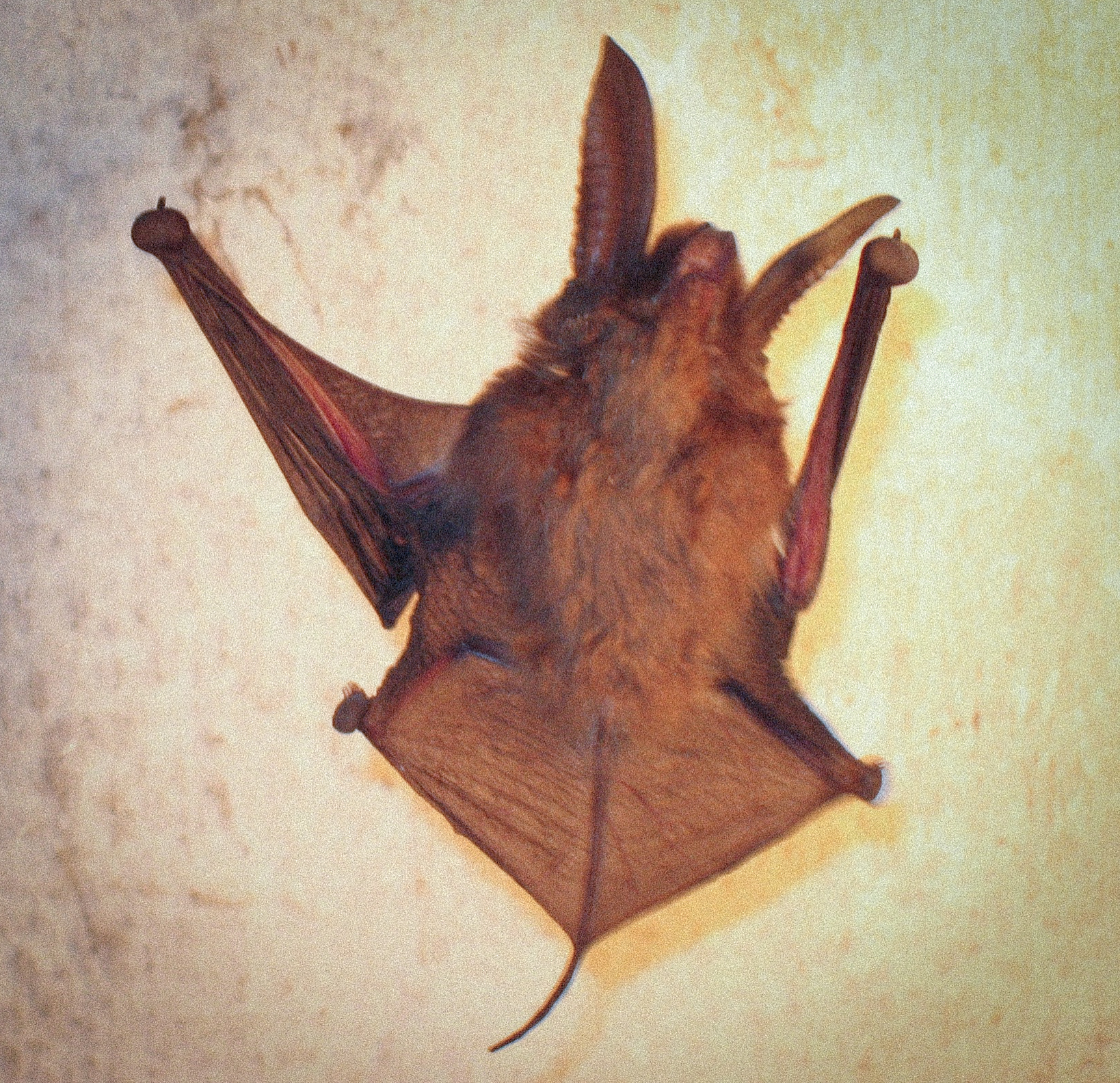
- Myzopoda aurita

Scientific classification
- Kingdom: Animalia
- Phylum: Chordata
- Class: Mammalia
- Infraclass: Placentalia
- Order: Chiroptera
- Superfamily: Emballonuroidea
- Family: Myzopodidae; Thomas, 1904
- Genus: Myzopoda; Milne-Edwards & A. Grandidier, 1878

Type species
- Myzopoda aurita Milne-Edwards and Grandidier, 1878
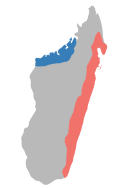
- Myzopoda distribution M. schliemanni in blue, M. aurita in red

= Myzopoda =

Myzopoda Temporal range: Late Eocene to present

Genus of bats

Myzopoda is a genus of bat, the only member of the monotypic family Myzopodidae, with two described species. Myzopodidae is unique as the only family of bats currently endemic to Madagascar. However, fossil discoveries indicate that the family has an ancient lineage in Africa, extending from the Pleistocene as far back as the late Eocene.

Based on nuclear DNA sequence data, Myzopodidae appears to be basal in the Gondwanan superfamily Noctilionoidea, most of whose members are neotropical. The origin and initial diversification of Noctilionoidea may have occurred in Africa prior to their dispersal to Australia and South America, probably via Antarctica. On the basis of fossil and molecular clock evidence, myzopodids are estimated to have split off from the rest of Noctilionoidea about 50 (46 to 57) million years ago.

== Species ==
- Genus Myzopoda
  - Madagascar sucker-footed bat, Myzopoda aurita Milne-Edwards & Grandidier, 1878
  - Western sucker-footed bat, Myzopoda schliemanni Goodman, Rakotondraparany & Kofoky, 2006

One fossil genus is known in Phasmatonycteris Gunnel, Simmons & Seiffert, 2014 from the Late Eocene and Early Oligocene of Egypt.

== See also ==
- List of bats of Madagascar
