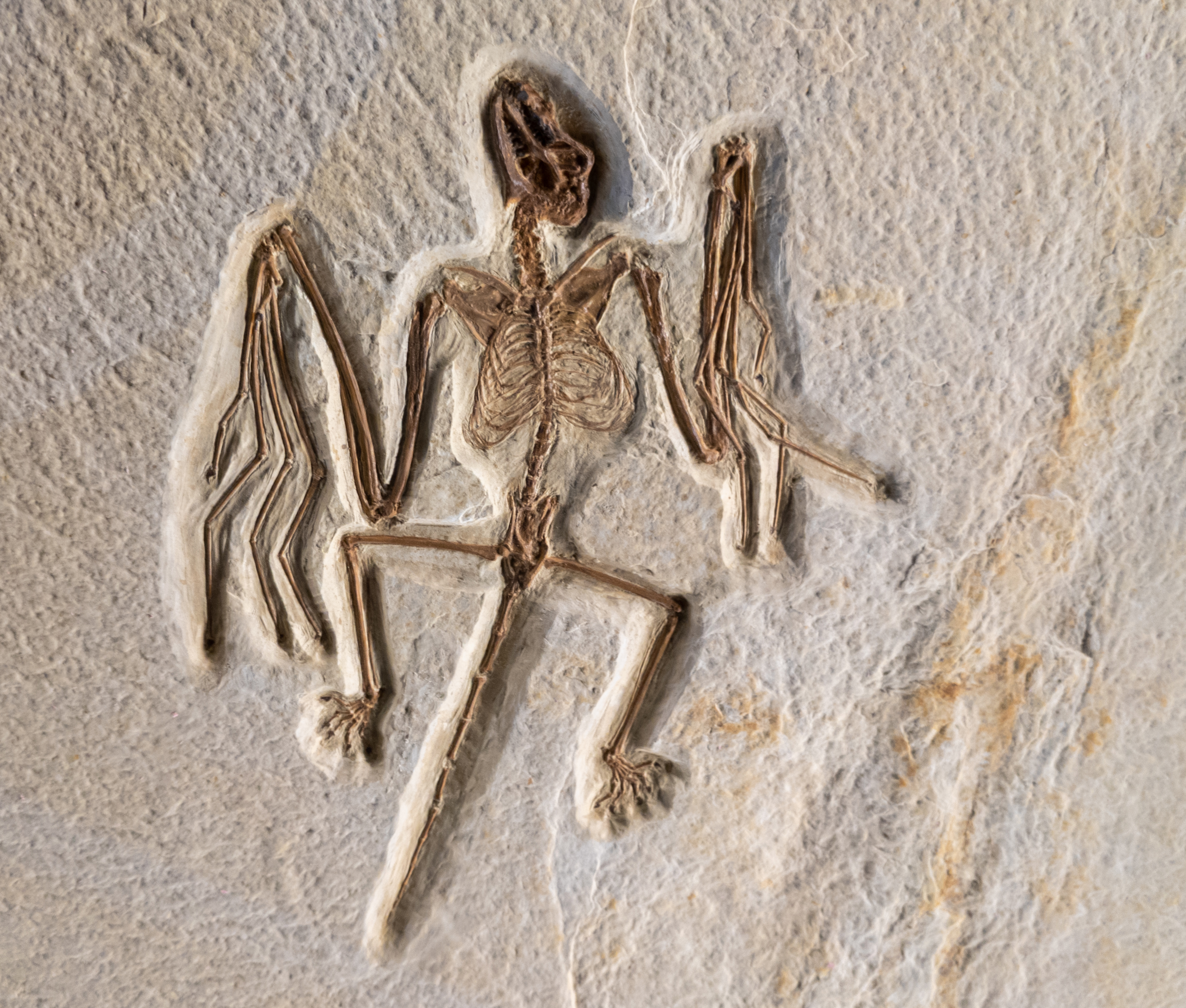
- Onychonycteris finneyi fossil

Scientific classification
- Kingdom: Animalia
- Phylum: Chordata
- Class: Mammalia
- Order: Chiroptera
- Family: †Onychonycteridae; Simmons, et al, 2008

Genera
- See text

Synonyms
- †Eppsinycterididae Hooker, 2010

= Onychonycteridae =

Onychonycteridae Temporal range: Early Eocene

Extinct family of bats

Onychonycteridae is an extinct family of bats known only from the early Eocene of Europe and North America. The type species, Onychonycteris finneyi, was described in 2008 from two nearly complete skeletons found in the Green River Formation of southwestern Wyoming. Since that time a number of previously described fossil bat species have been assigned to Onychonycteridae, as well as two more recently discovered species.

Most species belonging to Onychonycteridae are known only from isolated teeth and jaw fragments, however, they can be recognized by their relatively square-shaped upper molars, simple lower fourth premolar, and primitive, necromantodont lower molars. Onychonycteris finneyi exhibits additional primitive features of its skeleton, including claws on all five fingers and a simple cochlea that suggests it was incapable of echolocation. The dimensions of its wings suggest it employed a more primitive method of flight than living bats.

The monophyly of Onychonycteridae has been largely supported in several recent phylogenetic analyses. Hand et al. recovered a clade of onychonycterids with Onychonycteris diverging basally, followed by Eppsinycteris, Aegina, and finally the sister species Honrovits tsuwape and Honrovits (Hassianycteris) joeli. Jones et al. found Onychonycteridae to be split into two subclades, one consisting of Honrovits, Aegina, and Onychonycteris, and the other consisting of Eppsinycteris, Marnenycteris, and the enigmatic Archaeonycteris? praecursor. Volactrix was included in the latter analysis, but was not recovered among Onychonycteridae.

== Genera ==
The following genera are assigned to Onychonycteridae:

- †Ageina Russell et al., 1973
  - †Ageina tobieni Russell et al., 1973 - Mutigny (MP 8-9), France
- †Eppsinycteris Hooker, 1996
  - †Eppsinycteris anglica Hooker, 1996 - Abbey Wood (MP 8–9), England
- †Honrovits Beard et al., 1992
  - †Honrovits tsuwape Beard et al., 1992 - Wind River Formation (late Wasatchian), Wyoming
- †Marnenycteris Hand et al., 2015
  - †Marnenycteris michauxi Hand et al., 2015 - Pourcy (Ypresian), France
- †Onychonycteris Simmons et al., 2008
  - †Onychonycteris finneyi Simmons et al., 2008 - Green River Formation (late Wasatchian), Wyoming
- †Volactrix? Czaplewski et al., 2022
  - †Volactrix simmonsae? Czaplewski et al., 2022 - Sheep Pass Formation (Bridgerian), Nevada

The following species may belong to Onychonycteridae according to Smith et al., 2012:

- "Hassianycteris" joeli Smith and Russell, 1992 - Evere (Ypresian), Belgium
