= Marnenycteris =

Marnenycteris Temporal range: Ypresian

Scientific classification
- Kingdom: Animalia
- Phylum: Chordata
- Class: Mammalia
- Order: Chiroptera
- Family: †Onychonycteridae
- Genus: †Marnenycteris
- Species: †M. michauxi

Binomial name
- †Marnenycteris michauxi Hand et al., 2015

Extinct genus of bats

Marneycteris is an extinct genus of onychonycterid that inhabited France during the Eocene epoch. It contains a single species, M. michauxi.
