= Bat flight =

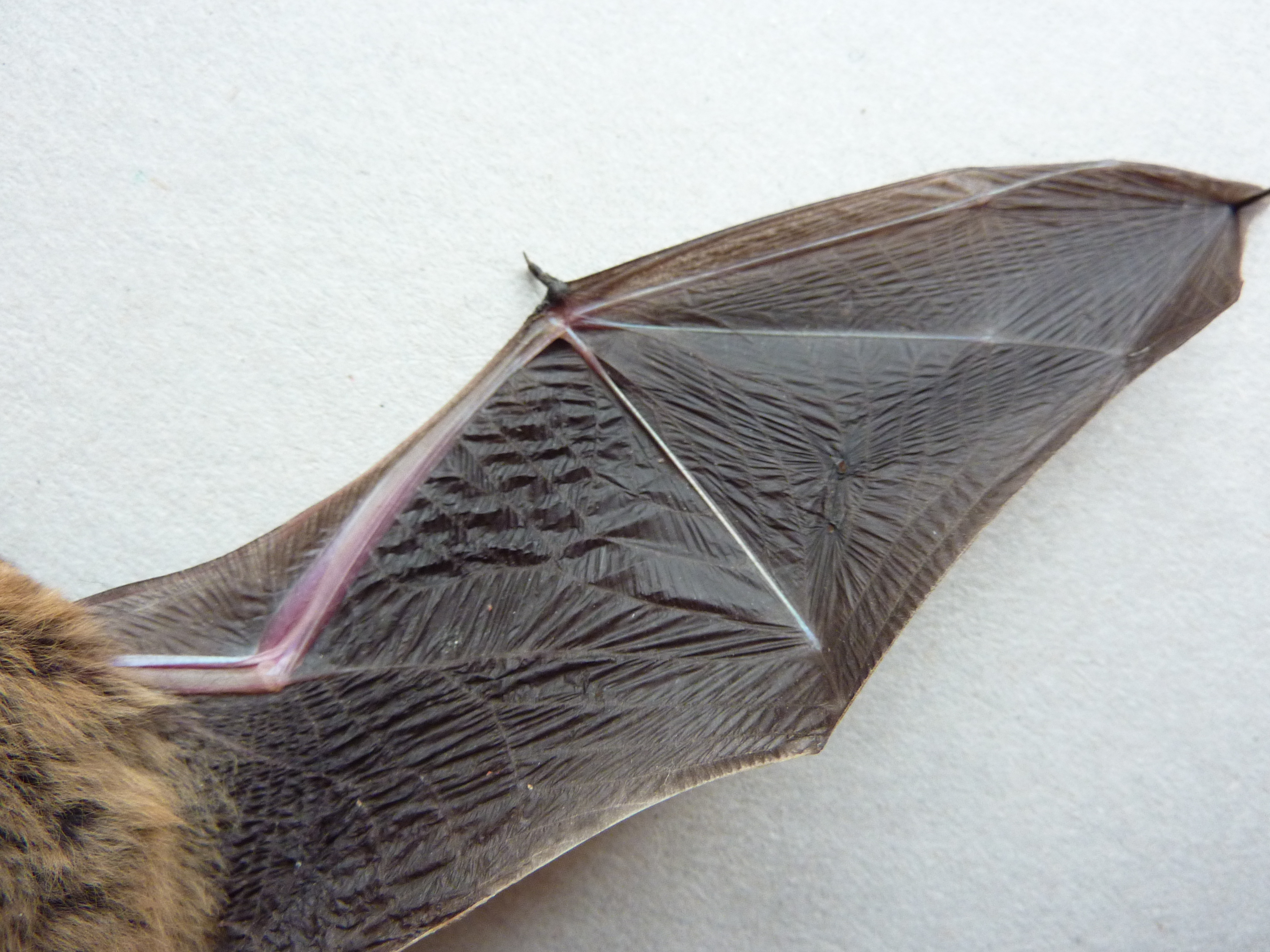
A bat wing, which is a highly modified forelimb

Bats are the only mammal capable of true flight. Bats use flight for capturing prey, breeding, avoiding predators, and long-distance migration. Bat wing morphology is often highly specialized to the needs of the species.

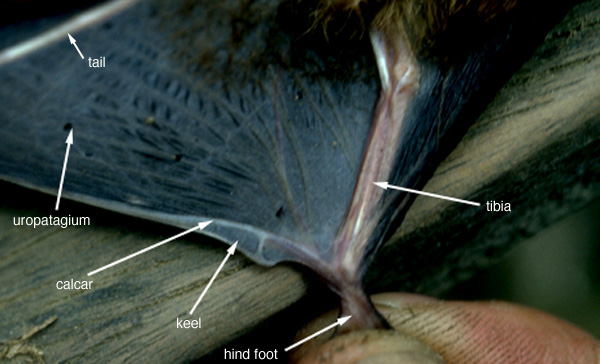
This image is displaying the anatomical makeup of a specific bat wing. Specifically demonstrating the tibia, uropatagium, keel, calcar, tail, and hind foot (being held in between the fingers).

== Evolution ==
Charles Darwin foresaw an issue with his theory of evolution by natural selection in the evolution of complex traits such as eyes or "the structure and habits of a bat." Indeed, the oldest bat fossils are very similar in wing morphology to the bats of today, despite existing 52.5 million years ago. Onychonycteris finneyi, the earliest known bat, already possessed powered flight. O. finneyi likely had an undulating flight style that alternated periods of fluttering with gliding. Evidence for this lies in the broad and short nature of O. finneyi wing morphology, which would have made it difficult to efficiently maneuver in the air or sustain flight. Additionally claws were seen on the ends of their forelimb digits (which have since disappeared in modern-day bats) giving evidence that O. finneyi was a skilled climber. The common ancestor of all bats is hypothesized to have been an arboreal quadruped of the Northern Hemisphere. This ancestor is predicted to have lived 64 million years ago at the border of the Cretaceous and Paleogene, based on molecular and paleontological data. There is a gap in the fossil record, and no transitional fossils exist from this quadrupedal ancestor to the appearance of the modern bat. It is unclear how long the transition from quadrupedalism to powered flight took. Based on a phylogenetic analysis of wing aerodynamics, the ancestral Chiropteran had wings with a low aspect ratio and rounded wingtips; this indicates it had slow but maneuverable and agile flight. After evolving powered flight, bats underwent massive adaptive radiation, becoming the second-most speciose mammal order, after rodents.

A 2011 study hypothesized that, rather than having evolved from gliders, the ancestors of bats were flatterers, although the researchers did not find any actual evidence for this theory. A 2020 study proposed that flight in bats might have originated independently at least three times, in the groups Yangochiroptera, Pteropodidae and Rhinolophoidea. A response paper rejected this hypothesis based on paleontological and developmental data. Stem-bats such as Onychonycteris and Icaronycteris were already capable of flying and the latter was a laryngeal echolocator. Contrary to the hypothesis of multiple flight origins, which assumes a bat ancestor with only hindwings and no plagiopatagia, embryonic development shows the plagiopatagium appearing before the dactyloptagium. A model was used to test the viability of a handwings-only glider and found it ineffective as an actual gliding animal.

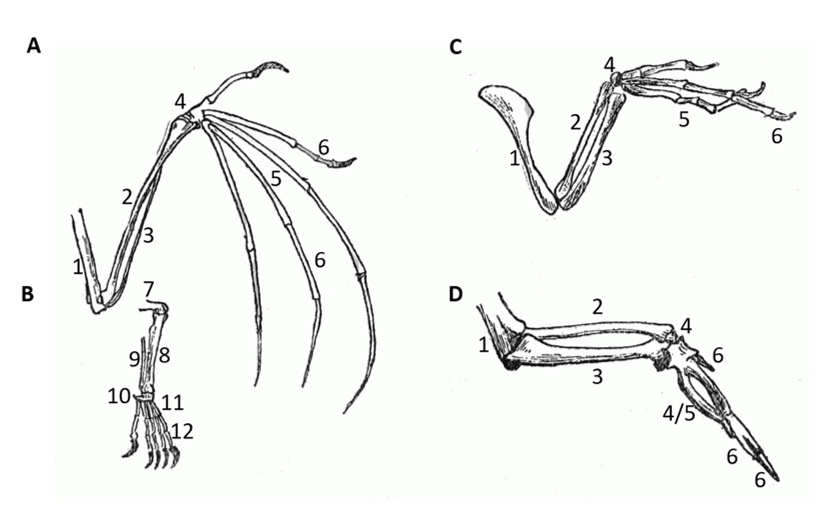
A) Bat wing B) Bat hind foot C) Fore foot or wings of Archaeopteryx D) Fore foot or wing bones of domestic fowl. 1= Humerus, 2= Radius, 3= Ulna, 4= Carpals, 4/5= Carpometacarpus, 5= Metacarpals, 6= Phalanges, 7= Femur, 8= Tibia, 9= Fibula, 10= Tarsals, 11= Metatarsals, 12= Phalanges

The expansion of the long bones in bat wings is at least partly attributed to paired-box (Pax) homeodomain transcription factor, PRX1. It is believed that changes in the PRX1 enhancer along with other molecular factors lead to the morphological separation of bats from their ancestors. Up-regulation of the bone morphogenetic protein (BMP) signaling pathway is also crucial in developmental and evolutionary elongation of bat forelimb digits.FGF10 signaling is also likely required for the development of bat wing membrane and muscles.

To make powered flight possible, bats had to evolve several features. Bat flight necessitated the increase of membrane surface area between the digits of the forelimbs, between the forelimbs and hindlimbs, and between the hindlimbs. Bats also had to evolve a thinner cortical bone to reduce torsional stresses produced by propulsive downstroke movements. Bats had to reroute innervation to their wing muscles to allow for control of powered flight. The strength and mass of forelimb musculature also had to be increased to allow powerful upstrokes and downstrokes. To provide sufficient oxygen supply to its body, bats also had to make several metabolic adaptations to provide for the increased energy cost of flight including high metabolic rate, increased lung capacity, and aerobic respiration.

Bats are the only mammals specialized for flight for a few reasons. They have specialized forelimbs, membranes, large pectoral muscles and large back muscles used for powering their wingbeats in flight. Both of these muscle groups are similar in appearance among vertebrates. However, bats have a unique muscle group known as the occipito-pollicalis, a necessary muscle group for mammalian flight. These muscle groups act to power flight and utilize the plagiopatagium which is the skin overlapping the forelimb, similar to the skin on species of flying squirrels. The skin located on the bat wing is called the patagium. It is composed of elastin fibers along with connective tissue, and provides durability and flexibility for the bat to lift itself easily.

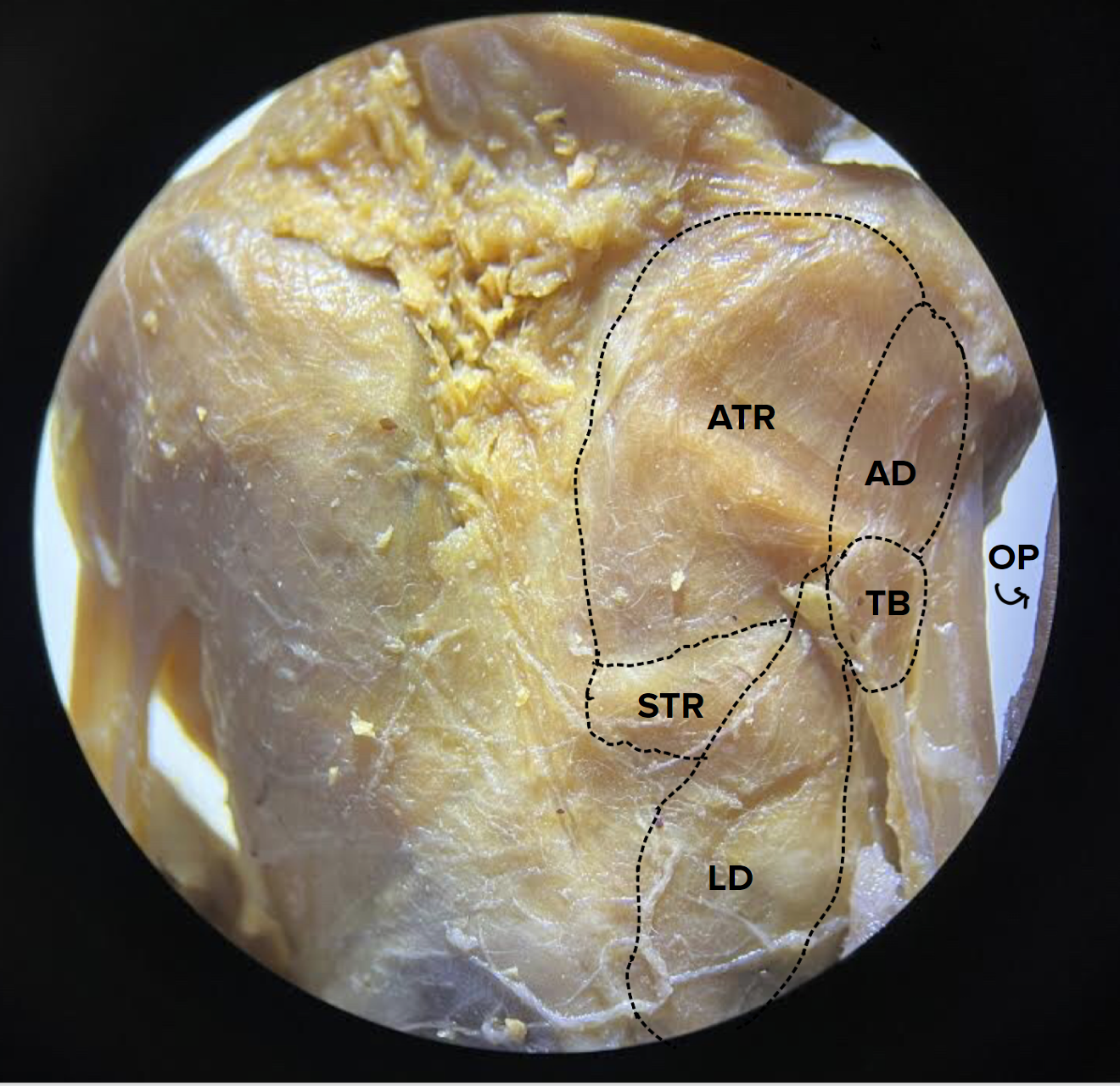
The labeled muscle groups of a bat. Abbreviations are as follows; ATR: acromiotrapezius, AD: acromiodeltoideus, TB: Triceps brachii, OP: occipito-pollicalis, LD: latissimus dorsi. Follow

== Wing shape ==
=== Wing chord ===
The chord length of a bat wing is the distance from the leading edge to the trailing edge measured parallel to the direction of flight. The mean chord length $\bar{c}$ is a standardized measure which captures a representative chord length over a whole flap cycle. Given wing area S, and wingspan b, the mean chord can be calculated by,

$\bar{c} = \frac{S}{b}$

=== Aspect ratio ===
Aspect ratio has been calculated with different definitions. The two methods outlined here give different, non-comparable values. The first method of calculation uses the wingspan b, and the wing area S, and is given by,

$\text{AR} \equiv \frac{b^2}{S} = \frac{b}{\bar{c}}$

Using this definition, typical values of aspect ratio fall between 5 and 11 depending on the wing morphology of a given species. Faster flight speed is significantly correlated with higher aspect ratios. Higher aspect ratios decrease the energetic costs of flight, which is beneficial to migratory species.

Another way to calculate the wing aspect ratio is by taking the length of the wrist to the tip of the third finger, adding the length of the forearm, and then dividing that total by the distance from the wrist to the fifth finger.

=== Wing loading ===
Wing loading is the weight of the bat divided by the wing area and is expressed using the unit N/m^{2} (newtons per square metre). Given a bat of mass m, the wing loading Q is,

$Q=\frac{m g}{S}$

For bats, wing loading values typically range from 4 to 35 N/m^{2} depending on the bat species. Mass loading differs only by a constant g, and is expressed in kg/m^{2}.

In a meta analysis covering 257 species of bats, higher relative wing loading values were observed in bats which fly at higher velocities, while lower wing loading values were correlated with improved flight maneuverability. Additionally, bats with lower wing loading were seen to have better mass-carrying ability, and were able carry larger prey while flying.

=== Wingtips ===
Bats with larger wingtips have slower flight speeds. Wings with rounded tips have lower aspect ratios, and are associated with slower, more maneuverable flight.

== Wing morphology as it relates to ecology ==
=== Fast hawking ===
Bats that consume insects by hawking (aerial pursuit and capture) must be able to travel at fast speeds, and must employ a high level of maneuverability. Morphological adaptations that favor this style of flight include high wing loading, long and pointed wingtips, and wings with high aspect ratios. The bat family Molossidae is considered highly specialized at hawking, with unusually high aspect ratios and wing loading. These traits make them capable of incredibly fast speeds. Mexican free-tailed bats are thought to be the fastest mammal on earth, capable of horizontal flight speeds over a level surface up to 160 km/h (100 mph).

=== Gleaning ===
Bats that glean insects capture stationary prey on a solid substrate. This foraging method requires bats to hover above the substrate and listen for insect noises. Short, rounded wingtips in gleaning bats may be advantageous to allow maneuverability of flight in cluttered airspace. Pointed wingtips may be detrimental to a bat's ability to glean insects.

=== Trawling ===
Bats with this foraging style pluck insects off the surface of a body of water. Piscivores employ the same flight style to catch fish just below the water's surface. Trawling bats travel at slower speeds, which means that they require low wing loading.

=== Frugivory ===
Frugivores have below-average aspect ratios. Fruit-eating bats have variable wing-loading, which corresponds to vertical stratification of rain forests. Fruit-eating bats that travel below the canopy have higher wing-loading; bats that travel above the canopy have intermediate wing-loading; bats that travel in the understory have low wing-loading. This pattern of decreasing wing-loading as airspace becomes more cluttered is consistent with data that suggest that lower wing-loading is associated with greater maneuverability.

=== Nectarivory ===
Nectarivores, like gleaners, will frequently employ hovering during foraging. Hovering nectarivores are more likely to have rounded wingtips, which aids in maneuverability. Nectarivores that land on the flower before feeding have worse maneuverability. Nectarivores in general have lower aspect ratios, which makes them more suited to flight in a cluttered environment. Nectarivores that migrate to seasonal food resources, such as the genus Leptonycteris, have lower wing-loading than nectarivorous species with small home ranges.

=== Carnivory ===
Bats that consume non-insect animal prey are benefited by low wing-loading, which allows them to lift and carry larger prey items. This increased capacity for lift even allows them to take flight from the ground while carrying a prey item that is half of their body weight.

=== Sanguinivory ===
The three species of sanguinivorous bats belong to the subfamily Desmodontinae. These bats are characterized by relatively high wing-loading and short or average wingspans. The high wing-loading allows them faster flight speeds, which is advantageous when they have to commute long distances from their roosts to find prey. The common vampire bat has an average aspect ratio and very short, slightly rounded wingtips. The hairy-legged vampire bat has the lowest aspect ratio of the three species; it also has relatively long and rounded wingtips. Hairy-legged vampire bats are more adapted to maneuverable flights than the other two species. The white-winged vampire bat has the highest aspect ratio of the three species, which means it is most adapted to long flights.
