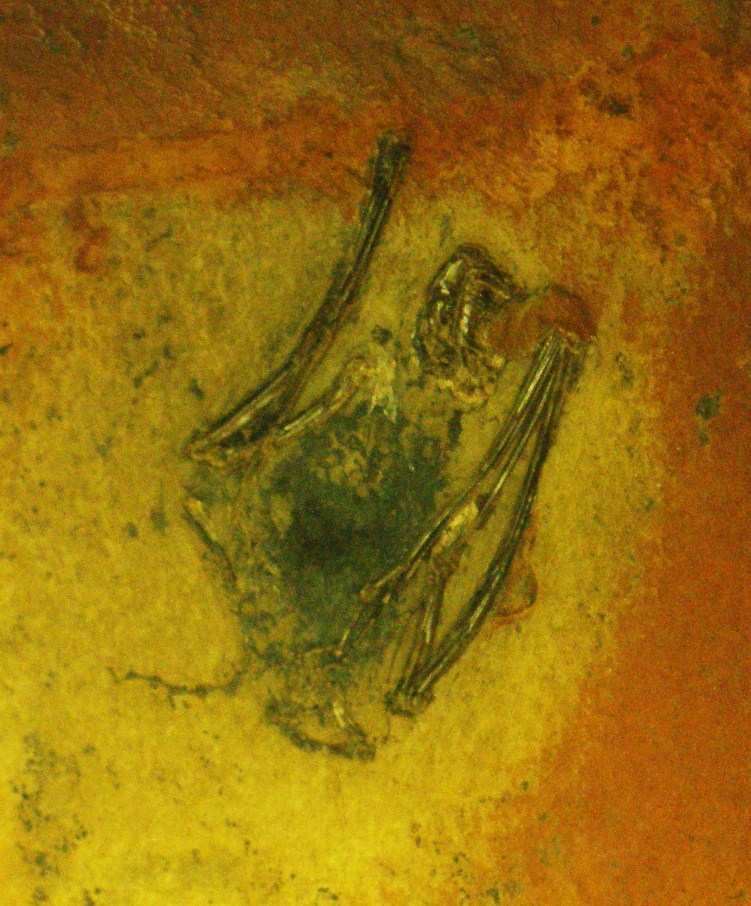
- Specimen of H. messelensis from the Messel Pit of Germany

Scientific classification
- Kingdom: Animalia
- Phylum: Chordata
- Class: Mammalia
- Infraclass: Placentalia
- Order: Chiroptera
- (unranked): Microchiropteramorpha
- Family: †Hassianycterididae
- Genus: †Hassianycteris; Smith & Storch, 1981

Species
- †Hassianycteris messelensis Smith & Storch, 1981; †Hassianycteris joeli? Smith & Russell, 1992; †Hassianycteris kumari Smith et al., 2007; †Hassianycteris magna Smith & Storch, 1981; †Hassianycteris revilliodi (Russell & Sigé, 1970)

= Hassianycteris =

Hassianycteris Temporal range: Early Eocene, 55.8–48.6 Ma

Extinct genus of bats

Hassianycteris is an extinct genus of Early Eocene (Ypresian) to Middle Eocene (Lutetian) bats from the Hassianycterididae with four or five known species: the type (H. messelensis), H. magna, and H. revilliodi, all found in the Messel pit, Germany, H. kumari, found in the Cambay Shale Formation (Vastan Lignite Mine), India, and the possible fifth species "H." joeli, found in the Kortijk Clay Formation, Belgium, which may instead belong to Onychonycteridae. The Messel bats Palaeochiropteryx and Hassianycteris (alive roughly 48 million years ago) are the first fossil mammals whose colouration has been discovered: both were reddish-brown when alive.
