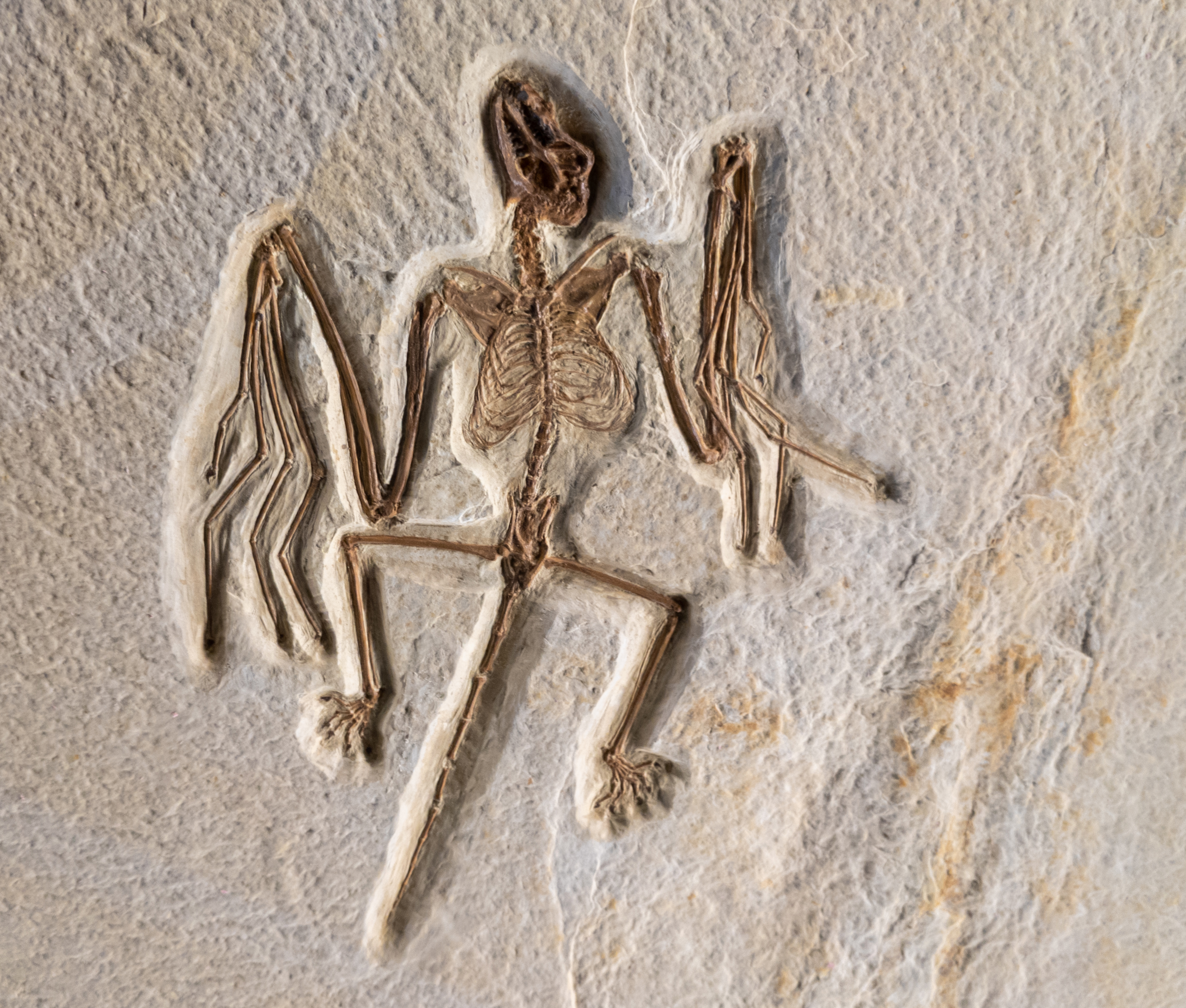
- Fossil

Scientific classification
- Kingdom: Animalia
- Phylum: Chordata
- Class: Mammalia
- Order: Chiroptera
- Family: †Onychonycteridae
- Genus: †Onychonycteris
- Species: †O. finneyi

Binomial name
- †Onychonycteris finneyi Simmons, Seymour, Habersetzer, and Gunnell 2008

= Onychonycteris =

Onychonycteris Temporal range: 52.5 Ma Early Eocene

Extinct genus of bats

Onychonycteris was the more primitive of the three oldest bats known from complete skeletons, having lived in the area that is current day Wyoming during the Eocene period, 52.5 million years ago.

== Taxonomy ==
Two specimens of Onychonycteris were found in the Green River Formation in 2003, and placed in a new family when the discovery was published in Nature, in February 2008. Onychonycteris means "clawed bat", in reference to the fact that this animal had claws on all five of its digits, whereas modern bats only have claws on the thumb (in most species) or thumb and index finger (in pteropodids). The specific epithet is a tribute to the fossil prospector and preparator who discovered it, Bonnie Finney.

== Description ==
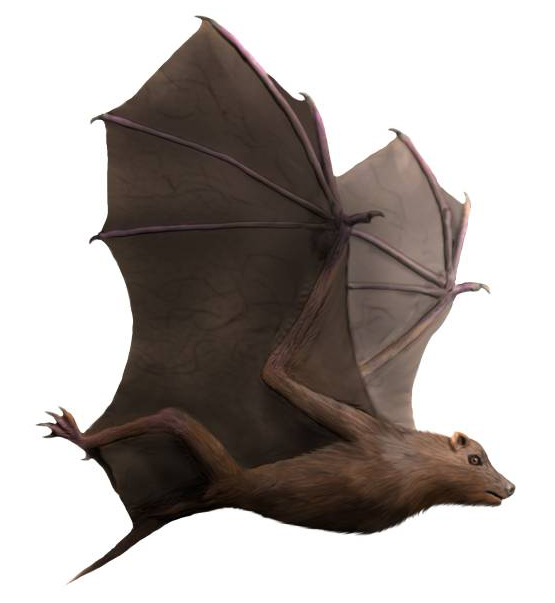
Restoration

Onychonycteris was unique among bats in that it had claws on all five fingers, as opposed to two or three in all other known species. Its unique limb proportions represent an intermediate between bats and non-flying mammals, with longer hind-limbs and proportionally shorter wings. The aerofoil of O. finneyi lacks an aerodynamic equivalent among known bats (although the modern species long-haired fruit bat and Leschenault's rousette comes close), and this aerofoil likely contributed to an undulating flight style that would require high speed and alternated fluttering and gliding. This flight style was interpreted as a functional and evolutionary intermediate between gliding and powered flight.

== Paleobiology ==
=== Flight vs. echolocation ===
Onychonycteris finneyi was the strongest evidence so far in the debate on whether bats developed echolocation before or after they evolved the ability to fly. O. finneyi was, based on biomechanical analysis of its fossils, capable of both gliding and powered flight in both the hyperdense atmosphere of the Early Eocene as modelled based on geochemical proxies and an atmosphere characteristic of the present-day. O. finneyi had well-developed wings, and could clearly fly, but lacked the enlarged cochlea of all extant echolocating bats, closely resembling the old world fruit bats which do not echolocate. This indicates that early bats could fly before they could echolocate.

However, an independent evaluation of the Onychonycteris reference fossil in 2010 provided some evidence for other bone structures indicative of laryngeal echolocation, raising the possibility that Onychonycteris finneyi possessed the ability to echolocate after all. They did acknowledge that the fossil itself has been flattened by the fossilization process (a 'pancake fossil'), and thus it was difficult to ascertain the exact bone structure and configuration, a fact that still casts a degree of uncertainty on the results of both studies.

It is unknown whether Onychonycteris had the large eyes of most nocturnal animals as specimens with intact eye sockets have yet to be found. A lack of enlarged eyes would indicate that this species may have been diurnal, solving the problem of how primitive bats evolved flight without the ability to navigate at night using echolocation.

Onychonycteris occurs alongside Icaronycteris index, previously thought to be the most primitive known bat species, and Icaronycteris gunnelli.
