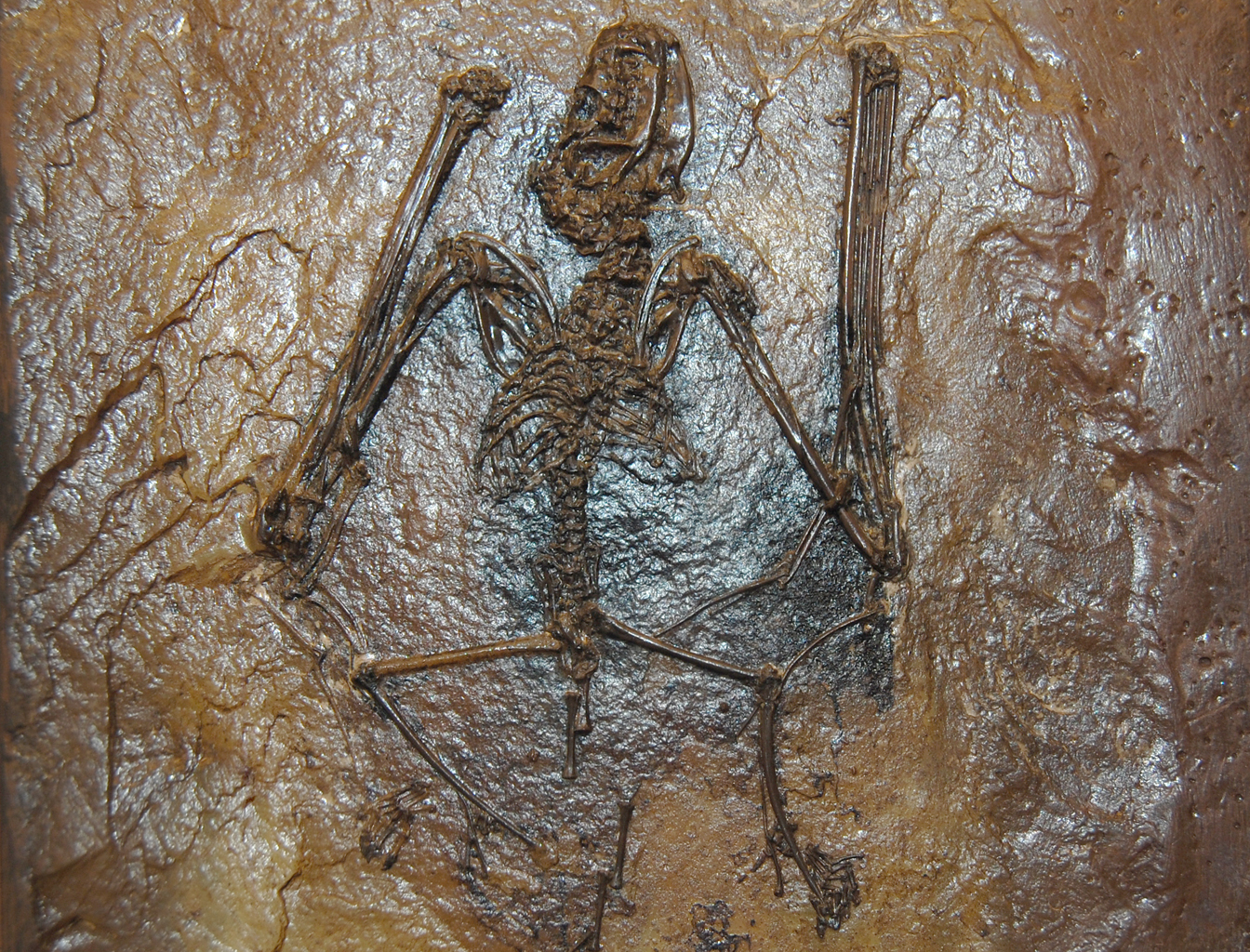
- Fossil in Vienna

Scientific classification
- Kingdom: Animalia
- Phylum: Chordata
- Class: Mammalia
- Order: Chiroptera
- (unranked): Microchiropteramorpha
- Family: †Palaeochiropterygidae
- Genus: †Palaeochiropteryx; Revilliod, 1917

Type species
- Palaeochiropteryx tupaiodon Revilliod, 1917

Species
- †Palaeochiropteryx tupaiodon Revilliod, 1917; †Palaeochiropteryx sambuceus Czaplewski et al., 2022; †Palaeochiropteryx spiegeli Revilliod, 1917
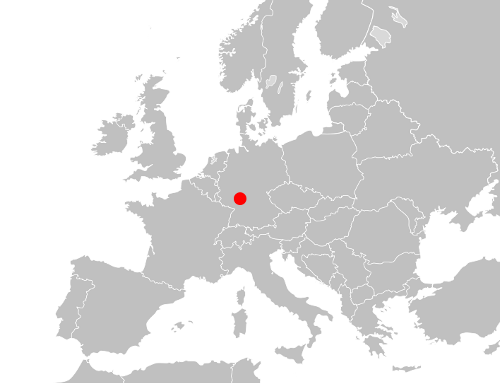
- Fossils of Palaeochiropteryx are only known from Messel Pit, Germany.

= Palaeochiropteryx =

Palaeochiropteryx Temporal range: Lutetian, 48.6–40.4 Ma

Extinct genus of bats

Palaeochiropteryx (/ˌpælioʊkaɪˈrɒptərɪks/ PAL-ee-oh-ky-ROP-tər-iks) is an extinct genus of bat from the Middle Eocene of Europe and North America. It contains three very similar species – Palaeochiropteryx tupaiodon and Palaeochiropteryx spiegeli, both from the famous Messel Pit of Germany, as well as Palaeochiropteryx sambuceus from the Sheep Pass Formation (Nevada, United States). They are usually found complete and exceptionally preserved, even retaining the outlines of their fur, ears, and wing membranes.

They are one of the oldest bats known, existing around 48 million years ago. Despite this, they were already quite advanced, showing evidence of the ability to hunt by echolocation like modern insect-eating bats.

Palaeochiropteryx were small bats, with a wingspan between 25 and 30 cm (9.8 and 11.8 in). Their wings were short but broad, indicating an adaptation for slow but highly maneuverable flight beneath forest canopies and among dense vegetation. They preyed mostly on moths and caddisflies and were probably nocturnal.

Along with the contemporary Hassianycteris, Palaeochiropteryx is among the first fossil mammals to have its coloration determined through analysis of melanosomes.

== Discovery and classification ==
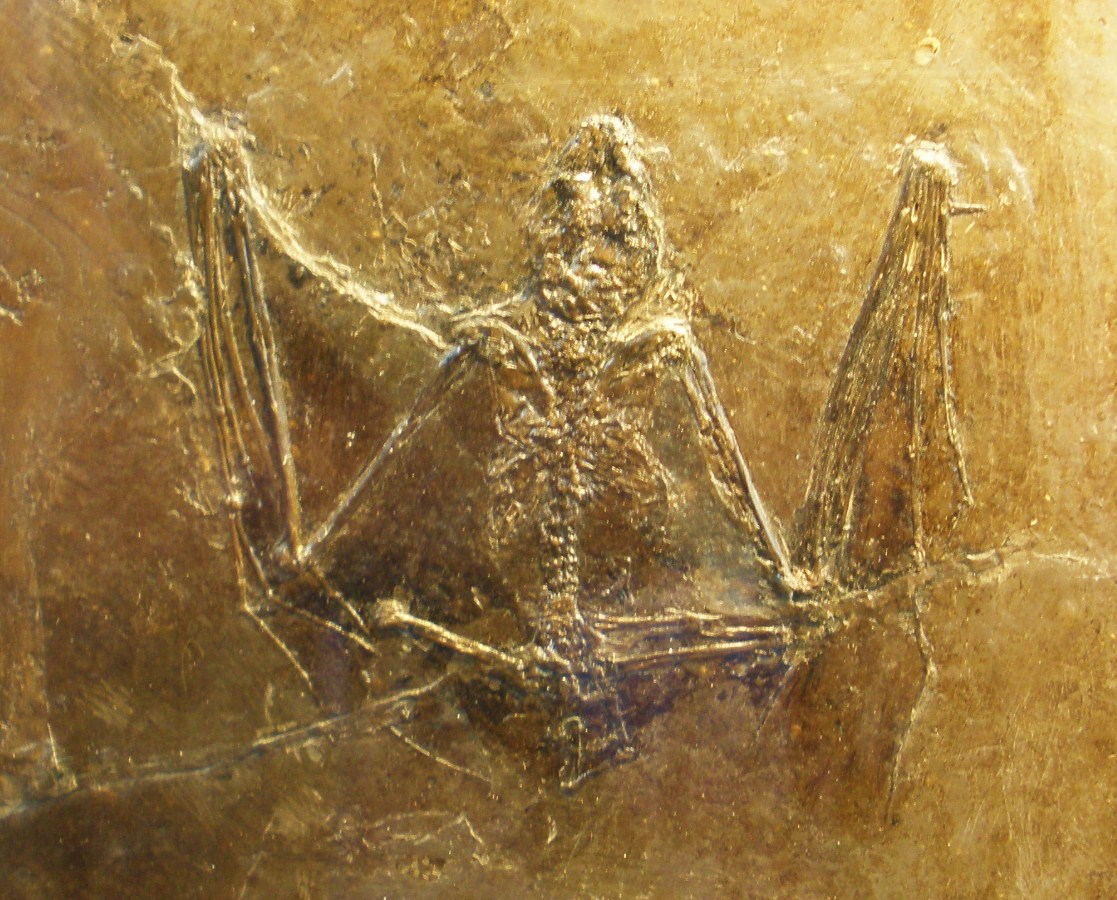
Fossil P. tupaiodon in Musee d'Histoire Naturelle, Brussels

Fossils of both species of Palaeochiropteryx were first recovered from the Messel Pit, near the village of Messel, Germany in 1917. They were described and named by the Swiss naturalist Pierre Revilliod. He placed them under their own family – Palaeochiropterygidae. The name Palaeochiropteryx means "Ancient hand-wing", from Greek παλαιός (palaios, "old"), χείρ (kheir, "hand"), and πτέρυξ (pteruks, "wing"). There are two major reasons as to why the discovery of these fossils is of importance and value; (1) this discover alters perceived relationships among extant forms at a few poorly supported nodes; and (2) the newly found fossils affect some character polarities (slightly changing tree topology), and also changes the levels at which transformations appear to apply (altering perceived support for some clades).

The two species have only been found at Messel. They are quite common and account for three quarters of all bat fossils found there, with Archaeonycteris, Hassianycetris, and Tachypteron making up the rest. Like other fossils from the locality, they are often found in remarkable states of preservation, retaining traces of fur, stomach contents, wing membranes, and even ears. The two species belonging to the genus are the following:

- †Palaeochiropteryx tupaiodon Revilliod, 1917
- †Palaeochiropteryx spiegeli Revilliod, 1917

In 1980, their parent taxon, Palaeochiropterygidae, was merged with Archaeonycteridae by the paleontologists Björn Kurtén and Elaine Anderson. Authorities specializing in bat fossils, however, maintain the distinction between the two families.

The Messel Pit formation dates from the Lutetian age of the Middle Eocene. Between 48.6 ± 0.2 and 40.4 ± 0.2 million years ago.

Along with Onychonycteris, Icaronycteris, Hassianycetris, and Archaeonycteris; members of Palaeochiropteryx are among the oldest known bats. All are identifiable by more or less complete skeletons. While there are fossils of other older bats such as Australonycteris, these are only recognisable from fragmented examples. Close relatives of Palaeochiropteryx include the Middle Eocene Cecilionycteris, Lapichiropteryx and Microchiropteryx, all recovered from partial remains from Germany, China, and India, respectively.

== Taxonomy and phylogeny ==
The fossil record of bats extends back at least to the early Eocene, and chiropteran fossils are known from all continents except Antarctica. Icaronycteris, Archaeonycteris, Hassianycetris, and Palaeochiropteryx, unlike most other fossil bats, have not been referred to any extant family or superfamily. These Eocene taxa are known from exceptionally well-preserved fossils, and they have long formed a basis for reconstructing the early evolutionary history of Chiroptera.

Smith (1977) suggested that these taxa represent an extinct clade of early microchiropterans which he dubbed Palaeochiropterygoidea. In contrast, Van Valen (1979) argued that these fossil forms are representatives of Eochiroptera, a primitive grade ancestral to both Megachiroptera and Microchiroptera; modern researchers, however, consider this clade to be obsolete. Novacek (1987) reanalyzed morphology of Icaronycteris and Palaeochiropteryx and concluded that they are more closely related to Microchiroptera than to Megachiroptera. Most recently, Simmons and Geisler (1998) found that Icaronycteris, Archaeonycteris, Hassianycteris, and Palaeochiropteryx represent a series of consecutive sister-taxa to extant microchiropteran bats.

Below is the phylogenetic tree from Simmons and Geisler (1998) showing the proposed relationships of Palaeochiropteryx (in bold) with other extinct genera and with extant bats.

- ←
  - Megachiroptera (Old World fruit bats)
  - - Icaronycteris
    - - Archaeonycteris
      - - - **Palaeochiropteryx**
          - Microchiroptera (Echolocating bats)

== Description ==
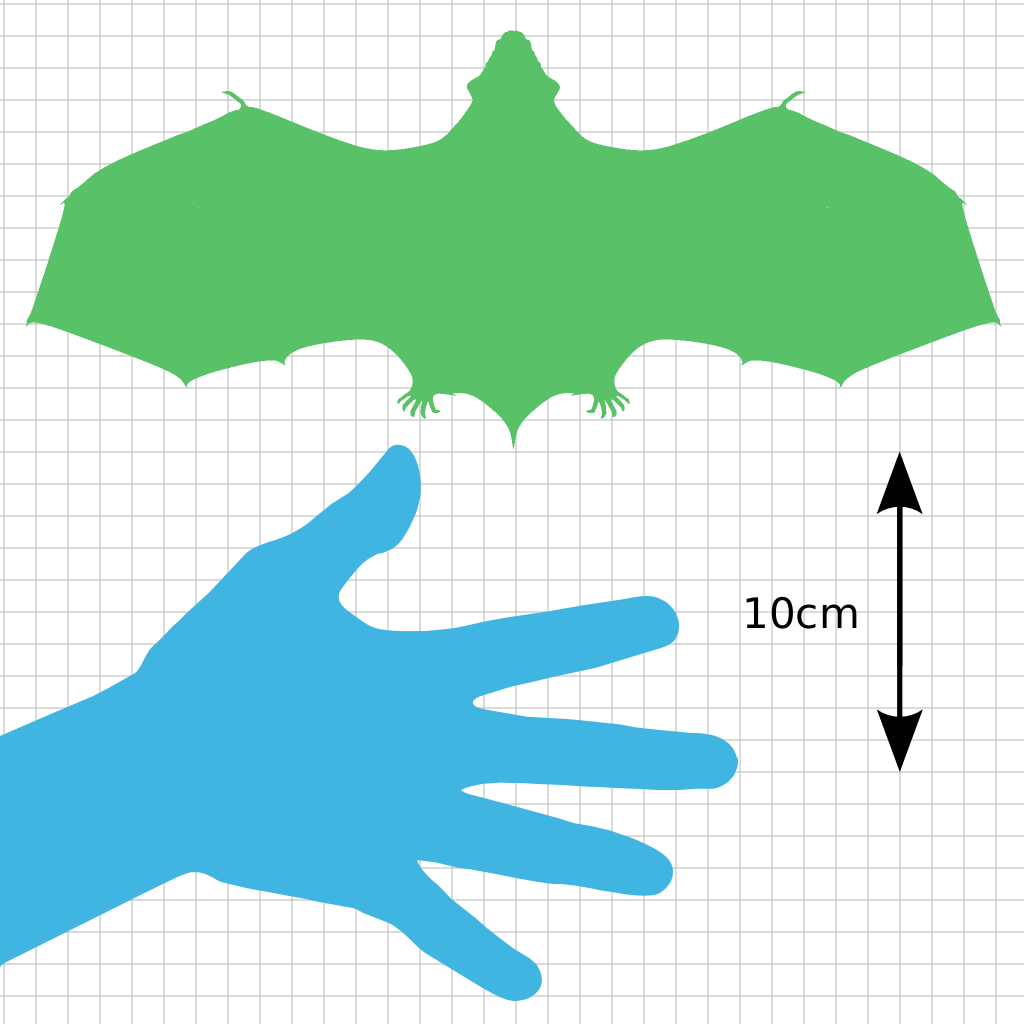
Approximate size of Palaeochiropteryx (wingspan: 25 to 30 cm (9.8 to 11.8 in)), in comparison to an average adult male human hand (19 cm (7.5 in)).

Palaeochiropteryx differed little from modern bats, a surprising fact given their relative age. Palaeochiropteryx had wings formed from enlarged hands, even though their wings were less advanced than the modern bats. For example, they still possessed a claw in the index finger.

Both P. tupaiodon and P. spiegeli were small bats. P. spiegeli is slightly larger than P. tupaiodon. P. tupaiodon had an estimated body mass of 7 to 10 g (0.015 to 0.022 lb) and a forearm length of 39 to 46 mm (1.5 to 1.8 in). P. spiegeli was slightly larger and heavier, with an estimated body mass of 10 to 13 g (0.022 to 0.029 lb) and a forearm length of 43 to 49 mm (1.7 to 1.9 in). They had wingspans between 25 and 30 cm (9.8 and 11.8 in) in length.

The complete dentition of Palaeochiropteryx is known. They had 38 teeth, composed of four upper and six lower incisors, four canine teeth, twelve premolars, and twelve molars. Their dental formula is the same as at least three living families of bats, such as bats from the genus Myotis.

Analysis of melanosomes preserved in the hairs of Palaeochiropteryx specimens suggests that they contained phaeomelanin, which would have given it a brown colour in life like many living bat species.

== Paleobiology and paleoecology ==
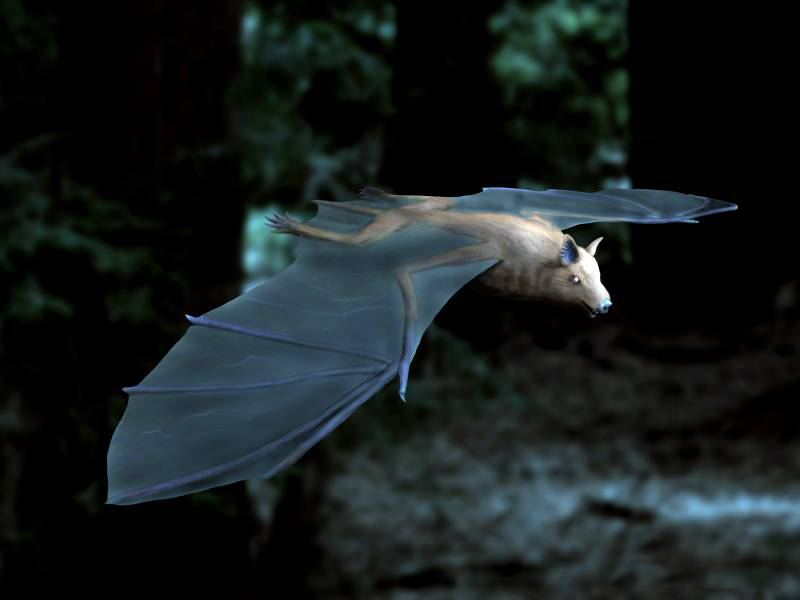
Restoration of Palaeochiropteryx tupaiodon

Messel Pit (known in German as Grube Messel) is one of the most famous and richest fossil sites of the world. The site is renowned for the quality of preservation in the fossils found. Preserved in very fragile bituminous shale, they often retain exquisite details of the soft parts of animals and plants. As its name suggests, the pit is a dry depression about 60 m (200 ft) deep; the surface is around 200 m (660 ft) above sea level. It covers an area approximately 1,000 m (3,300 ft) by 700 m (2,300 ft).

48 million years ago, the pit was a small but very deep lake, originally at least 190 m (620 ft) deep. It was located around 10° south of its current location in a tropical and subtropical Eocene Europe. Messel Pit was volcanic in origin, probably a caldera created by a massive volcanic eruption. It remained geologically and tectonically active during the Eocene, intermittently releasing puffs of poisonous volcanic gases. A virtually stagnant lake, its low oxygen levels enabled the types of preservation found in its fossils.

Messel pit was surrounded by a lush tropical jungle ecosystem teeming with wildlife. Among these were several bat species, including Palaeochiropteryx. Fossils of Palaeochiropteryx (particularly Palaeochiropteryx tupaiodon) occur in great abundance in the pit. They account for three-fourths of all recovered bat fossils in the area.

The fossils recovered are usually of healthy adults with full stomachs, making the reasons why they ended up at the bottom of a lake a bit of a mystery. They may have been snagged or poisoned by thick algal mats on the surface of the lake as they swooped down to drink. Or they may have been knocked out midair by poisonous fumes rising from the lake and subsequently drowned.

The small bodies of Palaeochiropteryx coupled with their relatively broad wingspan indicate that they may have been low level flyers, much like some modern bats with the same body structure. They specialized in hunting close to the ground, beneath the jungle canopy and among vegetation unlike other bats found in Messel Pit which flew at higher altitudes (an early evidence of niche partitioning). They had low wing loading and low aspect ratios, suggesting that they were relatively slow flyers but were able to maneuver in midair quickly – essential for avoiding collisions with the numerous obstacles near the forest floor. This fact may have made them especially vulnerable to the poisonous gases of the former Messel lake, explaining the abundance of their fossils.

The shape of their teeth and the stomach contents of the numerous extremely well preserved fossils of the Messel Pit indicate that Palaeochiropteryx were insectivorous. P. tupaiodon fed almost exclusively on (presumably slow-moving) moths of the primitive Microlepidoptera family. P. spiegeli, on the other hand, also consumed caddisflies (Trichoptera) in addition to moths. Most members of those insect families are active at night, giving a strong indication that Palaeochiropteryx were also nocturnal, or at best, active during twilight (crepuscular).

=== Echolocation ===
From the results of radiographic analysis, Palaeochiropteryx (as well as Archaeonycteris and Icaronycteris) all have enlarged cochleae relative to the size of their skulls. They are still smaller than that of modern echolocating insectivorous bats (Microchiroptera) but they are already larger than that of modern non-echolocating fruit-eating bats (Megachiroptera). Along with their known diets and habits, this is a clear evidence that Palaeochiropteryx was very much capable of echolocation like modern microchiropterans.

== See also ==
- Animal echolocation
- Bat wing development
- Flying primates theory
