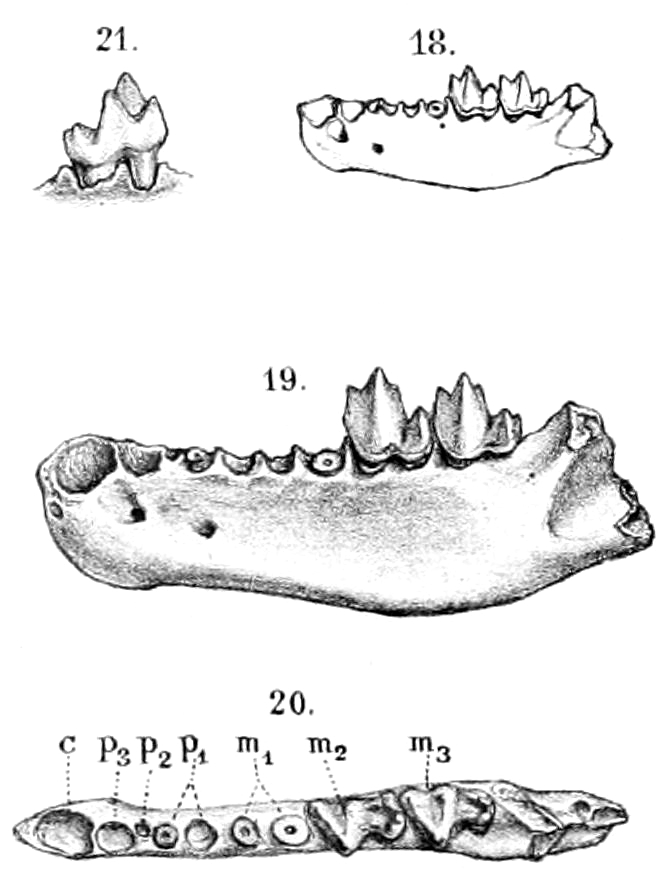

Scientific classification
- Kingdom: Animalia
- Phylum: Chordata
- Class: Mammalia
- Infraclass: Placentalia
- Order: Chiroptera
- Family: †Necromantidae
- Genus: †Necromantis

Type species
- †Necromantis adichaster Weithofer, 1887

Species
- † Necromantis adichaster; † Necromantis marandati; † Necromantis gezei; † Necromantis fragmentatum

Synonyms
- † Necromantis planifrons Revilliod 1920; † Necromantis grandis Revilliod 1920

= Necromantis =

Necromantis Temporal range: 44–36 Ma Middle to Late Eocene

Extinct genus of bats

Necromantis is an extinct genus of bat that lived during the Eocene. Its fossils are found in the Quercy Phosphorites Formation of France and the Djebel Chambi in Tunisia. Specimens of Necromantis are notable for their large size and specialization towards a predatory lifestyle.

== History ==
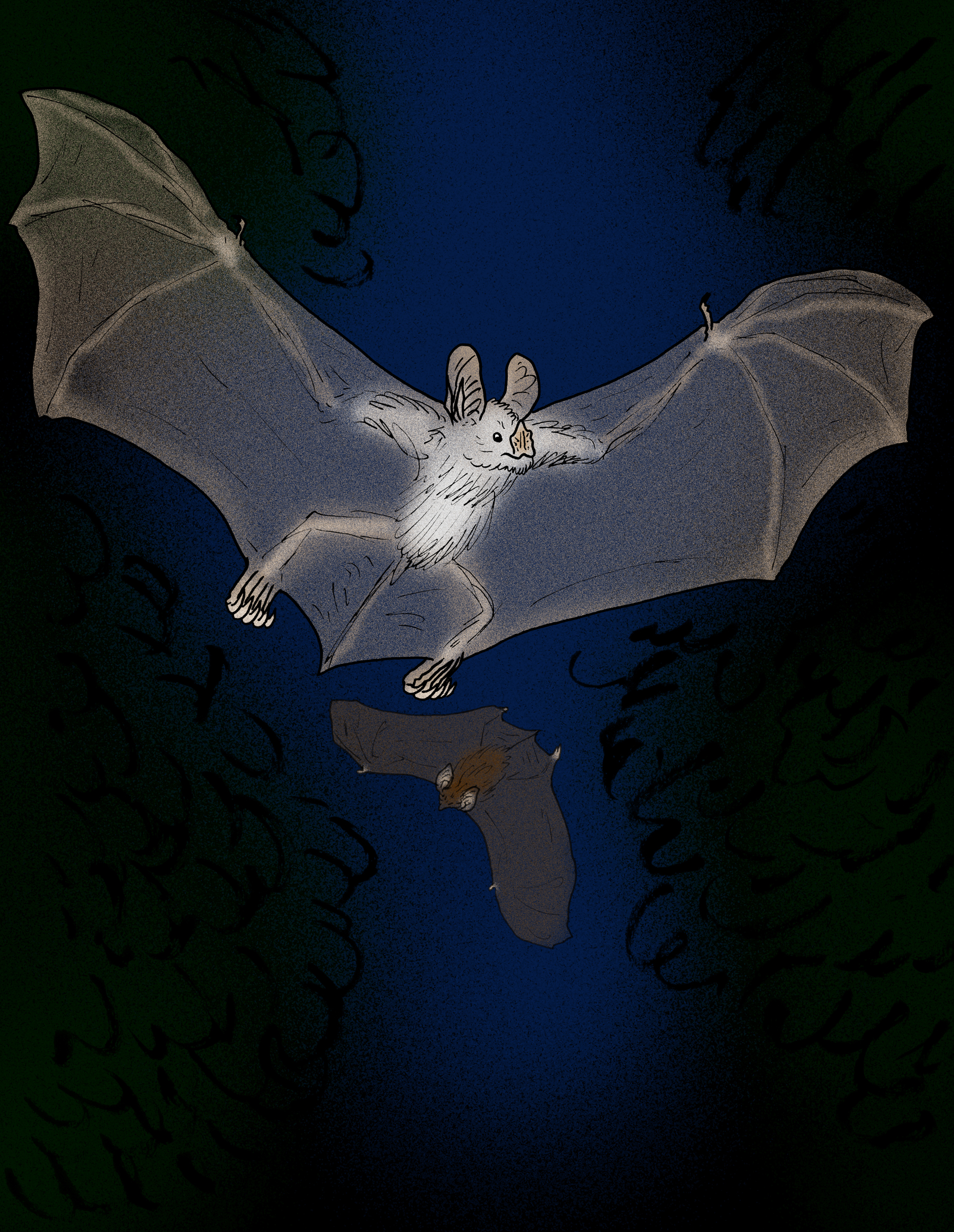
Restoration of N. adichaster as a rhinolophoid

The type species, N. adichaster, was first described by A. Weithofer in 1887 on the basis of fragmentary fossils from the Eocene deposits of the Quercy Phosphorites Formation. Weithofer did not designate a type specimen, simply describing a lower jaw.

This material was later described in more detail by Pierre Revilliod in 1920, offering the holotype the number QW627. He described additional material, and classified it within five species: N. adichaster, N. gezei, N. marandati, N. planifrons and N. grandis.

More recently, E. Maitre has described the fossils in more detail. N. grandis and N. planifrons have been considered indistinguishable from N. adichaster, but N. gezei and N. marandati may be distinct enough to retain their respective statuses as distinct species.

Several indeterminate bat fossils in France may belong to Necromantis. Currently, only jaws and skulls are known, with a single humerus known as a postcranial remain.

More recently, Necromantis fragmentatum has been found in the Late Eocene deposits of Djebel Chambi, Tunisia. This north African species is known from several isolated teeth.

== Description ==
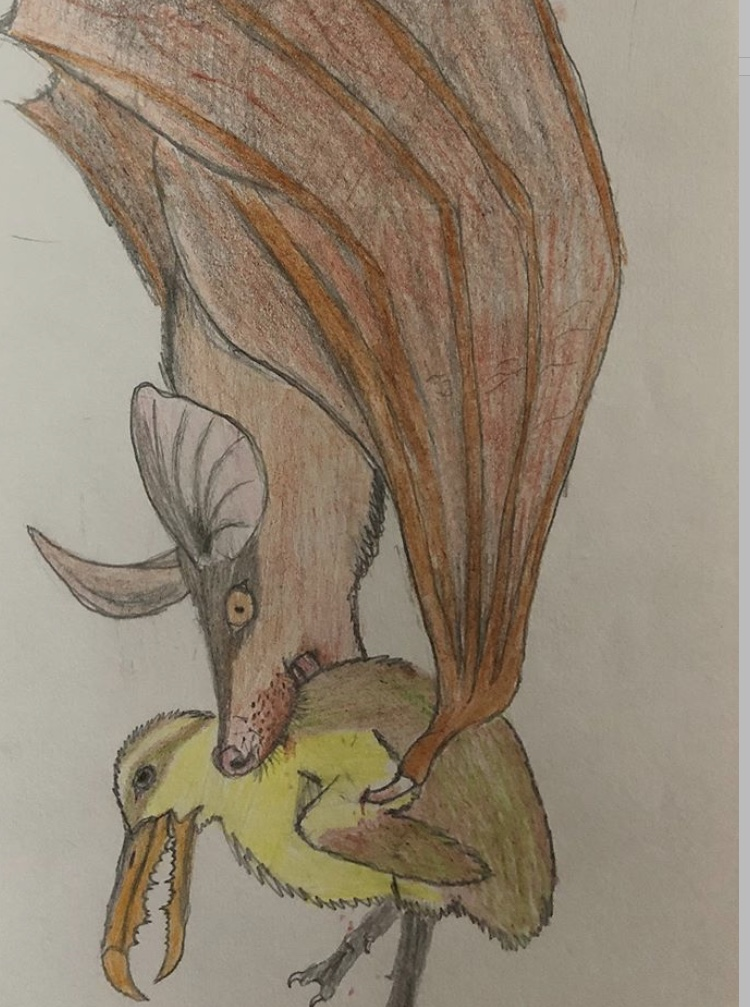
Artist's reconstruction of N. adichaster preying on a Gigantornis chick

Necromantis adichaster has a skull length of about 32 mm and an estimated weight of 47 g, making it one of the largest bats in the Quercy Formation. Due to the lack of postcranial remains aside from a humerus, its exact wingspan is unclear. The other two species are smaller and possess several differences in regards to the trigon and cingulum.

As noted by most researchers, Necromantis is unique among extinct and extant bats due to the sheer robustness of its jaws and skull. Its jaws are rather short and broad, bearing proportionally large teeth. The mandible is deep and thick and bears deep fossae; combined with the presence of a wide zygoma and a high-positioned condyle, it suggests that Necromantis had large, well developed masseters. The teeth themselves are strongly convergent with those of carnivoran mammals, bearing carnassial-like M1 and M2. The sagittal crest was tall, though less so than some other carnivorous bats like Vampyrum spectrum or Macroderma gigas.

== Biology ==
Necromantis has a strong negative tilting of the head, a characteristic thought to correlate with nasal-emission echolocation in bats, as seen in forms like megadermatids and phyllostomids, though it is not clear if Necromantis had a nose-leaf, too.

Its powerful jaws, combined with the specialised dentition, strongly suggest that Necromantis was a carnivore, feeding primarily on other vertebrates. The shearing teeth and strong masseters suggest that it was more specialised to grind and crush flesh and bone than were other bat species. In particular, the angular process of the dentary implies that crushing force was much more important than the width of gape, unlike modern predatory bats.

Due to its large eyes and expanded petrosals, Necromantis might have hunted like modern megadermatids and phyllostomids, relying on low frequency-echolocation and passive listening. Such bats inspect their surroundings from a perch, locate vertebrate prey like birds and mammals visually and by sound, and ambush it, killing it by biting at the back of the head.

== Evolution and phylogeny ==
Currently, Necromantis is placed in the family Necromantidae, along with the extinct genus Cryptobune, but their position relative to other bat families remains uncertain. Weithofer originally classified Necromantis as a megadermatid, and Revilliod later as a phyllostomid, but similarities to either clade were ultimately deemed to be inconclusive and likely derived from convergent evolution. More recently, a relationship with emballonurid bats has been proposed, possibly as a basal member descended from the early Eocene radiation of this clade, but currently this is inconclusive as well. Most recently, Necromantidae has been recovered as an early diverging lineage of stem bats.

== Ecology ==
Necromantis occurs in the Quercy Formation deposits estimated to date from the Middle to Late Eocene, 44-36 million years ago. The regional climate is thought to have been tropical in nature, marked by dense rainforests. Much like modern equatorial forests, the Quercy Formation bears a massive diversity of bat species; though the overall diversity of the region is thought to be incomplete, there are representatives of the still-extant Vespertilionidae, Molossidae, Hipposideridae and Emballonuridae (the former three still occur in Europe), as well as the now extinct Palaeochiropterygidae and Mixopterygidae.
