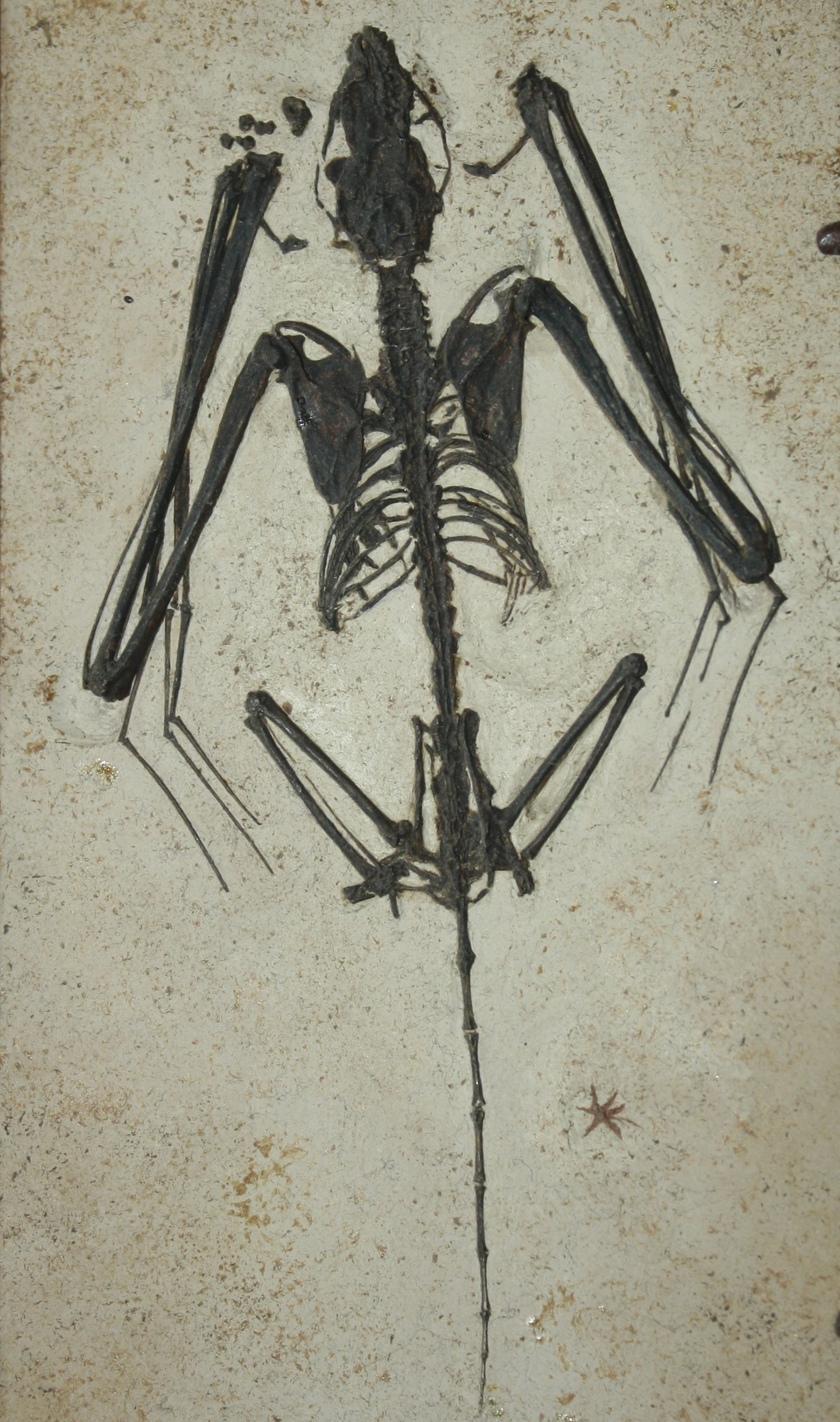
- Icaronycteris index holotype cast, American Museum of Natural History
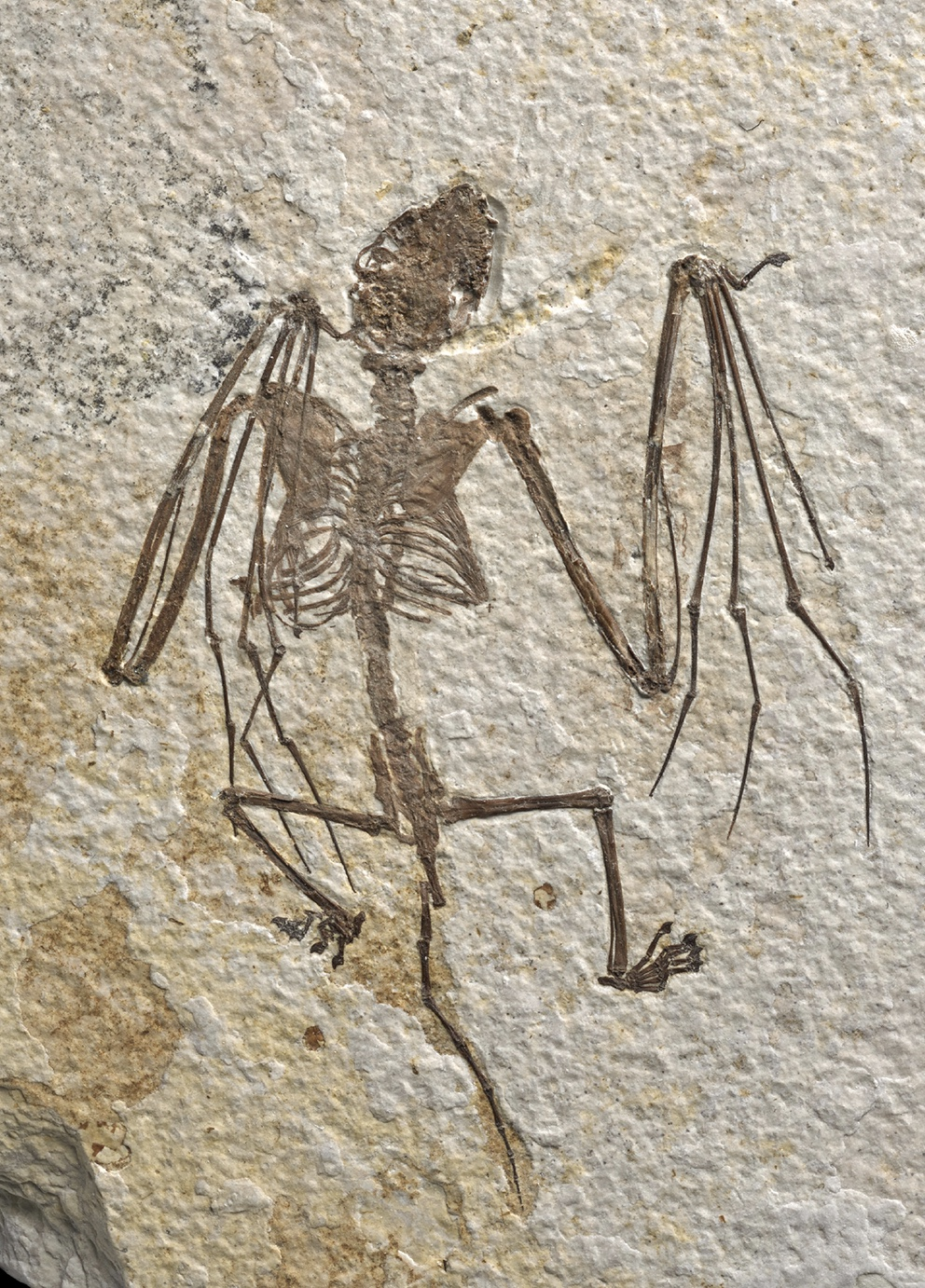
- Icaronycteris gunnelli holotype, American Museum of Natural History

Scientific classification
- Kingdom: Animalia
- Phylum: Chordata
- Class: Mammalia
- Order: Chiroptera
- Family: †Icaronycteridae
- Genus: †Icaronycteris; Jepsen 1966

Species
- †Icaronycteris gunnelli Rietbergen et al. 2023; †Icaronycteris index Jepsen 1966; †Icaronycteris menui? Russell, Louis & Savage 1973; †Icaronycteris sigei? Smith et al. 2007

= Icaronycteris =

Icaronycteris Temporal range: Early Eocene

Extinct genus of bats

Icaronycteris is an extinct genus of microchiropteran (echolocating) bat that lived in the early Eocene, approximately 52.2 million years ago, making it the earliest bat genus known from complete skeletons, and the earliest known bat from North America.

Multiple exceptionally preserved specimens, among the best preserved bat fossils, are known from the Green River Formation of North America. The best known species is I. index. Fragmentary material from France has also been tentatively placed within Icaronycteris as the second species I. menui. I. sigei is based on well-preserved fragments of dentaries and lower teeth found in Western India. In 2023, the species I. gunnelli also from the Green River Formation was distinguished from I. index, and I. menui and I. sigei were proposed to be removed from the genus due to them not being closely related.

== Description ==
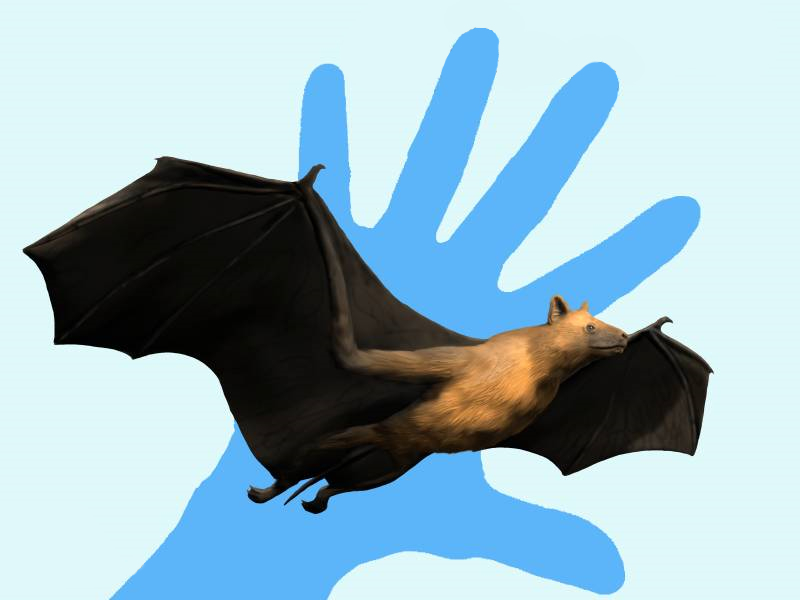
Restoration of I. index

Icaronycteris measured about 14 centimetres (5.5 in) long and had a wingspan of 37 centimetres (15 in).

Icaronycteris closely resembled modern bats, but had some primitive traits. The tail was much longer and not connected to the hind legs with a skin membrane, the first wing finger bore a claw and the body was more flexible. Similarly, it had a full set of relatively unspecialised teeth, similar to those of a modern shrew. Its anatomy suggests that, like modern bats, Icaronycteris slept while hanging upside down, holding onto a tree branch or stone ridge with its hind legs.

== Phylogeny ==
According to Simmons & Geisler 1998, Icaronycteris is the most basally diverging genus, followed by Archaeonycteris, Hassianycetris, and Palaeochiropteryx, in a series leading to extant microchiropteran bats.

Rietbergen et al. 2023 found Onychonycteris to be sister to the North American species of Icaronycteris. This position was supported by Jones et al. (2024), who found Icaronycteris index and I. gunnelli among a clade including Xylonycteris stenodon, Icaronycteris? menui, Archaeonycteris? storchi, Archaeonycteris brailloni, and Protonycteris gunnelli (Icaronycteridae sensu lato). Sister to the Icaronycteridae clade was a clade comprising nearly all known members of Onychonycteridae. Icaronycteris? sigei was recovered well outside of Icaronycteridae in the latter study, falling sister to members of Archaeonycteridae.

- ←
  - Megachiroptera
  - - Icaronycteris
    - - Archaeonycteris
      - - - Palaeochiropteryx
          - Microchiroptera (Echolocating bats)

== See also ==
- Onychonycteris
- Australonycteris
