= Matthesia =

Matthesia Temporal range: Middle Eocene, 48.6–40.4 Ma

Scientific classification
- Kingdom: Animalia
- Phylum: Chordata
- Class: Mammalia
- Order: Chiroptera
- Family: †Archaeonycteridae
- Genus: †Matthesia; Sigé and Russell 1980

Species
- †Matthesia germanica; †Matthesia insolita

Extinct genus of bats

Matthesia was a primitive bat genus in the family Palaeochiropterygidae. Matthesia is represented by two species known from the middle Lutetian of Geiseltal, Germany. It may be a junior synonym of Palaeochiropteryx.
