= Sheep Pass Formation =

Geologic formation in Nevada, United States

- Stratigraphic range: Latest Cretaceous to Paleogene
- Type: Geological formation
- Sub-units: 6 members (A to F)

Location
- Region: Nevada
- Country: United States

The Sheep Pass Formation is a geologic formation in Nevada. It preserves fossils dating back to the Paleogene period.

== Fossil content ==
=== Vertebrates ===
Mammals
Genus	Species	Presence	Material	Notes	Images
Apatemys	A. bellus	Near Ely, Nevada.		An apatothere.	
Elymys	E. complexus	Near Ely, Nevada.		A rodent, possibly of the family Zapodidae.	
Ischyromyidae		Near Ely, Nevada.			
Knightomys		Near Ely, Nevada.		A rodent represented by material not assignable to species.	
Mattimys		Near Ely, Nevada.		A rodent represented by material not assignable to species.	
Microparamys	M. sambucus	Near Ely, Nevada.		A rodent.	
Notharctus	N. tenebrosus	Near Ely, Nevada.	Upper and lower jaws.	A primate.	
Nyctitheriidae		Near Ely, Nevada.		At least one nyctitheriid present.	
Palaeochiropteryx	P. sambuceus	"Elderberry Canyon Quarry in the Egan Range near Ely, White Pine County".	Partial skeleton (USNM PAL 417350) and left dentary (USNM PAL 706598).	A palaeochiropterygid bat.	
Pantolestes	P. longicaudus	Near Ely, Nevada.		A pantolestid.	
Pauromys	P. exallos	Near Ely, Nevada.		A rodent.	
Reithroparamys	R. delicatissimus	Near Ely, Nevada.		A rodent.	
Reithroparamys	cf. R. huerfanensis	Near Ely, Nevada.		A rodent.	
Sciuravus	S. sp.	Near Ely, Nevada.		A rodent represented by material not assignable to species.	
Sonor	S. handae	"Elderberry Canyon Quarry in the Egan Range near Ely, White Pine County".	Left dentary (USNM PAL 544091).	A vespertilionid bat.	
cf. Tetrapassalus	cf. T. mckennai	Near Ely, Nevada.		An epoicotheriid.	
Trogolemur	T. myodes	Near Ely, Nevada.		An anaptomorphine primate.	
Volactrix	V. simmonsae	"Elderberry Canyon Quarry in the Egan Range near Ely, White Pine County".	Right and left dentaries.	An onychonycterid bat.	

Amphibians
Genus	Species	Presence	Material	Notes	Images
Eorubeta	E. nevadensis	Member C (south Egan Range).		A frog.	
Palaeobatrachus	P. occidentalis	Member B.		A frog.	

=== Invertebrates ===
Crustaceans
Genus	Species	Presence	Material	Notes	Images
Clinocypris?	C.? sp.	Member B.		An ostracod.	
Cypridea	C. bicostata	Member B.		An ostracod.	
Paracypridopsis?	P.? sp.	Member B.		An ostracod.	

Molluscs
Genus	Species	Presence	Material	Notes	Images
Hydrobia		Member B.		A snail.	
Valvata		Member B.		A snail.	

== See also ==
- List of fossiliferous stratigraphic units in Nevada
- Nevadaplano
- Paleontology in Nevada
