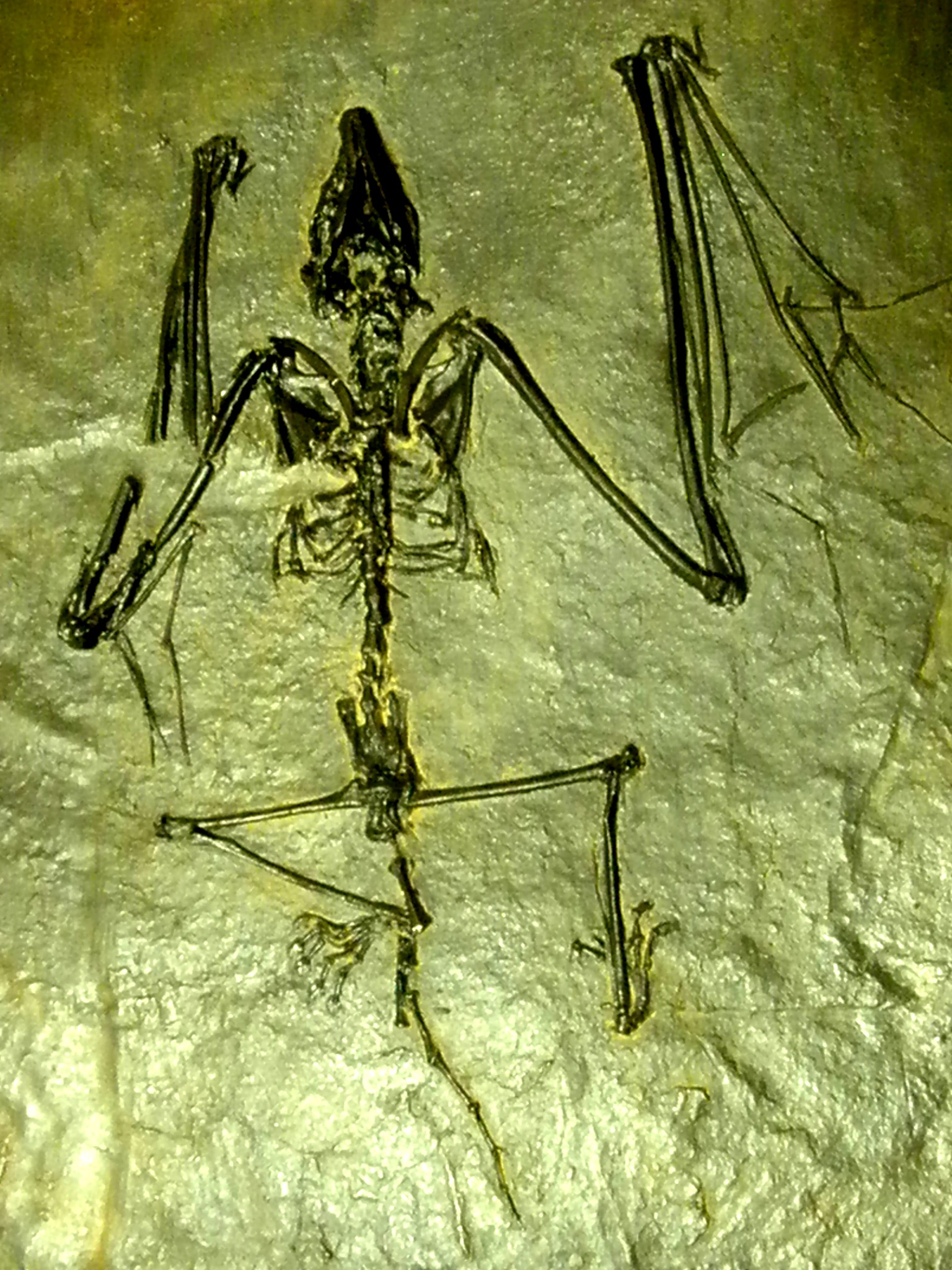
- Archaeonycteris fossil from the Natural History Museum of Milan

Scientific classification
- Kingdom: Animalia
- Phylum: Chordata
- Class: Mammalia
- Order: Chiroptera
- (unranked): Microchiropteramorpha
- Family: †Archaeonycteridae; Revilliod, 1917

Type genus
- †Archaeonycteris Revilliod, 1917

Genera
- See text

Synonyms
- Archaeonycterididae Revilliod, 1917

= Archaeonycteridae =

Archaeonycteridae Temporal range: Ypresian to Lutetian (Middle Eocene)

Extinct family of bats

Archaeonycteridae (formerly spelled Archaeonycterididae) is a family of extinct bats. It was originally erected by the Swiss naturalist Pierre Revilliod as Archaeonycterididae to hold the genus Archaeonycteris. It was formerly classified under the superfamily Icaronycteroidea (disused) by Kurten and Anderson in 1980. In 2007, the spelling was corrected to Archaeonycteridae and it was reclassified to the unranked clade Microchiropteramorpha by Smith et al.. The family Palaeochiropterygidae was also merged into Archaeonycteridae by Kurten and Anderson, but modern authorities specializing in bat fossils maintain the distinction between the two.

They existed from the Ypresian to the Lutetian ages of the Middle Eocene epoch (55.8 to 40.4 million years ago).

The family is known to closely resemble modern bat species from the well preserved specimens found in the Messel Pit Fossil Site in Germany. Other discoveries were made in Europe and other areas of the Northern Hemisphere that restricted the known distribution range to sites associated with the Laurasian land mass. This range of the family was extended to include a species found in 1990 at the Murgon fossil site on the Australian continent, and they appear to have become globally dispersed during the early Miocene.

== Genera ==
It contains five genera. The following list may be incomplete or inaccurate:

- Archaeonycteris Revilliod, 1917
  - Archaeonycteris trigonodon Revilliod, 1917 - Messel Pit (Lutetian), Germany
  - Archaeonycteris pollex Storch & Habersetzer, 1988 - Messel Pit (Lutetian), Germany
  - Archaeonycteris brailloni Russell et al., 1973 - Avenay quarry (Ypresian), France
  - Archaeonycteris storchi Smith et al., 2007 - Vastan Lignite Mines (Ypresian), India
- Australonycteris Hand, Novacek, Godthelp & Archer, 1994
  - Australonycteris clarkae Hand, Novacek, Godthelp & Archer, 1994 - Murgon fossil site (Ypresian), Australia
- Matthesia Smith and Storch 1981
  - Matthesia germanica
  - Matthesia insolita
- Protonycteris Smith et al., 2007
  - Protonycteris gunnelli Smith et al., 2007 - Vastan Lignite Mine (Ypresian), India
- Xylonycteris Hand & Sigé, 2017
  - Xylonycteris stenodon Hand & Sigé, 2017 - Ypresian, France
