= Xylonycteris =

Xylonycteris Temporal range: Early Eocene

Scientific classification
- Kingdom: Animalia
- Phylum: Chordata
- Class: Mammalia
- Order: Chiroptera
- Family: †Archaeonycteridae
- Genus: †Xylonycteris
- Species: †X. stenodon

Binomial name
- †Xylonycteris stenodon Hand & Sigé, 2018

Extinct genus of bats

Xylonycteris is an extinct genus of archaeonycterid bat that lived during the Eocene epoch.

== Distribution ==
X. stenodon fossils are known from the Paris Basin and date back to the Early Eocene.
