= Protonycteris =

Protonycteris Temporal range: 55.8–48.6 Ma

Scientific classification
- Domain: Eukaryota
- Kingdom: Animalia
- Phylum: Chordata
- Class: Mammalia
- Order: Chiroptera
- Family: †Archaeonycteridae
- Genus: †Protonycteris; Smith et al., 2007
- Species: †P. gunnelli

Binomial name
- †Protonycteris gunnelli Smith et al., 2007

Extinct genus of bats

Protonycteris was a primitive bat genus in the family Archaeonycteridae with a sole species, Protonycteris gunnelli, found in Vastan Lignite Mine (Ypresian), in India.
