= California River =

Ancient former river system

California River is the name of a northeastward flowing river system that existed in the Cretaceous-Eocene in the western United States. It is so named because it flowed from the Mojave region of California to the Uinta Basin of Utah, transporting sediments along this track towards Lake Uinta.

== Course ==
The river originated in the North American Cordillera of California (Note: The California River is named after its headwaters.) in the Mojave/Alisitos arc, between the Nevadaplano farther north and the Mexicoplano farther south. It then flowed east-northeastward between the Sevier fold-and-thrust belt to the north and the Maria fold-and-thrust belt to the south. It continued northeastward between the Kaibab and the Circle Cliffs uplift and eventually turned due north between the Uncompahgre and San Rafael swells. The course of the river extended over 1,000 kilometres (620 mi). Ancestral Little Colorado River was a tributary, and the ancestral Mogollon Highlands also drained in this river system.

The river ended in the Uinta Basin (Note: This is unlike drainages in the southeastern half of the Colorado Plateau which formed river deltas on the western shore of the Western Interior Seaway and the area of the Gulf of Mexico. Other rivers drained into closed basins.) and Lake Uinta in present-day Utah roughly where the Green River exits the basin, forming a river delta that today comprises the voluminous Colton Formation and with its sediment covering an area of over 3,000 square kilometres (1,200 sq mi). The so-called "Sunnyside Delta" has also been interpreted as a product of the California River.

In the Paleocene, this river system may have formed the headwater of river systems that ended in the Gulf of Mexico through a paleo-Platte River and before that it may have drained into the Arctic Ocean. A drainage through the Little Colorado River valley towards the San Juan Basin is also possible but there is no evidence, and petrological information on sediments excludes that the Piceance Creek Basin as an endpoint of California River waters.

This river system was of similar scale to the present-day Colorado River-Green River system, but with opposite direction. Analogies have been drawn between the California River and the present-day Ili River in Central Asia, both in terms of its geomorphology and the sizes and shapes of their deltas and terminal lakes.

== Hydrology ==
The river had a high but variable discharge, which has been documented from the delta deposits.

== Geological history and present-day evidence ==
The age of the Western Grand Canyon is controversial, with evidence both of an old Mesozoic and a young Neozoic age. In the former case, it is possible that the river created an early Grand Canyon during the Campanian or the Paleocene.

The California River has been proposed to explain the origin of the deltaic Colton Formation, as it has a high volume and similar source rocks are rare in the area of the Uinta Basin. Rock formations of similar origin occur in southeastern California and southwestern Arizona and may have been located along the same drainage. Eroded material from the Kaiparowits Formation probably did not contribute much to the formation of the Colton Formation. The existence of the California river and whether the river that formed the deltaic Colton Formation and the early Grand Canyon were the same are subject to debate.

A similar, but more north-northeasterly drainage to the present-day Kaiparowits Plateau may have existed during the Turonian. During the Cretaceous and Paleogene, the beginning Laramide orogeny disrupted drainages in what today are the western United States, forming several closed basins where drainage ponded from as far as California. The California River existed in the Paleocene and Eocene. During the Paleocene, the collapse of the continental borderland and the Laramide orogeny reversed the course of the California River. In the Eocene, the drainage divide migrated northeastward.
