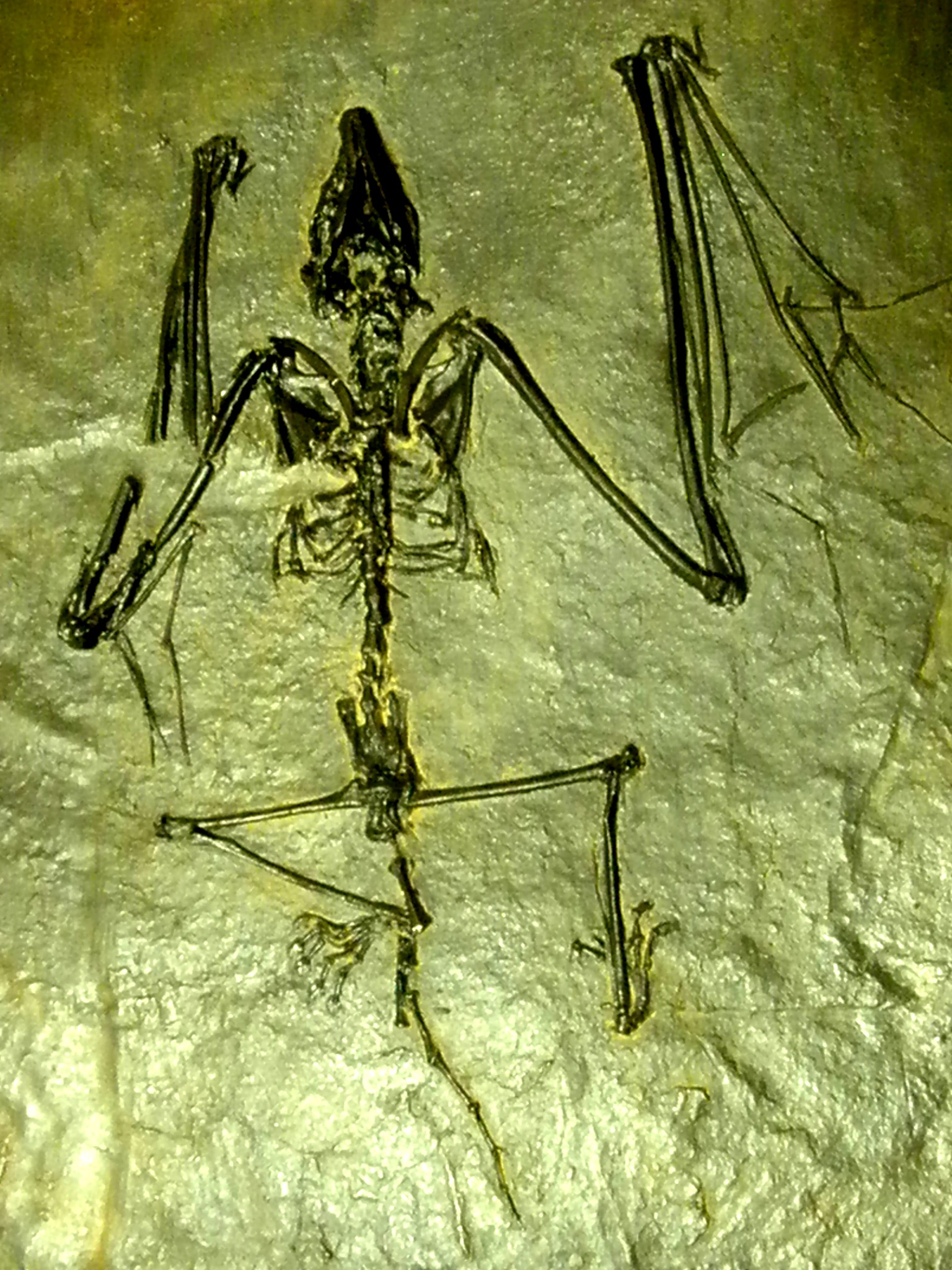

Scientific classification
- Domain: Eukaryota
- Kingdom: Animalia
- Phylum: Chordata
- Class: Mammalia
- Order: Chiroptera
- Family: †Archaeonycteridae
- Genus: †Archaeonycteris; Revilliod, 1917

Species
- see text

= Archaeonycteris =

Archaeonycteris Temporal range: Early-Middle Eocene

Extinct genus of bats

Archaeonycteris is an archaic bat genus whose fossilised remains have been found in Germany, France, England and India.

The genus was established in 1917, when Pierre Revilliod described the material excavated at the Messel Pit as the fossil species Archaeonycteris trigonodon.

- Archaeonycteris trigonodon Revilliod, 1917 - Messel Pit (Lutetian), Germany
- Archaeonycteris pollex Storch & Habersetzer, 1988 - Messel Pit (Lutetian), Germany
- Archaeonycteris brailloni Russell et al., 1973 - Avenay quarry (Ypresian), France
- Archaeonycteris relicta Harrison & Hooker, 2010 - Creechbarrow Limestone Formation, England
- Archaeonycteris storchi Smith et al., 2007 - Vastan Lignite Mines (Ypresian), India

A species discovered at the Silveirinha site in Portugal, Archaeonycteris praecursor, was described in 2009 and estimated to be the oldest of the known taxa, and one of the oldest known bats. The fossil material uncovered in Dorset, England, and described as Archaeonycteris relicta is dated to a later period in the Eocene, this is the most recent known species. The only species to found beyond Europe is the Early Eocene fossil species Archaeonycteris storchi, which occurs in India.

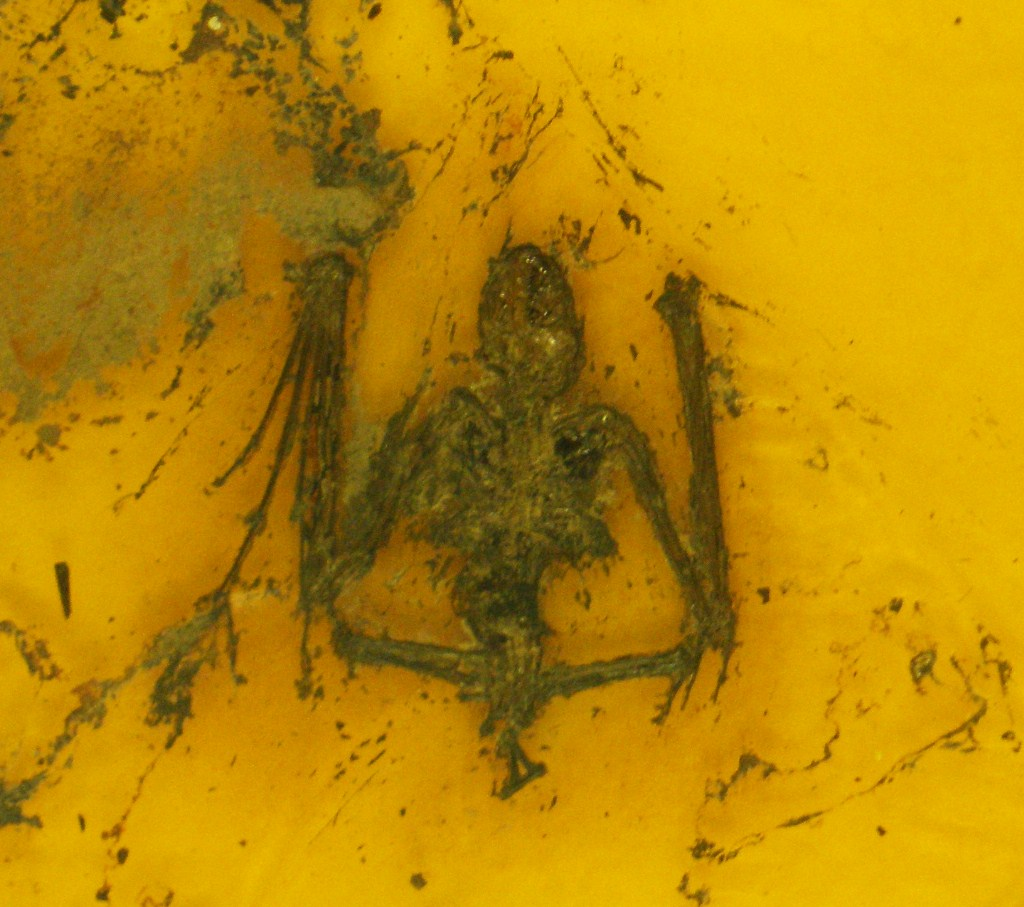
Archaeonycteris trigonodon
