= Anatolianycteris =

Anatolianycteris Temporal range: Middle Eocene

Scientific classification
- Kingdom: Animalia
- Phylum: Chordata
- Class: Mammalia
- Infraclass: Placentalia
- Order: Chiroptera
- Family: †Palaeochiropterygidae
- Genus: †Anatolianycteris
- Species: †A. insularis

Binomial name
- †Anatolianycteris insularis Jones et al., 2018

Anatolianycteris is an extinct genus of bat that inhabited Turkey during the Eocene epoch. It is a monotypic genus containing the species A. insularis.
