= Nevadaplano =

Mesozoic–Cenozoic plateau in North America

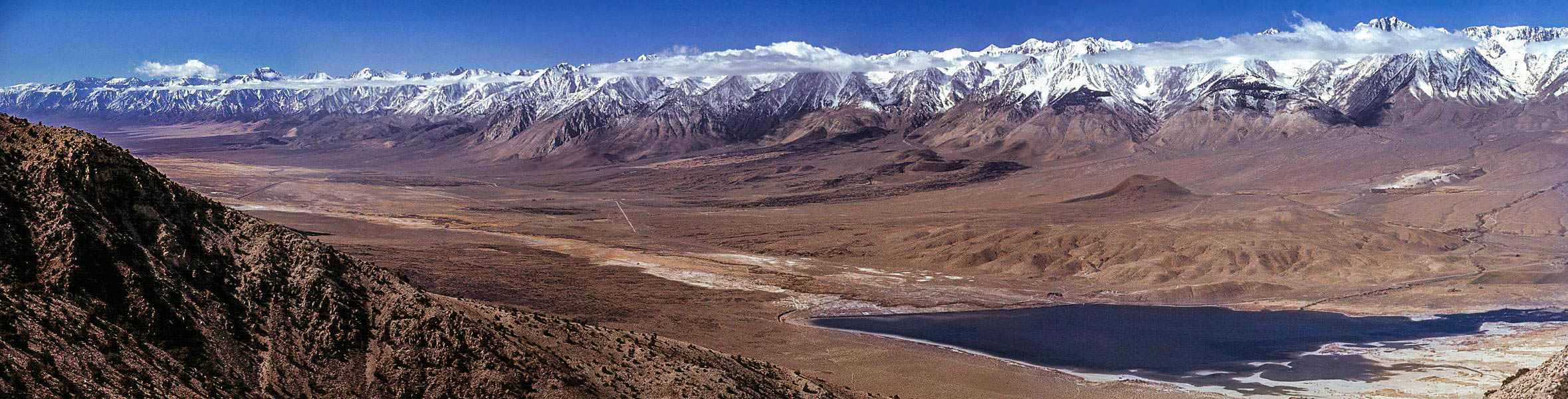
The Sierra Nevada formed the western margin of the Nevadaplano; in this modern image, one would have been looking over the Nevadaplano to the Sierra

The Nevadaplano was a high plateau that is proposed to have covered parts of southwestern North America during the late Mesozoic and early Cenozoic, located in the present-day US states of Idaho, Nevada, Utah and possibly others. It most likely formed during the Cretaceous as a consequence of subduction dynamics and may have reached elevations of 3 kilometres (9,800 ft) and more, although its elevation is controversial. It was flanked on the west by the Sierra Nevada, which was traversed by various valleys that came down from the Nevadaplano. Closed basins and numerous volcanic calderas covered the relatively flat Nevadaplano; large volcanic eruptions distributed ignimbrites over the plateau and down the valleys draining it.

During the Miocene, changes in the tectonic regime may have caused a collapse and dismemberment of the Nevadaplano. Tectonic extension gave rise to the Basin and Range province and separated the Sierra Nevada-Great Valley block from the Nevadaplano, forming today's landscape.

== Research history ==
The existence of the Nevadaplano was proposed in 2004 by DeCelles and named after the Altiplano high plateau of South America. It is also known as the "Great Basin Altiplano". Unlike the present-day Andean Altiplano and Tibetan plateau, the Nevadaplano was dismembered during the Cenozoic and thus its structure and evolution are poorly understood.

== Geologic history ==
The Nevadaplano probably formed as part of either the Sevier or the Laramide Orogeny during the Mesozoic and persisted into the Paleogene. Its growth began either in the Cretaceous or the Jurassic, when significant tectonic shortening took place behind the Sevier orogen. Similar to the present-day Altiplano in South America, the combination of an arid climate, tectonic contraction, weak erosion and the accumulation of volcanic rocks both in and below the crust helped raise the Nevadaplano during the Cretaceous, when flat subduction was taking place. Later, its southern part was probably overprinted by the Laramide Orogeny when volcanism shifted far to the east. The exact geologic evolution and character of the Nevadaplano is controversial, however, as is the notion that it was a geologically stable environment.

The Nevadaplano underwent extensional tectonics during the Cenozoic, possibly in a multi-step process. An early stage may have occurred in the Eocene-Oligocene, toward the end of subduction, when the subducting slab steepened again and slab rollback decreased the tectonic forces. At that time, volcanic activity swept southwestward, away from the volcanoes of central Nevada to the Sierra. This may have been accompanied by uplift that would have continued when the Yellowstone hotspot developed in the Miocene. The plateau overrode the heat source of the East Pacific Rise about 28 million years ago.

By far the most significant stage of extension was the later episode of east–west extension and northwestward shearing, which was underway by 16-17 million years ago and continues to a lesser extent today. That extension probably caused the high plateau to lose elevation. The heat flow from the Yellowstone hotspot and the addition of magmas into the crust are mechanisms that could have caused the collapse process. Also during the Miocene, the Sierra Nevada-Great Valley block separated from the Nevadaplano and was tilted to the west along the Sierra Escarpment, beheading a number of westward-going drainages in the process. Former drainages of the Nevadaplano were buried by volcanic rocks and disrupted by tectonic processes. Farther east, the dismemberment of the drainages may have created suitable environments for the evolution of sucker fish.

Miocene extension also created the well-known Basin and Range extension, probably triggered by changes in the plate boundary between the Pacific Plate and the North American Plate. Presently, relic surfaces around the Middle Fork Feather River valley and the high elevations of the northern Basin and Range may be considered remnants of the Nevadaplano.

== The Nevadaplano during its existence ==
The Nevadaplano was located in present-day Nevada and Utah, at the location of the present-day Great Basin, and may have extended from what is present-day central Idaho in the north either to Sonora or southern Nevada in the south. It was a high plateau consisting of a peneplain and reached a width of 400–500 kilometres (250–310 mi). Isotope analysis indicates that the Nevadaplano stood at high elevations, probably higher than or comparable to the then-Sierra Nevada. The elevation of the Nevadaplano exceeded 3 kilometres (1.9 mi), but the exact value is controversial, as is whether it was flat or featured rugged topography. There is evidence of basins at its western margin, although the relief of the Nevadaplano is debated and was probably less than that of the Altiplano.

The Nevadaplano probably drained to internal basins such as the Elko and Uinta Basins, the Western Interior Seaway and westward to the Pacific Ocean. A drainage divide extended from the Mogollon Highlands in the south through the Kingman Uplift into the Nevadaplano. There is some uncertainty in the drainage directions across the Nevadaplano, with some evidence interpreted as indicating that drainage divides shifted over time and that the divide between Nevada and Idaho was offset along a Neoproterozoic lineament. Among the reconstructed drainages are the Tyee and Princeton Rivers from what is present-day north-central Idaho to present-day Oregon and northern California, the Idaho River also from present-day north-central Idaho to the Green River basin and the California River from present-day southernmost California to the Uinta Basin. The northernmost among these rivers may have formed the northern boundary of the Nevadaplano.

Some normal faulting took place within the Nevadaplano, along with the exposure of core complexes, and generated isolated basins. This may have created regional basins in the late Cretaceous similar to those that lie in the present-day Altiplano-Puna region, and which include the Sheep Pass Formation basin and the long-lived Elko Basin. Lake sediments and volcanic rocks accumulated in these basins. The formation of these basins may have been an early stage of the collapse of the Nevadaplano.

=== Geographical and geological boundaries ===
West of the Nevadaplano stood the Sierra Nevada, which was volcanically active until 80 million years ago and featured exposed batholiths from former volcanism. Its exact elevation at the time is unclear, with alternate models proposing either that it had already reached a height similar to today's Sierra Nevada or that it rose to present-day height in the Miocene and Pliocene. Alternatively, the Luning-Fencemaker fold-and-thrust belt may have formed the western boundary.

It probably did not constitute a drainage divide; various east–west trending valleys cut across the Sierra Nevada at that time. Presently filled with volcanic and sedimentary rocks, these valleys were 5–8 kilometres (3.1–5.0 mi) wide, 0.5–1.2 kilometres (0.31–0.75 mi) deep with flat and deeply weathered bottoms. Among these valleys are the Nine Hill and Soda Springs valleys in the Lake Tahoe region and the Stanislaus, Mokelumne and Cataract paleochannels in the Sonora Pass region. There is more evidence for paleovalleys in the northern Sierra Nevada than in the southern, which may either indicate that evidence of cross-Sierra drainage was removed in its southern sector or that the southern Sierra was higher than the central and northern Sierra at the time of the Nevadaplano. Some of these rivers may have been large enough to allow sharks to reach Nevada. The rivers flowing through these valleys deposited the placer gold deposits of California, as part of intense westward sediment transport. On the eastern side, the proto-Platte and proto-Arkansas Rivers drained the Nevadaplano. There, the Arikaree Formation was deposited.

Remnants of the Laramide uplands, the Chusca erg or the Sevier fold-and-thrust belt were located east of the Nevadaplano. The boundary was located at a region corresponding to the present-day Wasatch, Santaquin and Canyon Ranges. A relatively short distance may have separated it there from the Western Interior Seaway. The region of what today is northern Nevada during the Oligocene may have been a gently tilted or closed plateau. To the south, the California River may have separated the Nevadaplano from an analogous high plateau to the south, called "Mexicoplano" or "Arizonaplano". The Colorado Plateau was either to the east of the Nevadaplano or else formed an integral part of the plateau. The San Juan Mountains region may have formed its own upland, the "Colorado-plano".

=== Geology ===
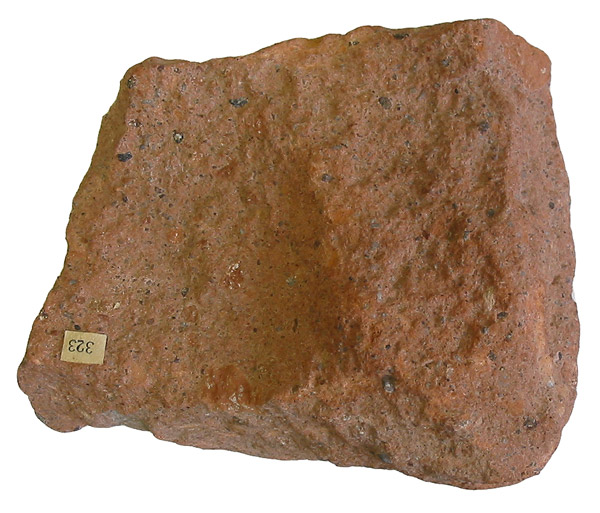
Ignimbrites were scattered across some areas of the Nevadaplano

During the Miocene, volcanic activity covered the Nevadaplano with lahars, lava flows and volcanic sediments. In central Nevada and western Utah, at least 71 calderas located at high elevation erupted ignimbrites which propagated for over 200 kilometres (120 mi) westward and across former valleys in the Sierra Nevada, filling them in during the process. In particular, the 28.9 million year old Campbell Creek tuff covered an area of 55,000 square kilometres (21,000 sq mi) and propagated far east and west of its source area.

The underlying crust had a sialic composition and reached thicknesses of 45–65 kilometres (28–40 mi). It consisted of metamorphic rocks that are now exposed as metamorphic core complexes such as in the Pequop Mountains of Nevada, as well as plutonic rocks including batholiths.

=== Ecosystems and climate ===
Based on the fossils found in the Sheep Pass Formation, the Nevadaplano likely had a cold high-elevation climate. Located in the rain shadow of the Sierra Nevada, it was dry, and therefore experienced only weak erosion. The rain shadow extended east of the Nevadaplano. However, precipitation was enough to cut large valleys into the Sierra Nevada, perhaps aided by the then-warm climate. Pulses of erosion may have occurred during Paleogene climate disturbances, such as the Paleocene–Eocene Thermal Maximum. Vegetation with temperate climate affinities like giant sequoias may have migrated from or through the Nevadaplano to California when the climate cooled during the Oligocene, founding the temperate forest communities of California. Conversely, the plateau might have impeded the migration of animals, although poor fossil preservation impedes a definitive determination of the fauna of the Nevadaplano.

Evidence suggests that lakes and alluvial fans existed on the Nevadaplano, the Sheep Pass Formation constitutes the remnants of such landforms. It is not clear however if the Sheep Pass lake system was at high elevation. Fossils of anurans, birds, bivalves, crustaceans, frogs, lizards, mammals, molluscs, ostracods and snakes have been found there, as well as evidence of algae, charophytes, plants and microbial mats. There are also traces of physical events such as debris flows, periodic desiccation and storms. Lakes formed during the disassembly of the Nevadaplano as well, including these where the Truckee Formation diatomites were emplaced in.
