= Colton Formation =

Geologic formation in Utah, United States

- Stratigraphic range: Paleocene and Eocene
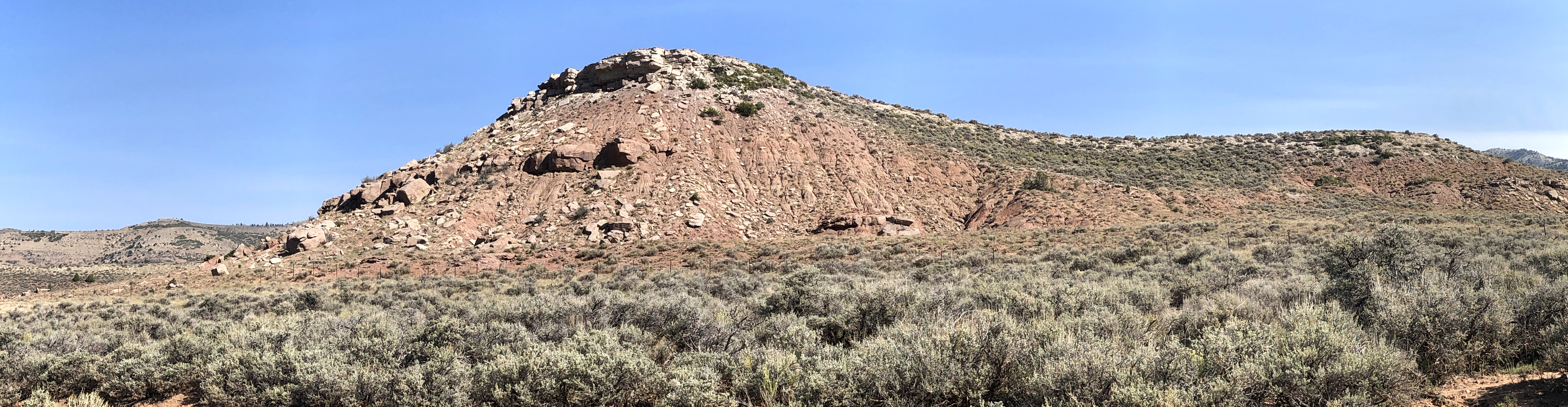
- Typical exposure of the Colton Formation
- Type: Formation
- Underlies: Green River Formation
- Overlies: North Horn Formation
- Area: Central Utah
- Thickness: 200–800 meters (660–2,620 ft)

Lithology
- Primary: Reddish mudstones and sandstones

Location
- Region: Utah
- Country: United States

Type section
- Named by: P.T. Walton 1944

The Colton Formation is a geologic formation in Utah. Its age is based on its position between the Upper Cretaceous-Paleocene North Horn Formation and overlying Green River Formation.

The name was first used by P.T. Walton in 1944 for strata below the Green River Formation at the base of the Roan Cliffs, Utah. However, the type section was first given by E.M. Spieker in 1946. for exposures near the town of Colton on Soldier Summit, Utah County, Utah. Previously, the strata were assigned to the Wasatch Formation, which had become a rather generic name by the US Geological Survey for mudstone-sandstone strata of Eocene age.

The formation is composed of reddish-brown to green beds of mudstone and shaly siltstone, interlayered with yellowish- to grayish-orange and grayish-brown, thin, fine- to medium-grained quartzose sandstone beds. The mudstones are locally variegated in shades of red and gray. Many sandstones are cross-bedded in large and small trough sets and the thicker sandstones are interpreted as deltaic deposits growing into Lake Flagstaff and Lake Uinta.

Root structures and mudcracks are common in the mudstone beds.

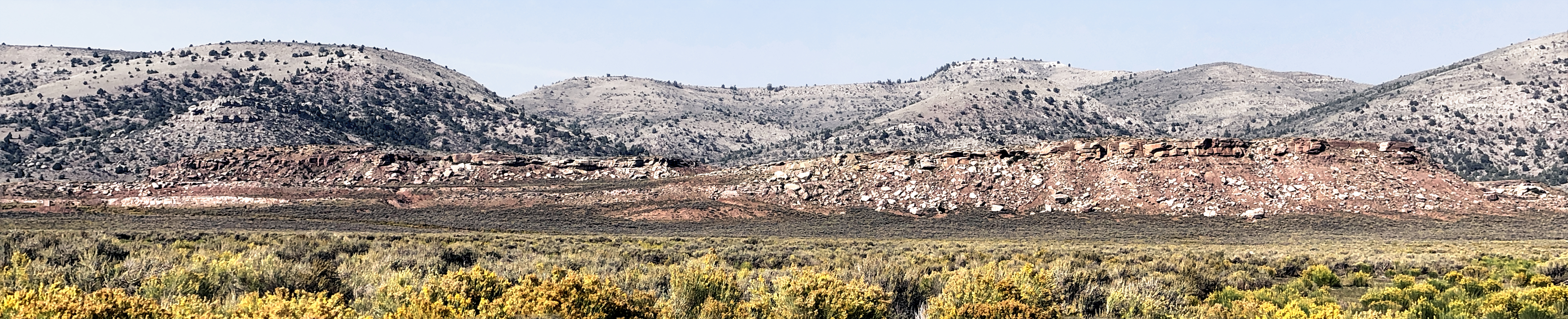
Mudstones and sandstones of the Colton Formation at the base of the Roan Cliffs in the background.

The only fossil described to date is a fragmentary skeleton of the aquatic bird Presbyornis recurvirostrus from a lacustrine limestone.

== See also ==
- California River
- List of fossiliferous stratigraphic units in Utah
- Paleontology in Utah
