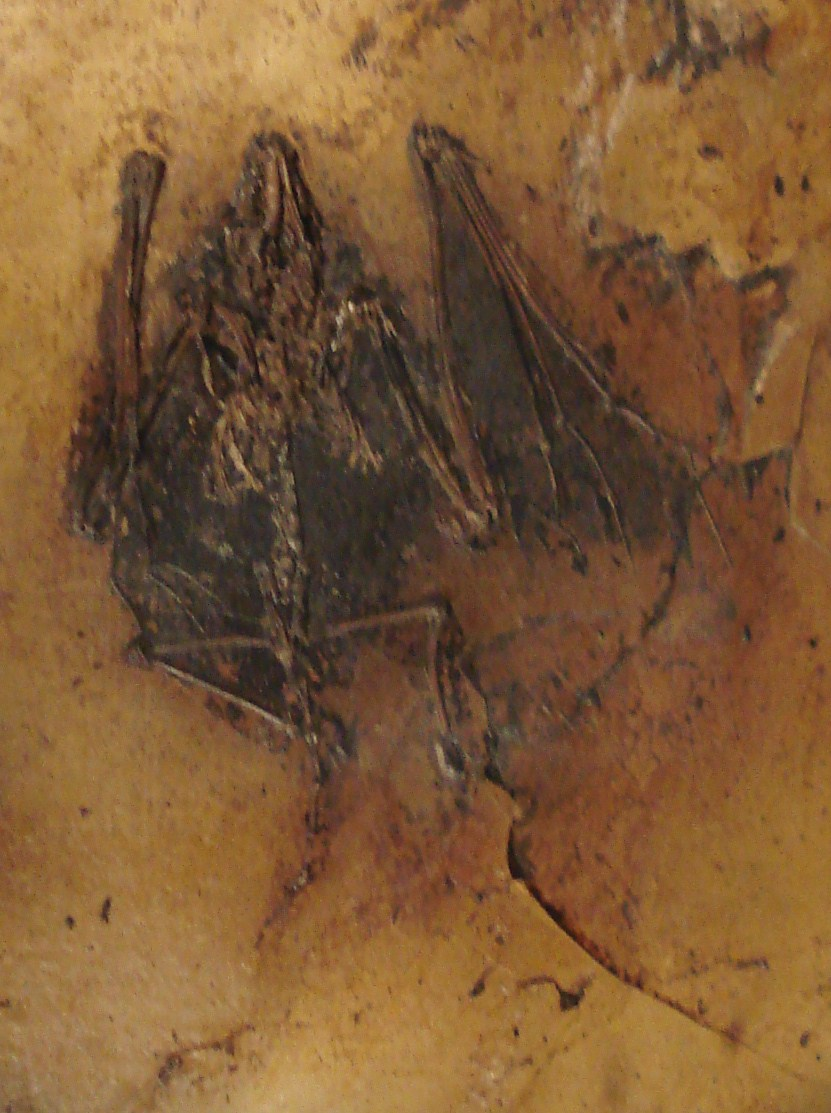
- Palaeochiropteryx tupaiodon from the Jura Museum of Eichstätt, Germany.

Scientific classification
- Kingdom: Animalia
- Phylum: Chordata
- Class: Mammalia
- Infraclass: Placentalia
- Order: Chiroptera
- (unranked): Microchiropteramorpha
- Family: †Palaeochiropterygidae; Revilliod, 1917

Type genus
- †Palaeochiropteryx Revilliod, 1917

Genera
- See text

= Palaeochiropterygidae =

Palaeochiropterygidae Temporal range: Ypresian to Lutetian (Middle Eocene)

Extinct family of bats

Palaeochiropterygidae is a family of extinct bats. It was originally erected by the Swiss naturalist Pierre Revilliod in 1917 after discoveries of Palaeochiropteryx fossils from the Messel Pit of Germany. Palaeochiropterygidae was merged into Archaeonycteridae by Kurten and Anderson in 1980, but modern authorities specializing in bat fossils maintain the distinction between the two. It was classified to the unranked clade Microchiropteramorpha by Smith et al. in 2007.

They existed from the Ypresian to the Lutetian ages of the Middle Eocene epoch (55.8 to 40.4 million years ago).

== Paleobiology ==
Two species of Palaeochiropterygidae, Palaeochiropteryx tupaiodon and P. spiegeli, are known from complete skeletons from the famous Messel Pit fossil deposits in Germany. Palaeochiropteryx tupaiodon is the most common mammal found at Messel. An additional species of Palaeochiropteryx, P. sambuceus, has been described from the middle Eocene of North America. All other species belonging to Palaeochiropterygidae are known only from isolated teeth and jaw fragments from Europe, India, Turkey, and possibly North America.

At Messel, the two species of Palaeochiropteryx are hypothesized to have occupied similar niches to living hipposiderids and rhinolophids that forage close to the ground and among vegetation. Wings with low aspect ratio and wing loading and preserved stomach contents of small moths and caddisflies support the idea that these palaeochiropterygids were slow but maneuverable fliers. The widespread distribution of Palaeochiropterygidae among the northern continents in the early and middle Eocene conflicts with the known morphology of P. tupaiodon and P. spiegeli, however, suggesting that other species of palaeochiropterygids had body plans much more suitable to long distance dispersal.

== Evolutionary relationships ==
Palaeochiropterygidae are generally considered the most advanced of the early bat families. Several phylogenetic analyses have shown Palaeochiropterygidae to be the closest relatives of the living, or crown, groups of bats. Most phylogenetic analyses only include species of fossil bats known from complete skeletons, so relationships of species within Palaeochiropterygidae remain currently unknown.

Both Matthesia and Cecilionycteris may be junior synonyms of Palaeochiropteryx. Stehlinia has been previously considered to be a member of the superfamily Vespertilionoidea, possibly aligned with Natalidae or Kerivoulidae, but is now more commonly recognized as a palaeochiropterygid. Stehlinia, along with Lapichiropteryx and Anatolianycteris, possesses a very simple lower fourth premolar compared to other palaeochiropterygids and a close relationship between those three species has been proposed.

A recent analysis failed to recover a close relationship between most proposed members of Palaeochiropterygidae. The analysis by Jones et al. recovered Lapichiropteryx sister to Hassianycteridae, P. sambuceus among Archaeonycteridae, and Microchiropteryx and Stehlinia as early diverging members of Vespertilionoidea; Cecilionycteris, Matthesia, and Anatolianycteris were not included in the study. A recent study by Hand et al. included only Microchiropteryx and P. tupaiodon, but similarly did not find them to form a clade to the exclusion of non-palaeochiropterygid species. In both recent studies, Palaeochiropterygidae was sister to Hassianycteridae.

== Genera ==
It contains the following genera. The list may be incomplete or inaccurate:

- †Anatolianycteris Jones et al., 2018
  - †Anatolianycteris insularis Jones et al., 2018 - Orhaniye Basin (Lutetian), Turkey
- †Cecilionycteris Heller, 1935

- †Cecilionycteris prisca Heller, 1935 - Geiseltal (Lutetian), Germany

- †Lapichiropteryx Tong, 1997

- †Lapichiropteryx xiei Tong, 1997 - Yuanqu Basin (Ypresian?), China

- †Matthesia Sigé and Russell, 1980
  - †Matthesia insolita Sigé and Russell, 1980 - Geiseltal (Lutetian), Germany
  - †Matthesia germanica Sigé and Russell, 1980 - Geiseltal (Lutetian), Germany
- †Microchiropteryx Smith et al., 2007

- †Microchiropteryx folieae Smith et al., 2007 - Vastan Lignite Mines (Ypresian), India

- †Palaeochiropteryx Revilliod, 1917

- †Palaeochiropteryx tupaiodon Revilliod, 1917 - Messel Pit (Lutetian), Germany
- †Palaeochiropteryx spiegeli Revilliod, 1917 - Messel Pit (Lutetian), Germany
- †Palaeochiropteryx sambuceus Czaplewski et al., 2022 - Elderberry Canyon (Lutetian), United States

- †Stehlinia Revilliod, 1919
  - †Stehlinia gracilis (Revilliod 1922) - Unknown locality, Quercy, France
  - †Stehlinia alia Maitre 2014 - Cuzal, Quercy (MP 13), France
  - †Stehlinia bonisi Sige 1990 - Le Garouillas, Quercy (MP 25), France
  - †Stehlinia minor (Revilliod 1922) - Unknown locality, Quercy, France
  - †Stehlinia pusilla (Revilliod 1922) - Egerkingen (MP 14?), Switzerland
  - †Stehlinia quercyi (Revilliod 1922) - Unknown locality, Quercy, France
  - †Stehlinia revilliodi Maitre 2014 - Cuzal, Quercy (MP 13), France
  - †Stehlinia rutimeyeri (Revilliod 1922) - Egerkingen (MP 14?), Switzerland
