= Australonycteris =

Australonycteris Temporal range: 54.6 Ma Early Eocene

Scientific classification
- Kingdom: Animalia
- Phylum: Chordata
- Class: Mammalia
- Order: Chiroptera
- Family: †Archaeonycteridae
- Genus: †Australonycteris; Hand et al. 1994
- Species: †A. clarkae

Binomial name
- †Australonycteris clarkae Hand et al. 1994

Extinct genus of bats

Australonycteris is an extinct and monotypic genus of microchiropteran bat with the single species Australonycteris clarkae. The species is known from fragmentary remains found at the Murgon fossil site, in south-eastern Queensland, dating to the early Eocene, 54.6 million years ago. It is the oldest bat from the Southern Hemisphere and one of the oldest bats in the world, and inhabited forests and swampy areas, with a diet of insects and possibly small fish.

== Taxonomy ==
A monotypic genus allied to the family Archaeonycteridae, or classified by an indeterminate familial arrangement, describing fossil material collected at Murgon in 1994. The type specimen is a tooth. The material was discovered at the Tingamarra Local Fauna – Boat Mountain deposit, the type and only known location of fossil evidence of the species.

The phylogenetic relationship to other Chiroptera is uncertain, but may represent an early geographic dispersal and separation from the crown clade of bat taxa found on other continents.

The genus name is derived from ancient Greek, indicating a bat with an Australian distribution. The specific epithet honours Elaine Clark, a person closely associated with the palaeontological research at Riversleigh and Murgon.

== Description ==
Australonycteris clarkae, one of the earliest bats in the fossil record, is known from several upper and lower teeth, an edentulous lower-jaw fragment, a partial periotic bone, and several postcranial fragments. It has a forearm length of 40–45 millimetres (1.6–1.8 in), making it a medium-size bat species, and it could echolocate. Australonycteris displayed some differences in dental anatomy, compared to extant bats. Unlike other purported Eocene bats, such as the Wyonycteris species of Wyoming and Europe in the northern hemisphere, Australonycteris clarkae possessed many of the anatomical characteristics of the modern microchiropteran. The tooth tip of A. clarkae shows wear consistent with carrying prey with a hard carapace, such as beetles, or bony skeleton of fish; the body size of the species would make predation of fish at least possible.

Australonycteris is thought to have been fully capable of flight.

== See also ==
- Icaronycteris
