= Vastan Mines =

Limestone mines in Gujarat, India

Vastan Mines are lignite and limestone mines in Gujarat, India. They are under the administration of Gujarat Industries power company limited. Scientists have discovered bat fossils there.
