= Pierre Revilliod =

Swiss naturalist (1883–1954)

Pierre Revilliod (1883–1954) was a Swiss naturalist.

From 1927–1953 Revilliod was a curator and researcher at the Natural History Museum of Geneva. He is best known for his work on fossil bats and on the origin and descent of farm animals.

== Works ==
Partial list

- 1917 Contribution à l'étude des Chiroptères des terrains tertiaires (1ère partie).Mémoires de la Société Paléontologique Suisse, vol. 43, p. 1-60.
- 1919 L'état actuel de nos connaissances sur les Chiroptères fossiles (Note préliminaire) Compte Rendu des Séances de la Société de Physique et d'Histoire naturelle de Genève, vol. 36, n° 3, p. 93-96.
- 1920 Contribution à l'étude des Chiroptères des terrains tertiaires (2ème partie).Mémoires de la Société Paléontologique Suisse, vol. 44, p. 61-130.
- 1922 Contribution à l'étude des Chiroptères des terrains tertiaires (3ème partie et fin).Mémoires de la Société Paléontologique Suisse, vol. 45, p. 131-195.
- 1926. Sur les animaux domestiques de la station de I'epoque de La Tene de Geneve et sur le boeuf brachycephale de l'epoque Romaine. Arch. Sci. Phys.Phys. nat., vol. VIII, pp. 65–74.
- 1946 with Emile Dottrens La faune néolithique de la couche profonde de Saint-Aubin, Révue Suisse de Zoologie, tome 53, n. 33, Genève, pp. 739–775.
