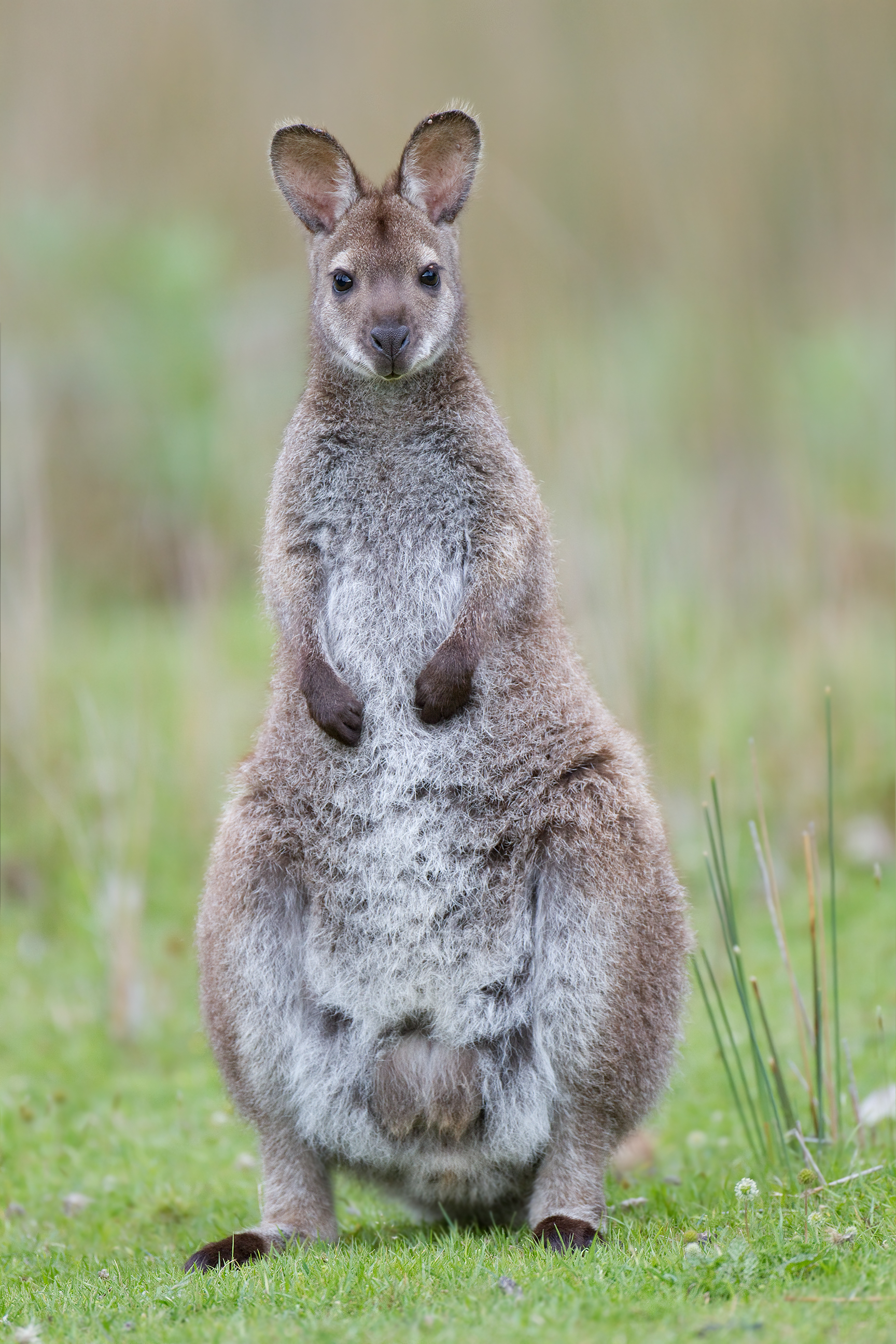
- Red-necked wallaby

Scientific classification
- Kingdom: Animalia
- Phylum: Chordata
- Class: Mammalia
- Infraclass: Marsupialia
- Order: Diprotodontia
- Suborder: Macropodiformes; Ameghino, 1889

Superfamilies
- Macropodoidea: †Balbaridae; Hypsiprymnodontidae; Macropodidae; Potoroidae

= Macropodiformes =

Macropods Temporal range: Late Oligocene–Recent

Suborder of marsupials

The Macropodiformes (/mækroʊˈpɒdɪfɔːrmiːz/), also known as macropods, are one of the three suborders of the large marsupial order Diprotodontia. They may in fact be nested within one of the suborders, Phalangeriformes. Kangaroos, wallabies and allies, bettongs, potoroos and rat kangaroos are all members of this suborder.

== Classification ==
- - Macropodoidea
    - †Balbaridae (basal quadrupedal kangaroos)
      - †Galanarla
      - †Nambaroo
      - †Wururoo
      - †Ganawamaya
      - †Balbaroo
    - Hypsiprymnodontidae (musky rat-kangaroo)
      - Hypsiprymnodontinae
        - Hypsiprymnodon
          - Hypsiprymnodon moschatus (musky rat-kangaroo)
          - †Hypsiprymnodon bartholomaii
          - †Hypsiprymnodon philcreaseri
          - †Hypsiprymnodon dennisi
          - †Hypsiprymnodon karenblackae
      - †Propleopinae
        - †Ekaltadeta
          - †Ekaltadelta ima
          - †Ekaltadelta jamiemulveneyi
        - †Propleopus
          - †Propleopus oscillans
          - †Propleopus chillagoensis
          - †Propleopus wellingtonensis
        - †Jackmahoneyi
          - †Jackmahoneyi toxoniensis
    - Potoroidae (bettongs, potoroos, rat-kangaroos)
      - †Wakiewakie
      - †Purtia
      - ?†Palaeopotorous
      - †Gumardee
      - †Milliyowi
      - †Ngamaroo
      - Potoroinae
        - Aepyprymnus
          - Aepyprymnus rufescens (rufous bettong)
        - Bettongia
          - Bettongia gaimardi (eastern bettong)
          - Bettongia lesueur (boodie)
          - Bettongia pencillata (woylie)
          - Bettongia tropica (northern bettong)
          - †Bettongia moyesi
        - †Caloprymnus
          - †Caloprymnus campestris (desert rat-kangaroo)
        - Potorous
          - Potorous longipes (long-footed potoroo)
          - †Potorous platyops (broad-faced potoroo)
          - Potorous tridactylus (long-nosed potoroo)
          - Potorous gilbertii (Gilbert's potoroo)
    - Macropodidae (kangaroos, wallabies, and allies)
      - †Wabularoo
      - †Bulungamaya
      - †Ganguroo
      - †Cookeroo
      - †Watutia
      - Lagostrophinae
        - Lagostrophus
          - Lagostrophus fasciatus (banded hare-wallaby)
        - †Troposodon
      - †Sthenurinae
        - †Wanburoo
        - †Rhizosthenurus
        - †Hadronomas
        - †Sthenurini
          - †Sthenurus
          - †Eosthenurus
        - †Simosthenurini
          - †Archaeosimos
          - †Simosthenurus
          - †Procoptodon
      - Macropodinae
        - †Dorcopsoides
        - †Kurrabi
        - †Prionotemnus
        - †Congruus
        - †Protemnodon
        - †Baringa
        - †Bohra
        - †Synaptodon
        - †Fissuridon
        - †Silvaroo
        - Dendrolagus (tree‑kangaroos)
          - Dendrolagus inustus (grizzled tree-kangaroo)
          - Dendrolagus lumholtzi (Lumholtz's tree-kangaroo)
          - Dendrolagus bennettianus (Bennett's tree-kangaroo)
          - Dendrolagus ursinus (ursine tree-kangaroo)
          - Dendrolagus matschiei (Matschie's tree-kangaroo)
          - Dendrolagus dorianus (Doria's tree-kangaroo)
          - Dendrolagus notatus (ifola)
          - Dendrolagus stellarum (Seri's tree-kangaroo)
          - Dendrolagus goodfellowi (Goodfellow's tree-kangaroo)
          - Dendrolagus pulcherrimus (golden-mantled tree-kangaroo)
          - Dendrolagus spadix (lowlands tree-kangaroo)
          - Dendrolagus mbaiso (dingiso)
          - Dendrolagus scottae (tenkile)
          - Dendrolagus mayri (Wondiwoi tree-kangaroo)
        - Dorcopsis
          - Dorcopsis atrata (black dorcopsis)
          - Dorcopsis hageni (white-striped dorcopsis)
          - Dorcopsis luctuosa (gray dorcopsis)
          - Dorcopsis muelleri (brown dorcopsis)
        - Dorcopsulus
          - Dorcopsulus macleayi (Macleay's dorcopsis)
          - Dorcopulus vanheurni (small dorcopsis)
        - Lagorchestes (hare‑wallabies)
          - Lagorchestes conspicillatus (spectacled hare-wallaby)
          - Lagorchestes hirsutus (rufous hare-wallaby)
          - Lagorchestes asomatus (Lake Mackay hare-wallaby)
          - Lagorchestes leporides (eastern hare-wallaby)
        - - Macropus (grey kangaroos)
            - Macropus giganteus (eastern grey kangaroo)
            - Macropus fuliginosus (western grey kangaroo)
          - Osphranter (red kangaroo, antilopine kangaroo, & wallaroos)
            - Osphranter rufus (red kangaroo)
            - Osphranter antilopinus (antilopine kangaroo)
            - Osphranter bernardus (black wallaroo)
            - Osphranter robustus (common wallaroo)
          - Notamacropus (wallabies)
            - Notamacropus agilis (agile wallaby)
            - Notamacropus dorsalis (black-striped wallaby)
            - Notamacropus parma (parma wallaby)
            - Notamacropus rufogriseus (red-necked wallaby)
            - Notamacropus eugenii (tammar wallaby)
            - Notamacropus irma (western brush wallaby)
            - Notamacropus parryi (whiptail wallaby)
            - †Notamacropus greyi (toolache wallaby)
        - Onychogalea (nail‑tail wallabies)
          - Onychogalea fraenata (bridled nail-tail wallaby)
          - †Onychogalea lunata (crescent nail-tail wallaby)
          - Onychogalea unguifera (northern nail-tail wallaby)
        - Petrogale (rock‑wallabies)
          - Petrogale brachyotis (short-eared rock-wallaby)
          - Petrogale burbidgei (monjon)
          - Petrogale concinna (nabarlek)
          - Petrogale wilkinsi (eastern short-eared rock-wallaby)
          - Petrogale persephone (Proserpine rock-wallaby)
          - Petrogale rothschildi (Rothschild's rock-wallaby)
          - Petrogale xanthopus (yellow-footed rock-wallaby)
          - Petrogale assimilis (allied rock-wallaby)
          - Petrogale coenensis (Cape York rock-wallaby)
          - Petrogale godmani (Godman's rock-wallaby)
          - Petrogale herberti (Herbert's rock-wallaby)
          - Petrogale inornata (unadorned rock-wallaby)
          - Petrogale lateralis (black-flanked rock-wallaby)
          - Petrogale mareeba (Mareeba rock-wallaby)
          - Petrogale penicillata (brush-tailed rock-wallaby)
          - Petrogale purpureicollis (purple-necked rock-wallaby)
          - Petrogale sharmani (Mount Claro rock-wallaby)
        - Setonix
          - Setonix brachyurus (quokka)
        - Thylogale (pademelons)
          - Thylogale billardierii (Tasmanian pademelon/red-bellied pademelon)
          - Thylogale browni (Brown's pademelon)
          - Thylogale brunii (dusky pademelon)
          - Thylogale calabyi (Calaby's pademelon)
          - Thylogale lanatus (mountain pademelon)
          - Thylogale stigmatica (red-legged pademelon)
          - Thylogale thetis (red-necked pademelon)
        - Wallabia
          - Wallabia bicolor (swamp wallaby)

- Superfamily Macropodoidea
  - Family †Balbaridae: (basal quadrupedal kangaroos)
    - Genus †Galanarla
    - Genus †Nambaroo
    - Genus †Wururoo
    - Genus †Ganawamaya
    - Genus †Balbaroo
  - Family Hypsiprymnodontidae: (musky rat-kangaroo)
    - Subfamily Hypsiprymnodontinae
      - Genus Hypsiprymnodon
        - Musky rat-kangaroo, Hypsiprymnodon moschatus
        - †Hypsiprymnodon bartholomaii
        - †Hypsiprymnodon philcreaseri
        - †Hypsiprymnodon dennisi
        - †Hypsiprymnodon karenblackae
    - Subfamily †Propleopinae
      - Genus †Ekaltadeta
        - †Ekaltadeta ima
        - †Ekaltadeta jamiemulveneyi
      - Genus †Propleopus
        - †Propleopus oscillans
        - †Propleopus chillagoensis
        - †Propleopus wellingtonensis
      - Genus †Jackmahoneyi
        - †Jackmahoneyi toxoniensis
  - Family Potoroidae: (bettongs, potoroos, and rat-kangaroos)
    - Genus †Wakiewakie
    - Genus †Purtia
    - Genus ?†Palaeopotorous
    - Genus †Gumardee
    - Genus †Milliyowi
    - Genus †Ngamaroo
    - Subfamily Potoroinae
      - Genus Aepyprymnus
        - Rufous rat-kangaroo, Aepyprymnus rufescens
      - Genus Bettongia
        - Eastern bettong, Bettongia gaimardi
        - Boodie, Bettongia lesueur
        - Woylie, Bettongia penicillata
        - Northern bettong, Bettongia tropica
        - †Bettongia moyesi
      - Genus †Caloprymnus
        - †Desert rat-kangaroo, Caloprymnus campestris
      - Genus Potorous
        - Long-footed potoroo, Potorous longipes
        - †Broad-faced potoroo, Potorous platyops
        - Long-nosed potoroo, Potorous tridactylus
        - Gilbert's potoroo, Potorous gilbertii
  - Family Macropodidae: (kangaroos, wallabies and allies)
    - Genus †Wabularoo
    - Genus †Bulungamaya
    - Genus †Ganguroo
    - Genus †Cookeroo
    - Genus †Watutia
  - Subfamily Lagostrophinae
    - Genus Lagostrophus
      - Banded hare-wallaby, Lagostrophus fasciatus
    - Genus †Troposodon
  - Subfamily †Sthenurinae
    - Genus †Wanburoo
    - Genus †Rhizosthenurus
    - Genus †Hadronomas
    - Tribe †Sthenurini
      - Genus †Sthenurus
      - Genus †Eosthenurus
    - Genus †Metasthenurus
    - Tribe †Simosthenurini
      - Genus †Archaeosimos
      - Genus †Simosthenurus
      - Genus †Procoptodon
  - Subfamily Macropodinae
    - Genus †Baringa
    - Genus †Bohra
    - Genus †Congruus
    - Genus †Dorcopsoides
    - Genus †Fissuridon
    - Genus †Kurrabi
    - Genus †Prionotemnus
    - Genus †Protemnodon
    - Genus †Silvaroo
    - Genus †Synaptodon
    - Genus Dendrolagus: tree-kangaroos
    - Genus Dorcopsis: forest wallabies
    - Genus Dorcopsulus
    - Genus Lagorchestes: hare-wallabies
    - Genus Macropus
    - Genus Notamacropus
    - Genus Onychogalea
    - Genus Osphranter
    - Genus Petrogale: rock-wallabies
    - Genus Setonix
    - Genus Thylogale
    - Genus Wallabia
