= Galanarla =

Galanarla Temporal range: Late Oligocene

Scientific classification
- Kingdom: Animalia
- Phylum: Chordata
- Class: Mammalia
- Infraclass: Marsupialia
- Order: Diprotodontia
- Family: †Balbaridae
- Genus: †Galanarla; Flannery et al., 1982

Type species
- †Galanarla tessellata Flannery et al., 1982

Extinct genus of marsupials

Galanarla is an extinct and potentially dubious genus of balbarid macropod that inhabited northeastern Australia during the Late Oligocene. The genus contains a single species, Galanarla tessellata, which is known only from a dentary collected at the Riversleigh World Heritage Area in Queensland.

== Discovery and naming ==
The holotype specimen of Galanarla, QM F10644, was discovered in the Late Oligocene-aged D-Site of the Riversleigh World Heritage Area, in the Boodjamulla National Park, north-western Queensland. The specimen consists of a partial left dentary, preserving the roots and base of the first lower incisor, the roots of the third lower premolar and first lower molar, and partial or complete second, third and fourth lower molars. Numerous premaxillary fragments and isolated teeth have also been referred to this taxon. However, a study published in 2018 by Butler and colleagues restricted Galanarla to just the holotype.

In 1982, Tim Flannery, Michael Archer and Michael Plane described Galanarla tessellata as a new genus and species of macropod. The generic epithet, Galanarla, is a combination of the Waanyi words "gala", meaning river, and "narlee", meaning rock wallaby. The name was chosen in reference to the fluviatile deposit it was found in and that its fossils represent a wallaby now turned to rock. The specific epithet, tessellata, is derived from the Latin word for "mosaic", referring to the mosaic nature of traits exhibited by this taxon.

== Description ==
The holotype dentary of Galanarla has a straight ventral margin. In contrast, it is convex in bulungamayines. The opening for the masseteric canal is much smaller than that of Wabularoo and Bulungamaya. An 18.7 mm long (0.74 in) gap, or diastema, occurs between the lower first incisor and lower third premolar. A mental foramina is present in front of and slightly ventral to the premolar. The molar row curves outwards and towards the cheek, while the premolar is flexed buccally out of alignment with the molar row. The mandibular symphysis is long and ends below the back root of the premolar. The root of the incisor has a cylindrical shape and is robust. A dorsal enamel flange is present on the crown of the tooth. The molars are low-crowned and lophodont, meaning they have transverse enamel ridges. Both the second and fourth lower molars possesses a posterior cingulum, while the third lower molar has a low anterior cingulum.

== Classification ==
When first described in 1982, Flannery and colleagues classified Galanarla as a member of the family Macropodidae. Its exact placement within the clade, however, could not be determined by the authors as it shared affinities with the subfamilies Macropodinae and Balbarinae. Seven years later, however, Flannery would put it within Macropodinae. In 1997, Cooke reassigned Galanarla to Balbarinae on the basis of its lower molars possessing a well-developed posterior cingulid linked to a postentocristid. Kear & Cooke (2001) agreed with this placement, but elevated Balbarinae to the family level. In 2018, due to the poor preservation of the holotype specimen, Galanarla was considered likely to be a nomen dubium.

== Paleobiology ==
=== Paleoenvironment ===
The fossils remains of Galanarla were recovered from the D-Site, located on the D-Site Plateau, within the Riversleigh World Heritage Area. It is thought to have been deposited in either a temperate open forest or woodland environment. Plant remains from the similarly aged Dunsinane Site at Riversleigh show that the vegetation at the time was dominated by she-oak (Casuarinaceae) trees or shrubs. Pockets of rainforest may also have been present, specifically around pools or along watercourses, as indicated by fossils of a Burdekin plum relative from the same site as the other plant remains. Many additional macropods have been described from the D-Site include the basal macropodids Bulungamaya delicata and Gumardee pascuali, as well as the probable sthenurine Wabularoo naughtoni.

Other animals that lived alongside Galanarla include the thylacinid Nimbacinus dicksoni; the palorchestid Propalorchestes ponticulus; and the diprotodontids Ngapakaldia bonythoni, Silvabestius sp. and Neohelos tirarensis.

=== Paleoecology ===
A study published in 2016 by Janis and colleagues found Galanarla to be a mixed feeder, being able to both graze and browse, using craniodental measurements.
