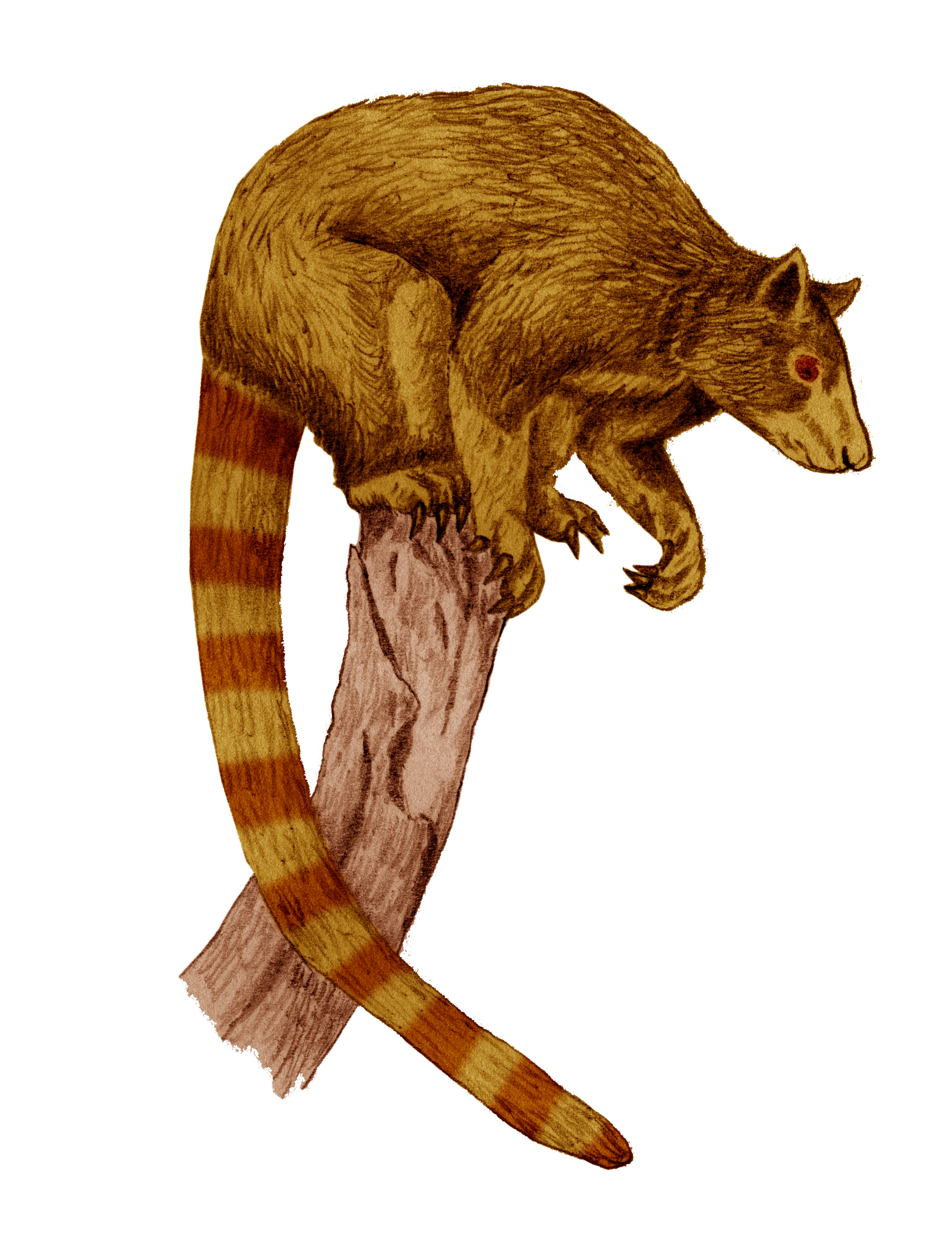

Scientific classification
- Kingdom: Animalia
- Phylum: Chordata
- Class: Mammalia
- Infraclass: Marsupialia
- Order: Diprotodontia
- Family: Macropodidae
- Subfamily: Macropodinae
- Genus: †Bohra; Flannery & Szalay, 1982

Type species
- †Bohra paulae Flannery & Szalay, 1982

Other species
- †B. bandharr Dawson, Muirhead & Wroe, 1999; †B. bila Dawson, 2004b; †B. illuminata Prideaux & Warburton, 2008; †B. nullarbora Prideaux & Warburton, 2009; †B. planei Prideaux & Warburton, 2023; †B. wilkinsonorum Dawson, 2004a

Synonyms
- Protemnodon bandharr Dawson, Muirhead & Wroe, 1999; Silvaroo bandharr Dawson, 2004b; Silvaroo bila Dawson, 2004b

= Bohra (mammal) =

Bohra Temporal range: Pliocene–Late Pleistocene

Extinct genus of marsupials

Bohra is an extinct genus of macropod from the Plio-Pleistocene of Australia. It is closely related to modern tree kangaroos (Dendrolagus), and like them is thought to have had an arboreal lifestyle, with some species of Bohra substantially exceeding living tree kangaroos in size.

== Taxonomy ==
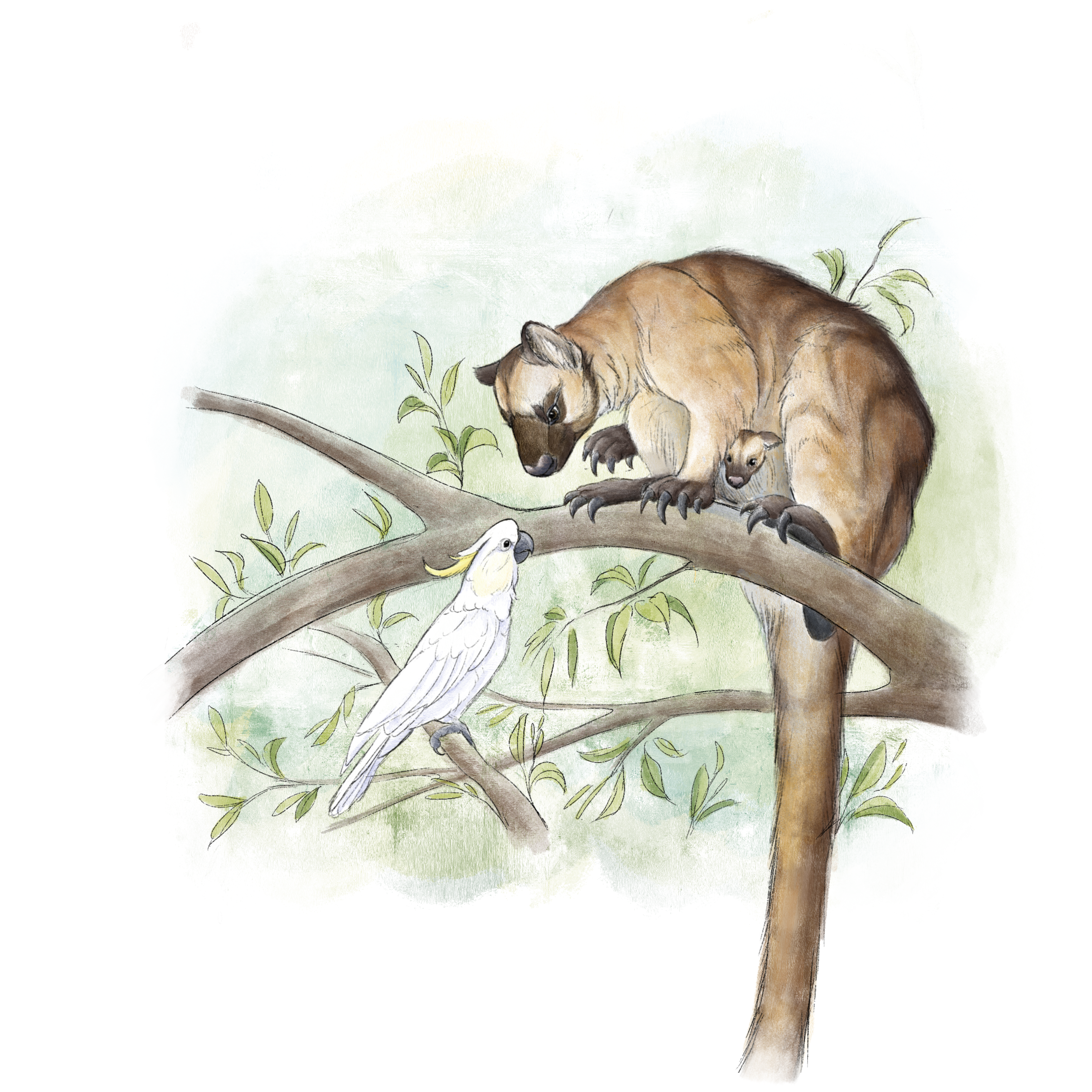
Life restoration of B. paulae

The type species, Bohra paulae was first described in 1982 from material found in Wellington Caves in New South Wales. Bohra is the name of a legendary kangaroo of the Euahlayi tribe from New South Wales. Bohra was said to walk on all four limbs and possessed sharp canine teeth before being removed by men. Living tree-kangaroos share similar proportions between the front and hind limbs.

Three other species have been described: Bohra wilkinsonorum from southeastern Queensland in 2004, Bohra illuminata from south-central Australia in 2008, and Bohra nullarbora from Western Australia in 2009.

Bohra is considered a plesiomorphic sister taxon to the living tree-kangaroos (Dendrolagus).

== Description ==
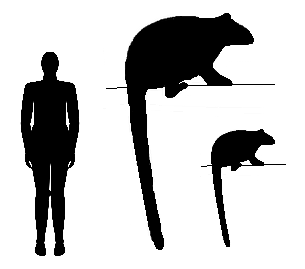
Size of B. paulae compared to 180 cm man and Dendrolagus goodfellowi

Some species of Bohra like Bohra paula and Bohra wilkinsonorum were much larger than any tree-kangaroo, with estimated body masses of 35–47 kg (77–104 lb). They many similarities with tree-kangaroos in their cranio-dental and hind limb morphology, and in spite of its size, shows many of the same arboreal adaptations as its living relatives. Among the similarities are the calcaneus being flat and broad with the cuboid articulation not being stepped and the height-to-width ratio of the articulation being much smaller than in that of other types of kangaroos. Compared to living tree kangaroos, the species of Bohra are distinguished by proportionally larger cheek teeth and longer upper incisors.

Remains of Bohra illuminata also show morphological similarities to rock wallabies (Petrogale); recent molecular studies suggest that rock wallabies are the closest living relatives of tree-kangaroos, further proving Bohra is of close relation to these groups.

== Distribution and habitat ==
Bohra wilkinsonorum is the oldest species (Pliocene), while the remaining species are of Pleistocene age. All species of Bohra inhabited regions more southerly than any tree-kangaroo, including the now treeless Nullarbor Plain. Given the arboreal nature of Bohra, it seems many regions of Australia were able to better support tree cover in the recent past. The youngest records of Bohra dates to around the Late Pleistocene, though the precise timing of extinction is uncertain due to a lack of precise dating on remains, though they may have persisted as recently as 22,000 years ago based on Dendrolagus-like DNA found in indeterminate bone fragments from Tunnel Cave in Southwestern Australia.
