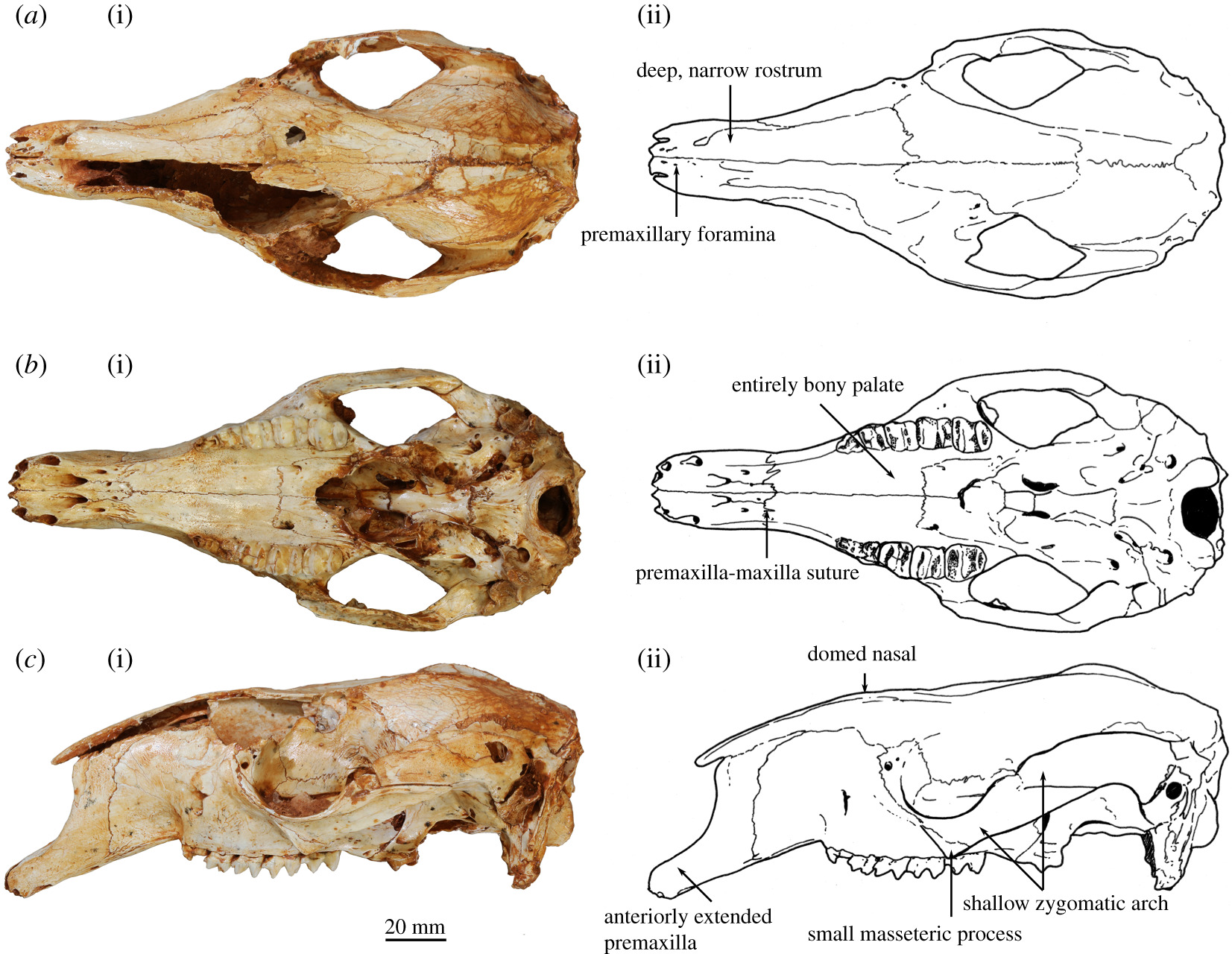
- Skull of Congruus kitcheneri

Scientific classification
- Kingdom: Animalia
- Phylum: Chordata
- Class: Mammalia
- Infraclass: Marsupialia
- Order: Diprotodontia
- Family: Macropodidae
- Subfamily: Macropodinae
- Genus: †Congruus; McNamara, 1994

Species
- Congruus congruus McNamara, 1994 (type); Congruus kitcheneri (Flannery. 1989)

= Congruus =

Congruus Temporal range: Late Pleistocene

Extinct genus of macropod

Congruus is an extinct genus of macropod known from the Late Pleistocene of Australia. There are two species, Congruus kitcheneri, which was originally described as a species of Wallabia, and Congruus congruus. Specimens are known from Mammoth Cave, Western Australia, the Thylacoleo Caves (Nullarbor Plain) and the Naracoorte caves in South Australia. Potential material is also known from Eastern Australia. The morphology of the skull and limbs suggests that they were semi-arboreal browsers, moving slowly through trees, though they were larger than and not as specialised for climbing as living tree kangaroos. They are thought to be members of the tribe Macropodini, and close relatives of the extinct genus Protemnodon.
