= Nombe =

Nombe Temporal range: Late Pleistocene

Scientific classification
- Kingdom: Animalia
- Phylum: Chordata
- Class: Mammalia
- Infraclass: Marsupialia
- Order: Diprotodontia
- Family: Macropodidae
- Genus: †Nombe; Kerr & Prideaux, 2022
- Species: †N. nombe

Binomial name
- †Nombe nombe (Flannery, Mountain, & Aplin, 1983)

Synonyms
- Protemnodon nombe

Extinct genus of macropodid

Nombe is an extinct genus of macropodid containing a single species, Nombe nombe, which was formerly classified as a member of the genus Protemnodon. It was native to New Guinea during the Late Pleistocene. It was relatively large in body size and is thought to have been a browser. Phylogenetic analysis suggests that it is a basal member of the subfamily Macropodinae.
