= Dorcopsoides =

Dorcopsoides Temporal range: Late Miocene–Late Pliocene

Scientific classification
- Kingdom: Animalia
- Phylum: Chordata
- Class: Mammalia
- Infraclass: Marsupialia
- Order: Diprotodontia
- Family: Macropodidae
- Genus: †Dorcopsoides; Woodburne, 1967

Type species
- †Dorcopsoides fossilis Woodburne, 1967

Other species
- †D. buloloensis (Plane, 1967); †D. cowpatensis Kerr & Prideaux, 2025

Synonyms
- Protemnodon buloloensis Plane, 1967; Silvaroo buloloensis Dawson, 2004

Extinct genus of marsupials

Dorcopsoides is a genus of extinct kangaroo from the Late Miocene of Australia and Late Pliocene of Papua New Guinea.

== Description ==
The genus Dorcopsoides was described in 1967 from a well-preserved lower jaw, skull fragments, and occipital found in the Upper Miocene Alcoota Fossil Beds north-east of Alice Springs in the Northern Territory. It was part of the Alcoota local fauna, which also included zygomaturine diprotodonts, a type of mihirung (Ilbandornis), a crocodile (Baru) and the giant thylacine, Thylacinus potens.

It was about the size of a gray and black four-eyed opossum. The generic name, Dorcopsoides, indicates a resemblance to forest wallabies (Dorcopsis) now living in New Guinea and neighboring islands.
