= Watutia =

Watutia Temporal range: Pliocene

Scientific classification
- Kingdom: Animalia
- Phylum: Chordata
- Class: Mammalia
- Infraclass: Marsupialia
- Order: Diprotodontia
- Family: Macropodidae
- Genus: †Watutia; Flannery, Hoch & Aplin, 1989
- Species: †W. novaeguinae

Binomial name
- †Watutia novaeguinae Flannery, Hoch & Aplin, 1989

Extinct genus of marsupials

Watutia is an extinct genus of fossil kangaroo known from the Pliocene from New Guinea. It is only known from the type species Watutia novaeguineae, known from some fragmentary upper and lower jaws and isolated teeth from the Pliocene Otibanda Formation in the Morobe Province of Papua New Guinea. The closest relative of the genus was possibly Hadronomas, who lived in today's Queensland a few million years earlier. W. novaeguineae was about the size of a large shrub wallaby (Dorcopsis) and differs in some characteristics from the teeth of other kangaroos. The molars were low and the first premolars elongated. Cristids obliqua and posterior cingula are missing on the lower molars. The feature that defines the close association with Hadronomas was the upper first premolar, which was more bulbous with no lingual cingulum, differing it from most Macropods.
