= Propleopus chillagoensis =

Scientific classification
- Kingdom: Animalia
- Phylum: Chordata
- Class: Mammalia
- Infraclass: Marsupialia
- Order: Diprotodontia
- Family: Hypsiprymnodontidae
- Genus: †Propleopus
- Species: †P. chillagoensis

Binomial name
- †Propleopus chillagoensis Archer et al., 1978

Extinct species of marsupial

Propleopus chillagoensis is an extinct species of marsupial, of the genus Propleopus. It was found in new North Queensland, and is related to the musky rat-kangaroo. Propleopus chillagoensis was likely omnivorous.
