= Cookeroo =

Cookeroo Temporal range: 23–18 Ma Late Oligocene - Early Miocene

Scientific classification
- Kingdom: Animalia
- Phylum: Chordata
- Class: Mammalia
- Infraclass: Marsupialia
- Order: Diprotodontia
- Family: Macropodidae
- Genus: †Cookeroo

Species
- C. bulwidarri Butler et al., 2016; C. hortusensis Butler et al., 2016

Extinct genus of marsupials

Cookeroo is a genus of extinct kangaroos from the Late Oligocene and Early Miocene found in fossil deposits from the Riversleigh World Heritage Area, in Australia. The genus includes two species, C. bulwidarri and C. hortusensis.

== Taxonomy ==
The genus was erected to describe two new fossil species of early Macropodidae by researchers, both of which were discovered at Riversleigh and published in 2016. The name of the genus honours the contribution of Bernard Cooke to the study of early marsupials and the evolutionary history of the modern kangaroos and wallabies. The specific epithets of the two known species are named for the sites where they were discovered, bulwidarri adopts a word from the Wanyi language, meaning "white", in reference to the White Hunter site, hortusensis is derived from the Latin for garden, the type locality being Neville's Garden site.

== Description ==
The species are equivalent in size to the smaller wallabies of Australia. Unlike modern macropods, the animals moved on four legs, rather than hopping, in the dense rainforest that dominated the Riversleigh area in the early Miocene. The earliest species, Cookeroo bulwidarri, is dated to around 23 million years, and C. hortusensis to period several million years later. The genus is to have occupied an area that was also inhabited by the balbarids, a family known as fanged kangaroos, which is thought to have become extinct as the climate changed and the rainforest gave way to a more open woodland environment.
