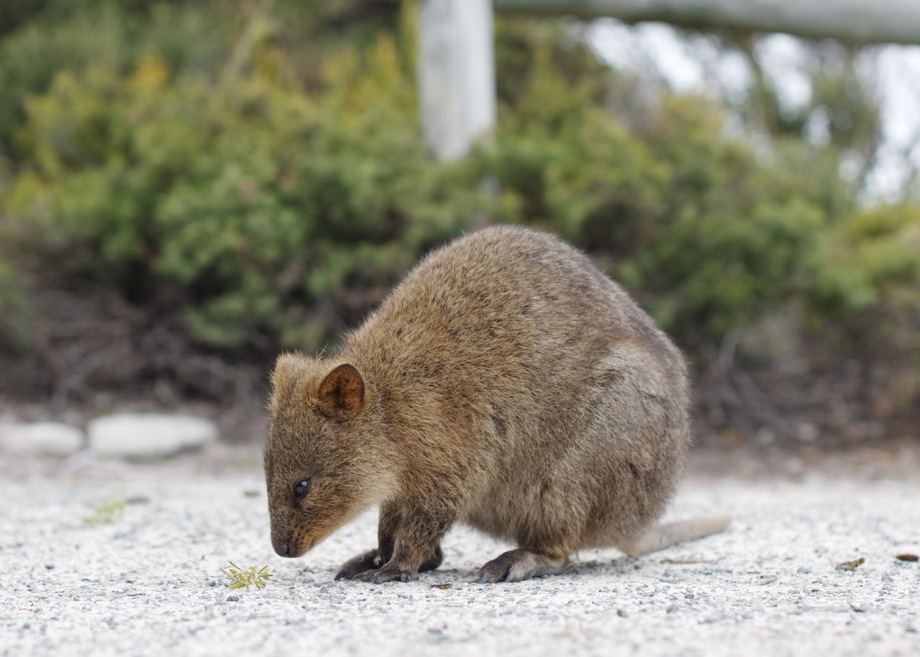
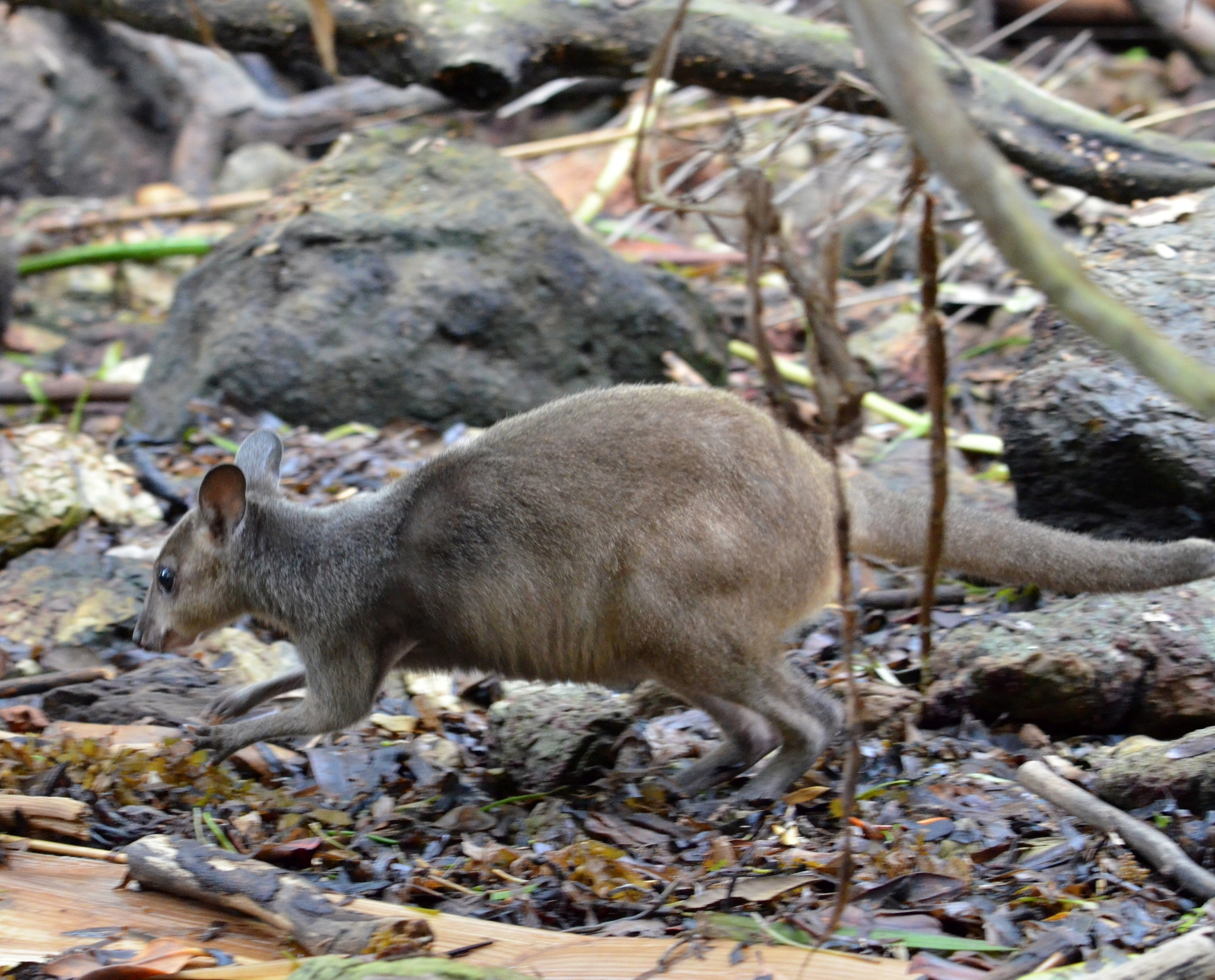
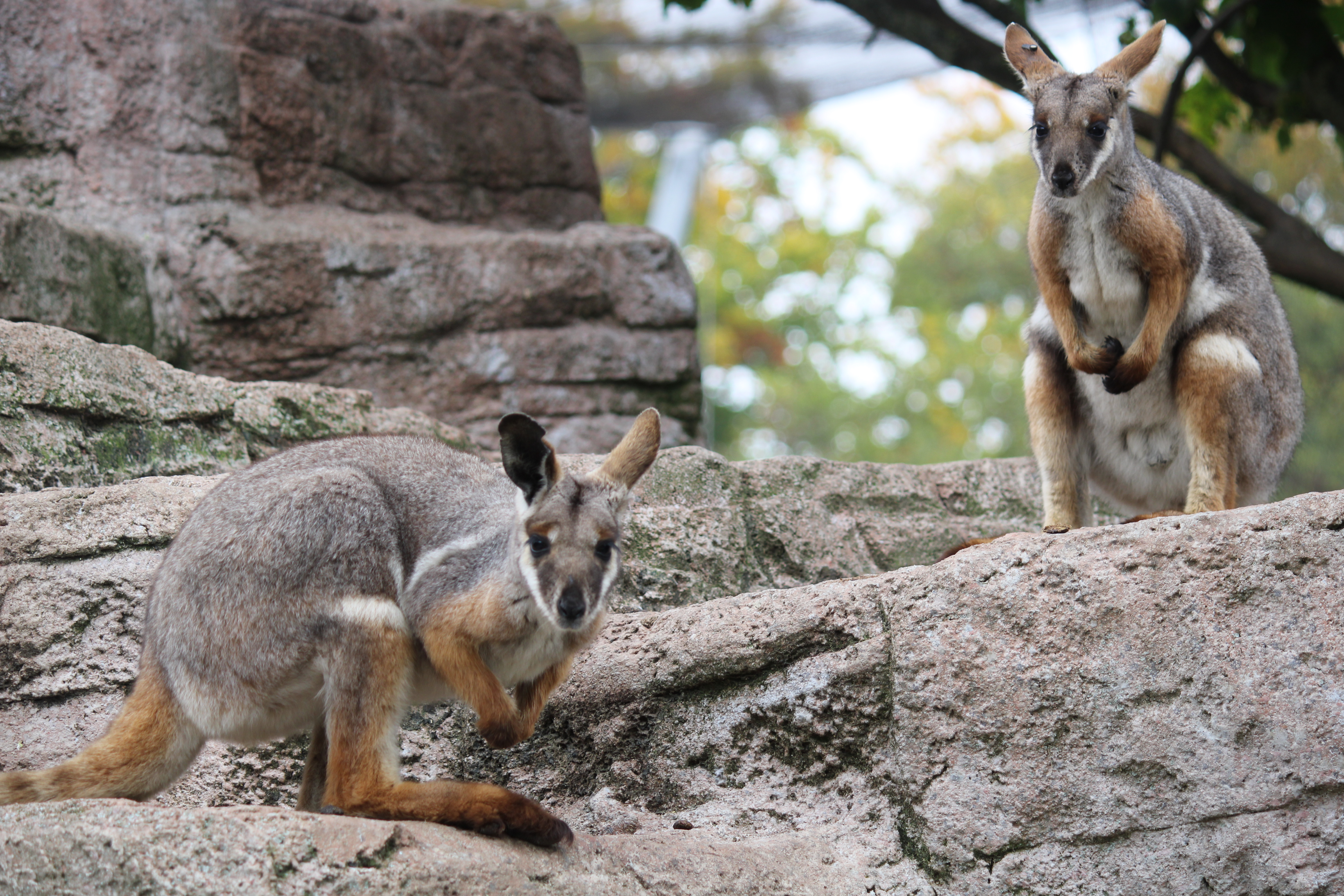
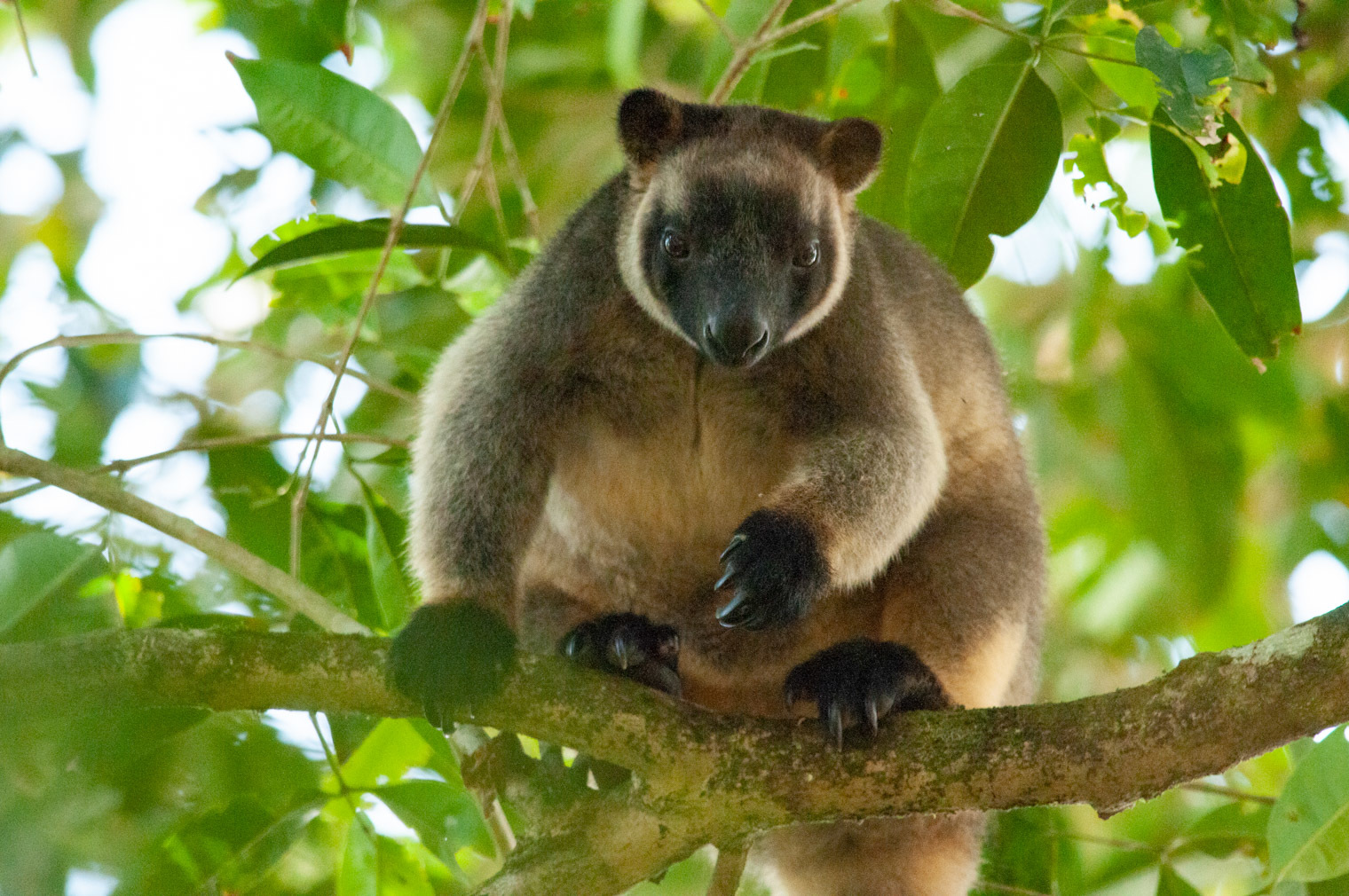
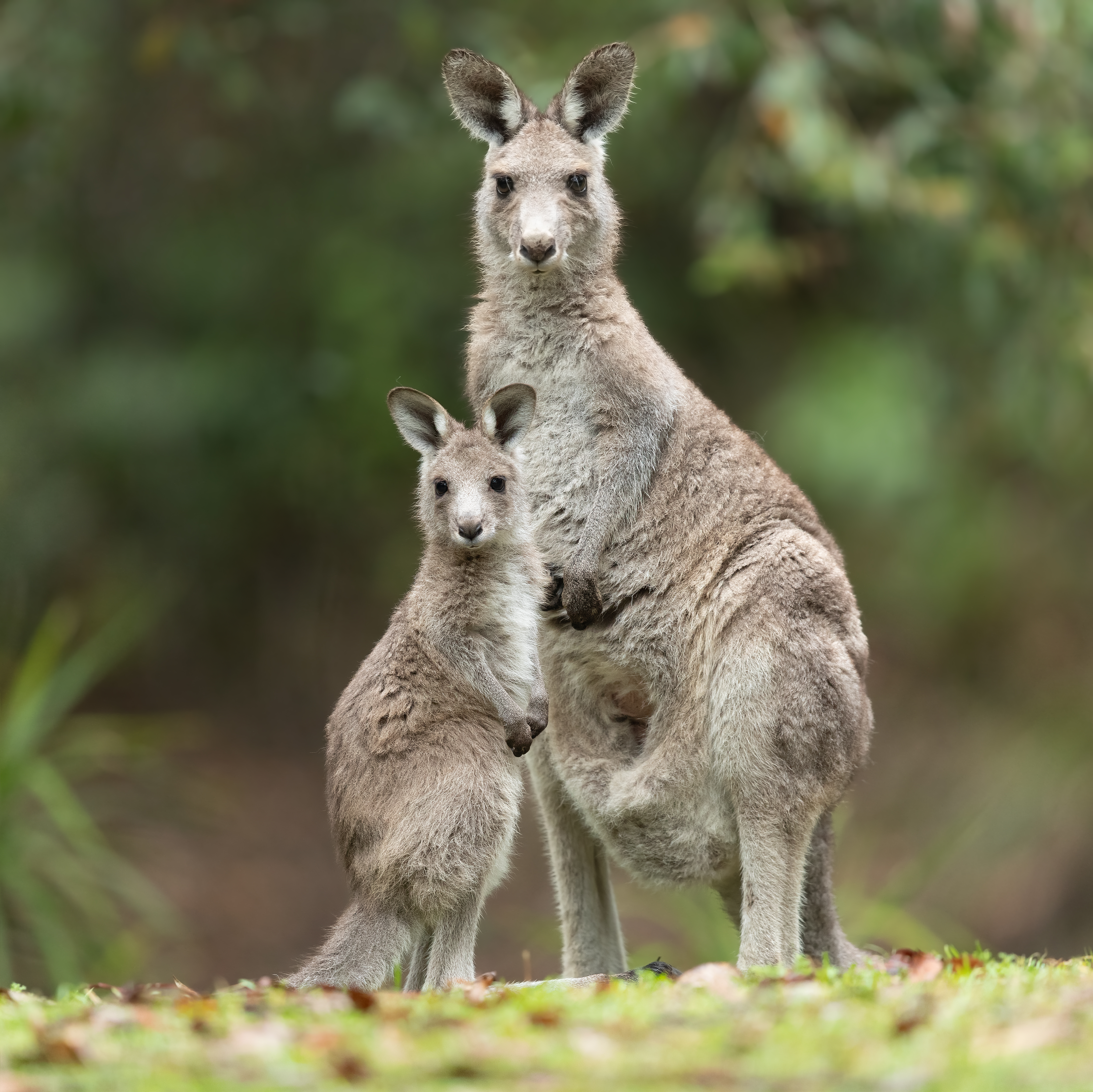
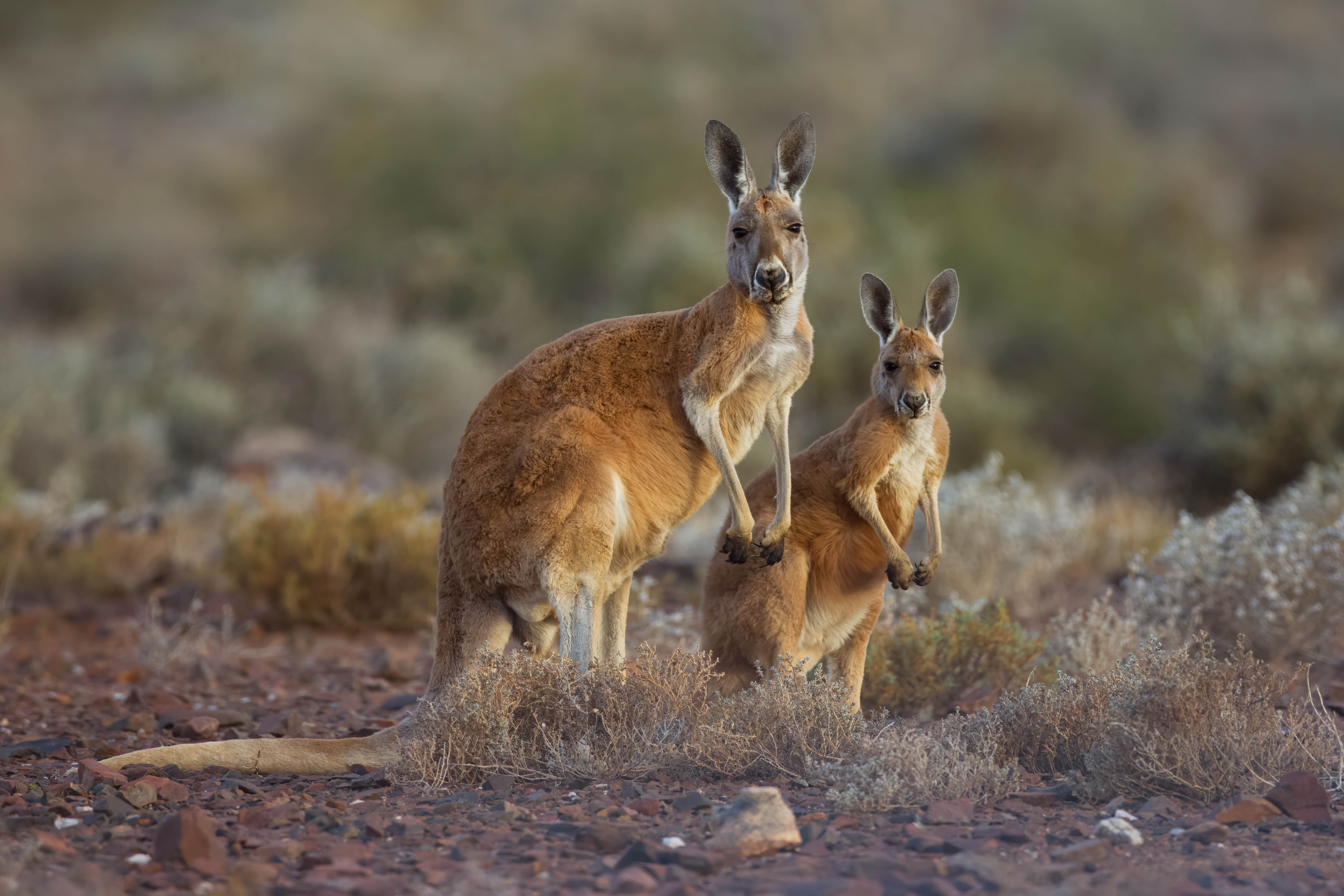
- Clockwise from top-left: Quokka, Gray dorcopsis, Lumholtz's tree-kangaroo, Red kangaroo, Eastern grey kangaroo, and Yellow-footed rock-wallaby

Scientific classification
- Kingdom: Animalia
- Phylum: Chordata
- Class: Mammalia
- Infraclass: Marsupialia
- Order: Diprotodontia
- Family: Macropodidae
- Subfamily: Macropodinae; Gray, 1821

Genera
- Setonix; † Nombe; Dorcopsini Prideaux & Warburton, 2009; Dorcopsis; †Dorcopsoides; Dorcopsulus; †Watutia; Dendrolagini Flannery, 1989; Petrogale; Thylogale; Dendrolagina Prideaux & Warburton, 2023; †Bohra; Dendrolagus; Macropodini Flannery, 1989; †Baringa; †Congruus; †Kurrabi; Lagorchestes; Macropus; Notamacropus; Onychogalea; Osphranter; †Prionotemnus; †Protemnodon; Wallabia

= Macropodinae =

Macropodinae Temporal range: Late Miocene–Present

Subfamily of marsupials

Macropodinae is a subfamily of marsupials in the family Macropodidae, which includes the kangaroos, wallabies, and related species. The subfamily includes about ten genera and at least 51 species. It includes all living members of the Macropodidae except for the banded hare-wallaby (Lagostrophus fasciatus), the only surviving member of the subfamily Lagostrophinae.

Different common names are used for macropodines, including "wallaby" and "kangaroo", with the distinction sometimes based exclusively on size. In addition to the well-known kangaroos, the subfamily includes other specialized groups, such as the arboreal tree-kangaroos (Dendrolagus), which have body masses between 4 and 13 kg, and a relatively long prehensile tail.

== Evolution ==
Measurements of dental macrowear and molar coronal height suggests that macropodins experienced a major evolutionary radiation during the middle of the Pliocene epoch, most likely in response to the substantial grassland expansion occurring then.
