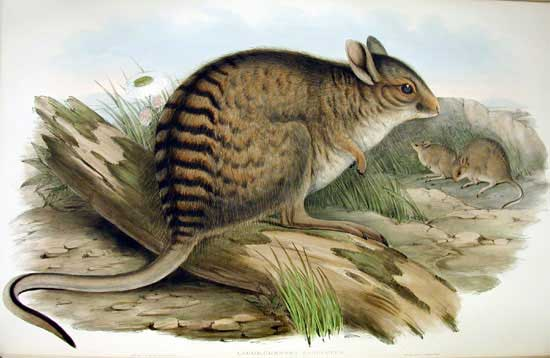
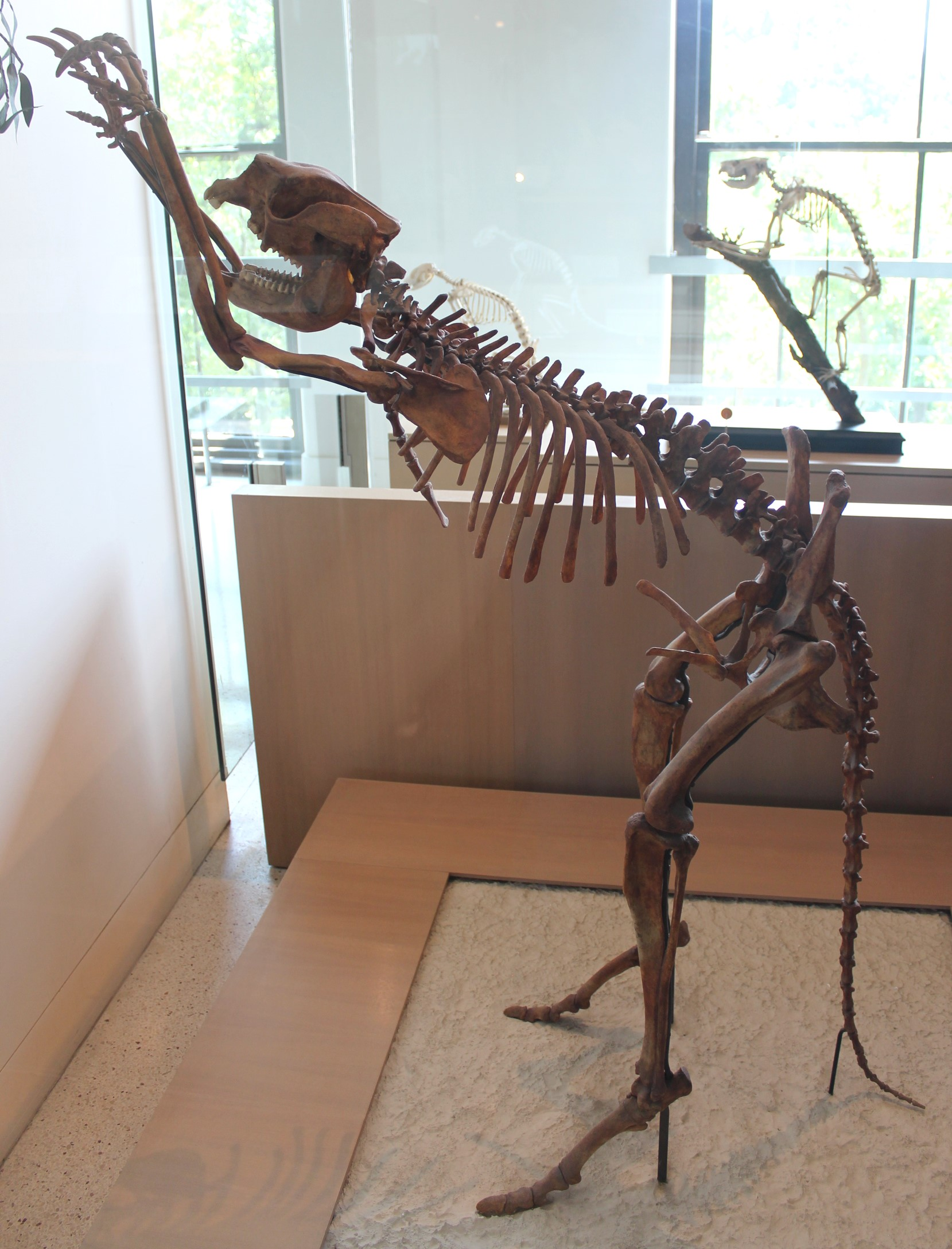
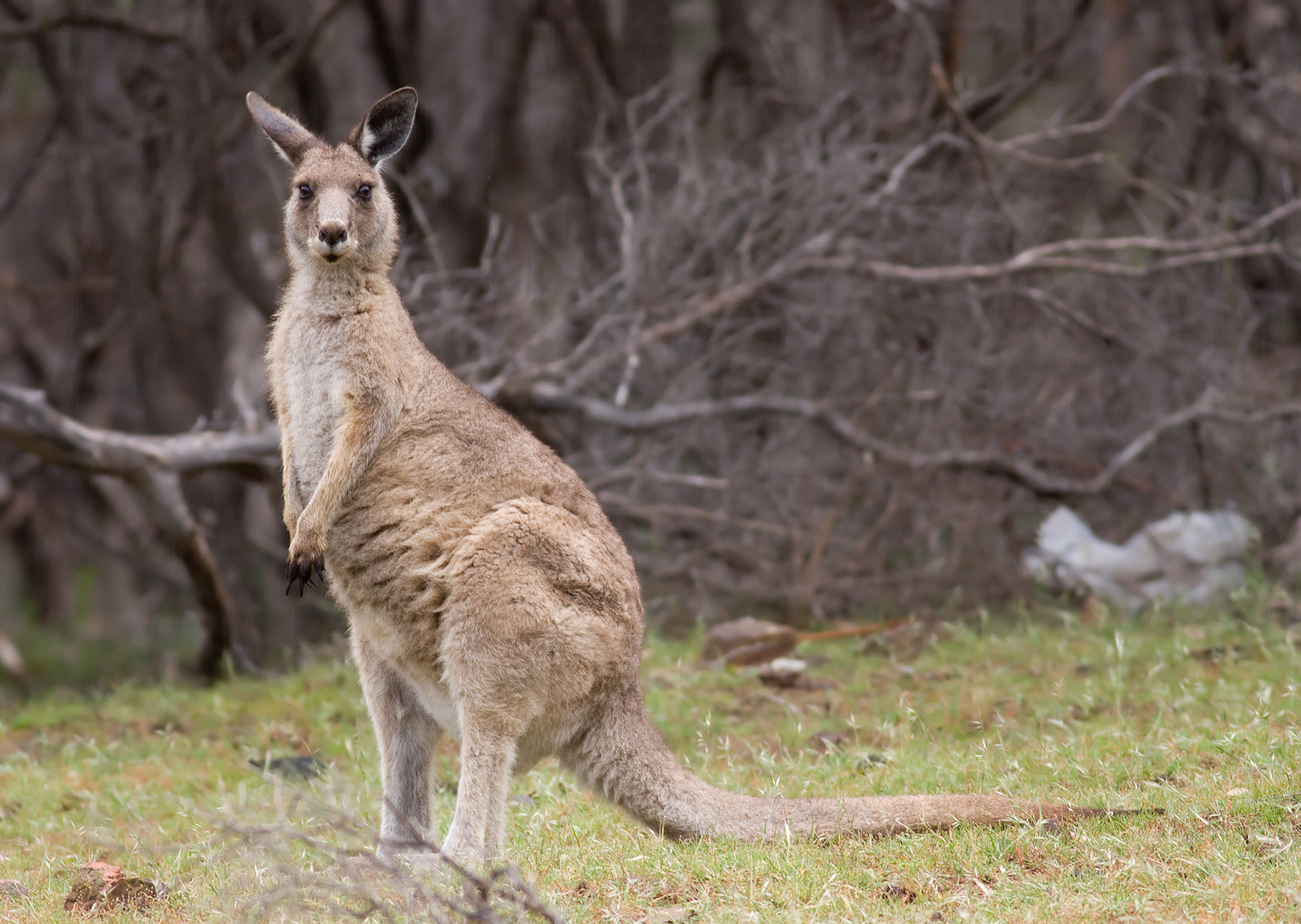
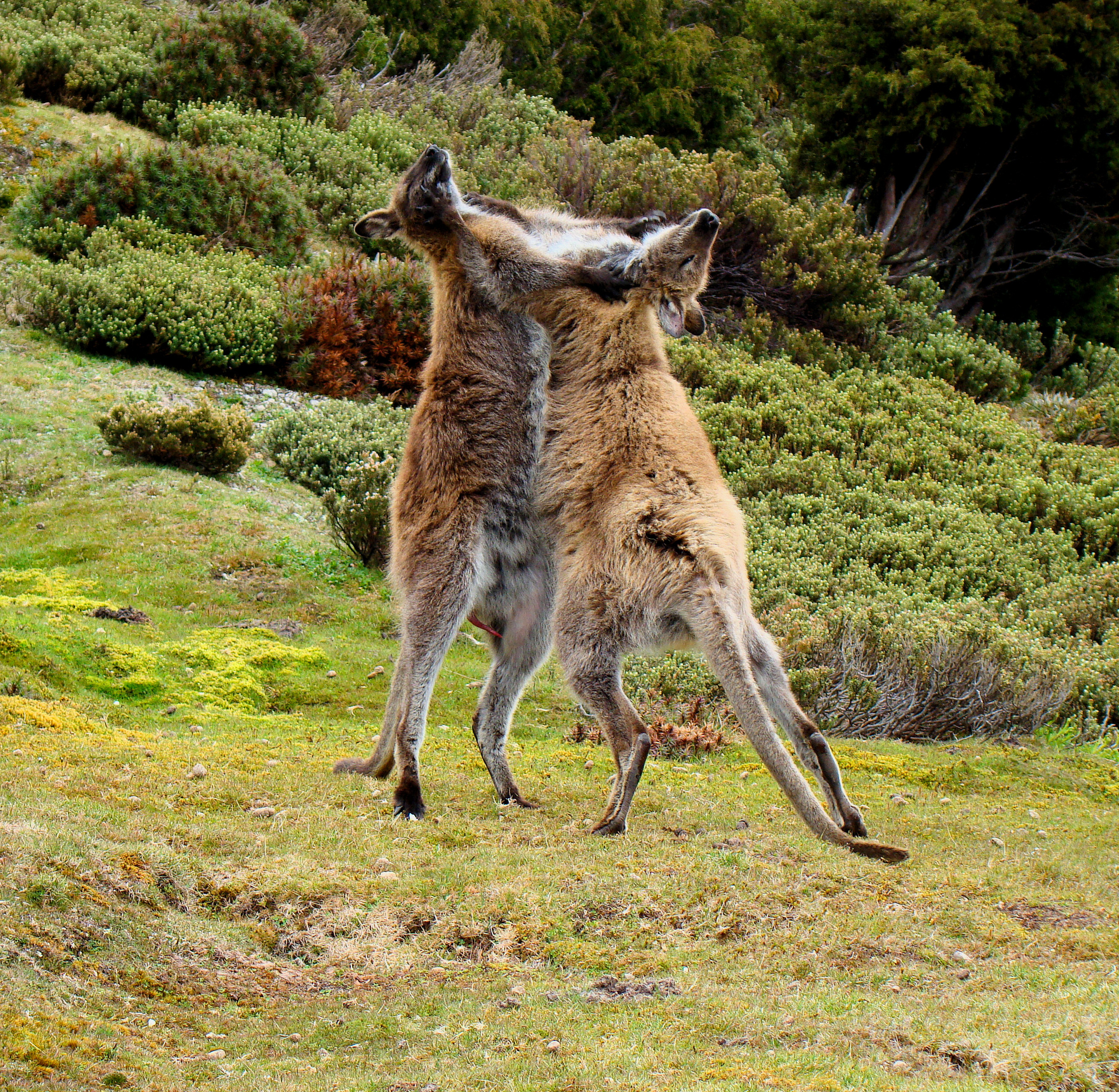
- Clockwise from top-left: Banded hare-wallaby, Simosthenurus, Red-necked wallaby, and Eastern grey kangaroo

Scientific classification
- Kingdom: Animalia
- Phylum: Chordata
- Class: Mammalia
- Infraclass: Marsupialia
- Order: Diprotodontia
- Superfamily: Macropodoidea
- Family: Macropodidae; Gray, 1821

Type genus
- Macropus Shaw, 1790

Genera
- †Cookeroo; †Ngamaroo?; †Purtia?; †Wabularoo?; Lagostrophinae Prideaux & Warburton, 2009; Lagostrophus; †Tjukuru; †Troposodon; Macropodinae; †Sthenurinae
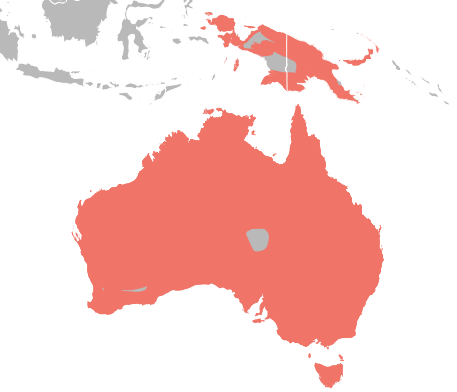
- Macropodidae distribution

= Macropodidae =

Macropods Temporal range: Late Oligocene–Present

Family of marsupial mammals

Macropodidae is a family of marsupials that includes kangaroos, wallabies, tree-kangaroos, wallaroos, pademelons, the quokka, and several other groups. These genera are allied to the suborder Macropodiformes, containing other macropods, and are native to the Australian continent (the mainland and Tasmania), New Guinea and nearby islands. As of 2025 there are 63 recognised living species in this family.

== Description ==
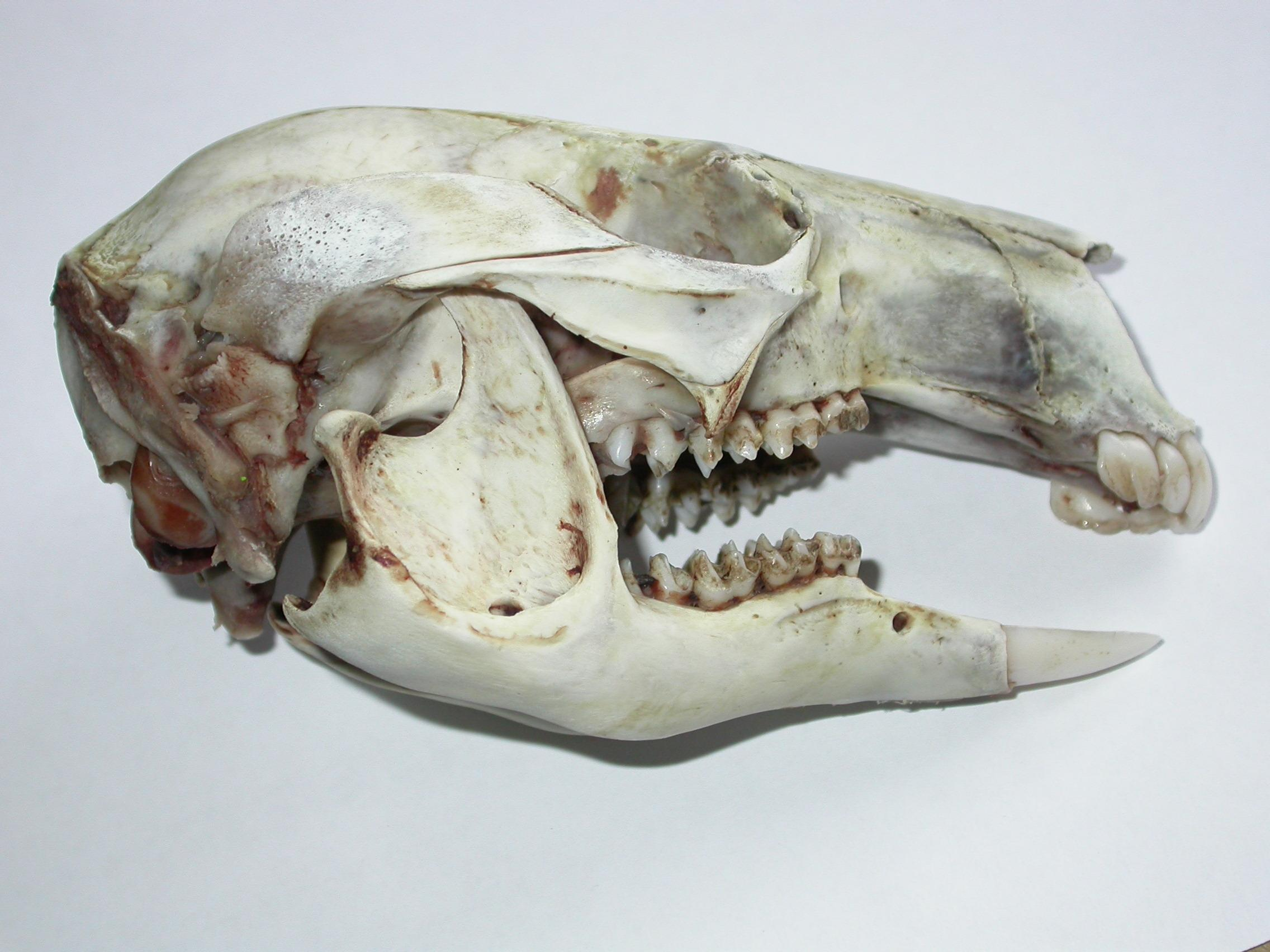
A Bennett's wallaby skull

Although omnivorous kangaroos lived in the past, these were not members of the family Macropodidae; modern macropods are generally herbivorous. Some are browsers, but most are grazers and are equipped with appropriately specialised teeth for cropping and grinding up fibrous plants, in particular grasses and sedges. Modern omnivorous kangaroos generally belong to a different family (for example, the musky rat-kangaroo). In general, macropods have a broad, straight row of cutting teeth at the front of the mouth, no canine teeth, and a gap before the molars. The molars are large and, unusually, do not appear all at once but a pair at a time at the back of the mouth as the animal ages, eventually becoming worn down by the tough, abrasive grasses and falling out. Like many Macropodiformes, early kangaroos had plagiaulacoids, but these converted into normal molars in more derived species. Most species have four molars and, when the last pair is too worn to be of use, the animals starve to death. The dental formula for macropods is 3.0–1.2.41.0.2.4.

Like the eutherian ruminants of the Northern Hemisphere (sheep, cattle, and so on), macropods have specialised digestive systems that use a high concentration of bacteria, protozoans, and fungi in the first chamber of a complex stomach to digest plant material. The details of organisation are quite different, but the result is somewhat similar.

The particular structure-function relationship of the Macropodidae gut and the gut microbiota allows the degradation of lignocellulosic material with a relatively low emission of methane relative to other ruminants. These low emissions are partly explained by the anatomical differences between the macropodid digestive system and that of ruminants, resulting in shorter retention times of particulate digesta within the foregut. This fact might prevent the establishment of methanogenic archaea, which has been found in low levels in tammar wallabies (Notamacropus eugenii) and eastern grey kangaroo (M. giganteus). Metagenomic analysis revealed that the foregut of tammar wallabies mainly contains bacteria belonging to the phyla Bacillota, Bacteroidota, and Pseudomonadota. Among Pseudomonadota populations of the Succinivibrionaceae family are overrepresented and may contribute to low methane emissions.

Macropods vary in size considerably, but most have very large hind legs and long, powerfully muscled tails. The term macropod comes from the Greek for 'large foot', as most have very long, narrow hind feet with a distinctive arrangement of toes. The fourth toe is very large and strong, the fifth toe moderately so; the second and third are fused; and the first toe is usually missing. Their short front legs have five separate digits. Some macropods have seven carpal bones instead of the usual eight in mammals. All have relatively small heads and most have large ears, except for tree-kangaroos, which must move quickly between closely spaced branches. The young are born very small and the pouch opens forward.

The unusual development of the hind legs is optimised for economical long-distance travel at fairly high speed. The greatly elongated feet provide enormous leverage for the strong legs, but the famous kangaroo hop has more: kangaroos and wallabies have a unique ability to store elastic strain energy in their tendons. In consequence, most of the energy required for each hop is provided "free" by the spring action of the tendons (rather than by muscular effort). The main limitation on a macropod's ability to leap is not the strength of the muscles in the hindquarters, it is the ability of the joints and tendons to withstand the strain of hopping.

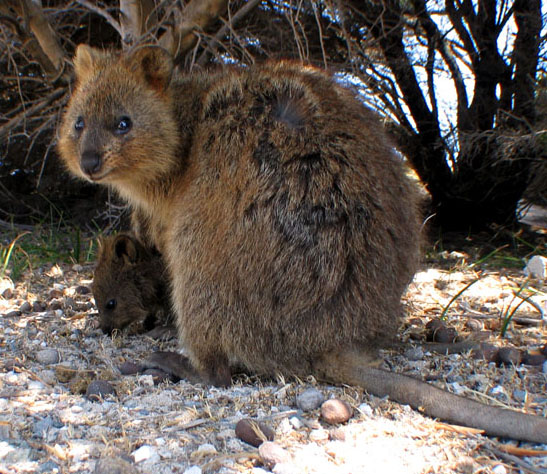
A female quokka with a joey

Furthermore, the act of hopping in kangaroos and wallabies is associated with their breathing process. The movement of their feet off the ground helps to expel air from their lungs, while bringing their feet forward for landing replenishes their lungs with air, resulting in greater energy efficiency. Studies conducted on these animals have shown that hopping at faster speeds requires only a minimal increase in effort beyond the energy required to hop in general, which is significantly less than what would be required in other animals like horses, dogs, or humans. Additionally, it has been observed that carrying extra weight requires little additional energy, which is particularly important for female kangaroos and wallabies carrying heavy pouch young.

The ability of larger macropods to survive on poor-quality, low-energy feed, and to travel long distances at high speed without great energy expenditure (to reach fresh food supplies or waterholes, and to escape predators) has been crucial to their evolutionary success on a continent that, because of poor soil fertility and low, unpredictable average rainfall, offers only very limited primary plant productivity.

Most macropod species have a polygynous mating system and produce a mating plug after copulation. Gestation in macropods lasts about a month, being slightly longer in the largest species. Typically, only a single young is born, weighing less than 1 g (0.035 oz) at birth. They soon attach themselves to one of four teats inside the mother's pouch. The young leave the pouch after five to 11 months, and are weaned after a further two to six months. Macropods reach sexual maturity at one to three years of age, depending on the species.

== Fossil record ==
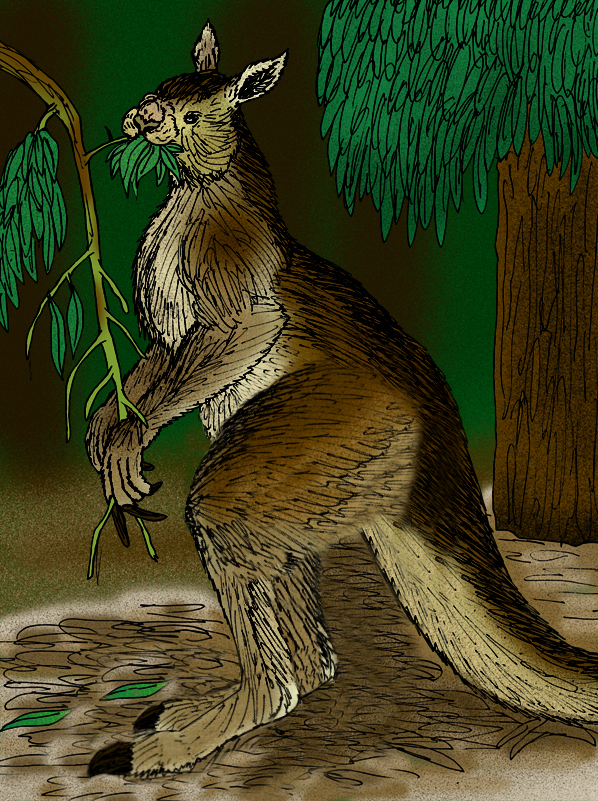
Procoptodon goliah

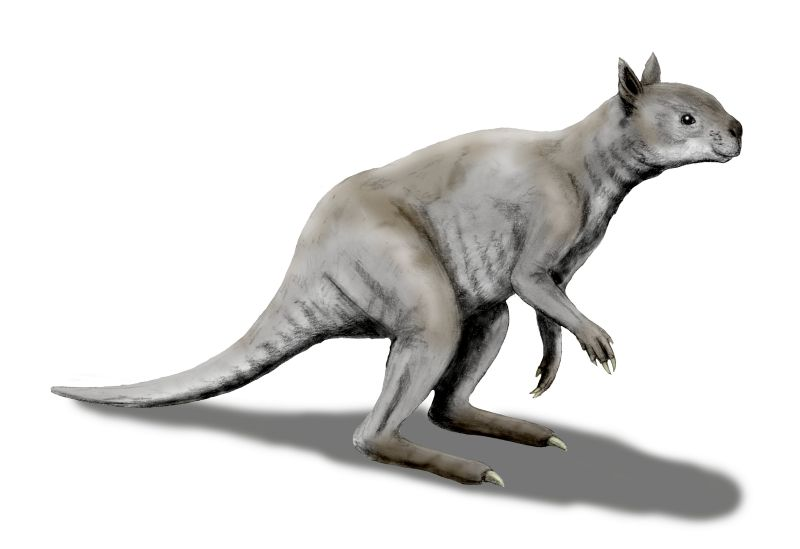
Simosthenurus occidentalis

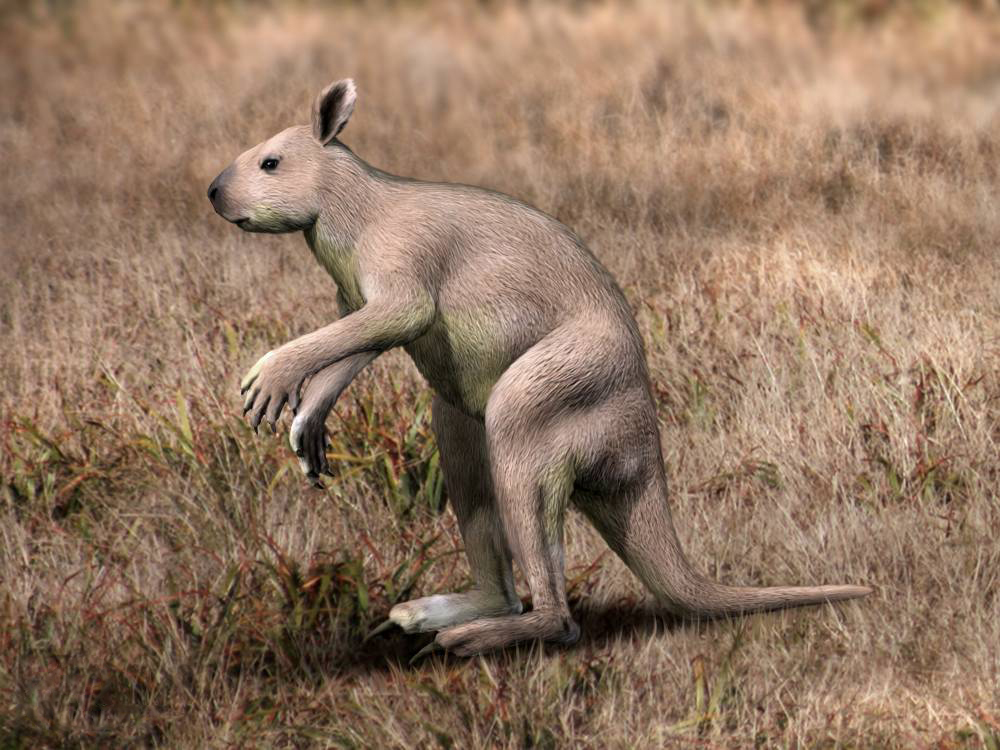
Sthenurus strilingi

The evolutionary ancestors of marsupials split from placental mammals during the Jurassic period about 160 million years ago (Mya). The earliest known fossil macropod dates back about 11.61 to 28.4 Mya, either in the Miocene or Late Oligocene, and was uncovered in South Australia. Unfortunately, the fossil could not be identified any further than the family. A Queensland fossil of a species similar to Hadronomas has been dated at around 5.33 to 11.61 Mya, falling in the Late Miocene or Early Pliocene. The earliest completely identifiable fossils are from around 5.33 Mya.

== Classification ==
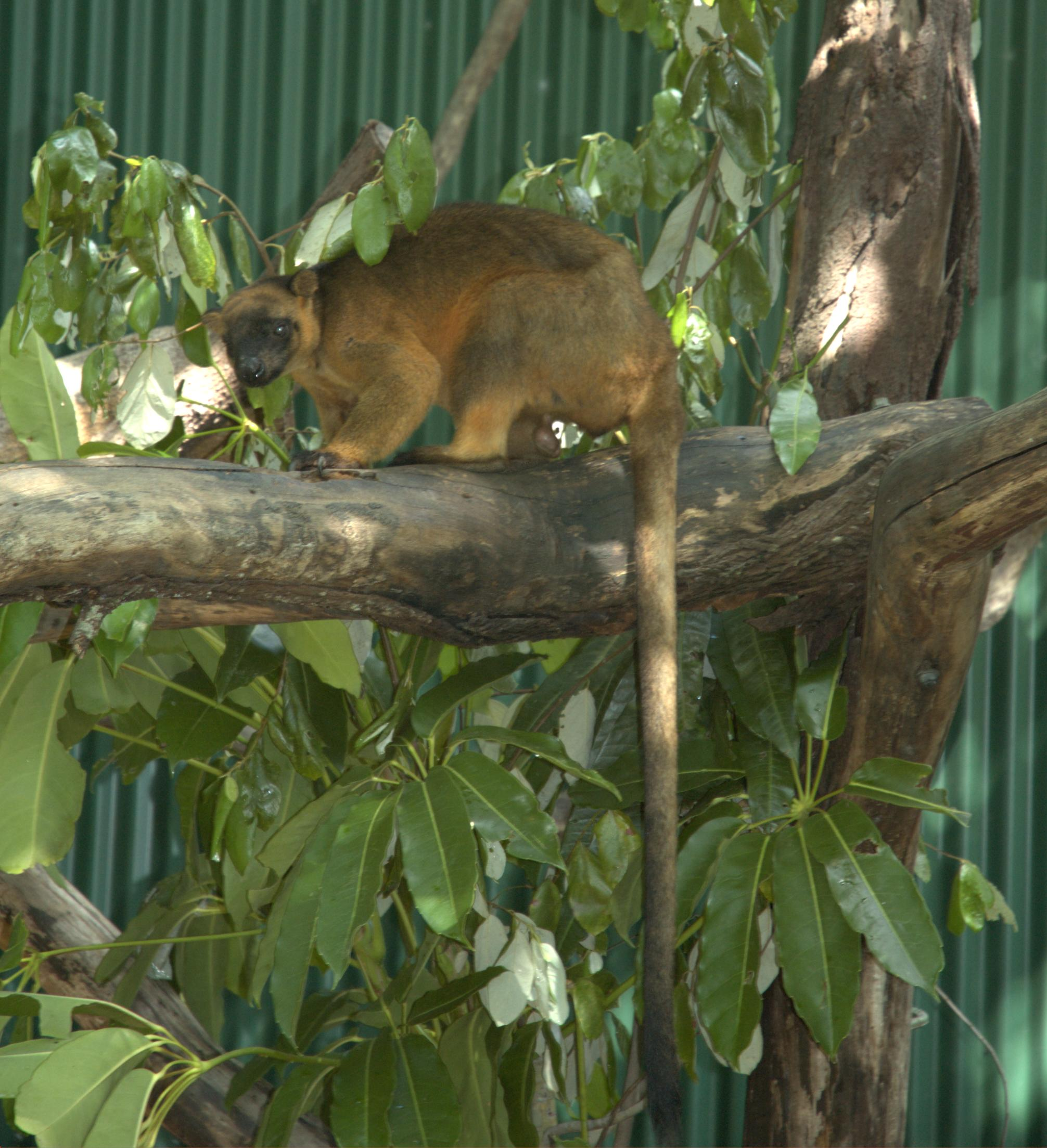
Tree-kangaroos have smaller ears for easier maneuvering between tree branches, and a much longer tail.

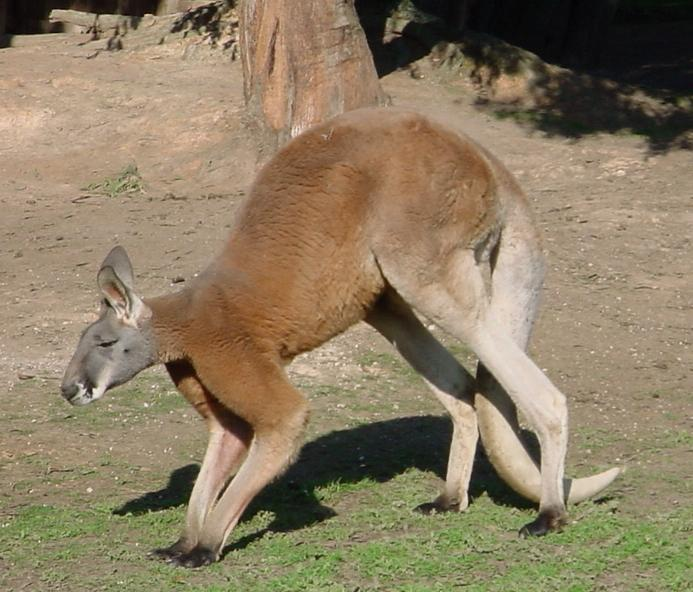
A red kangaroo showing pentapedal locomotion while grazing: the forelimbs and tail take the animal's weight while the hind legs are brought forward.

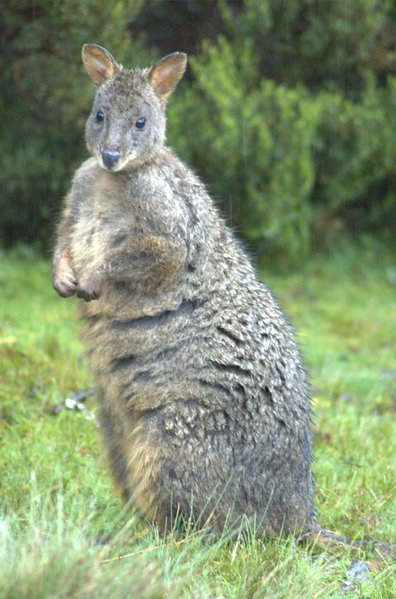
A pademelon has typical macropod legs, although they are obscured by fur in this image.

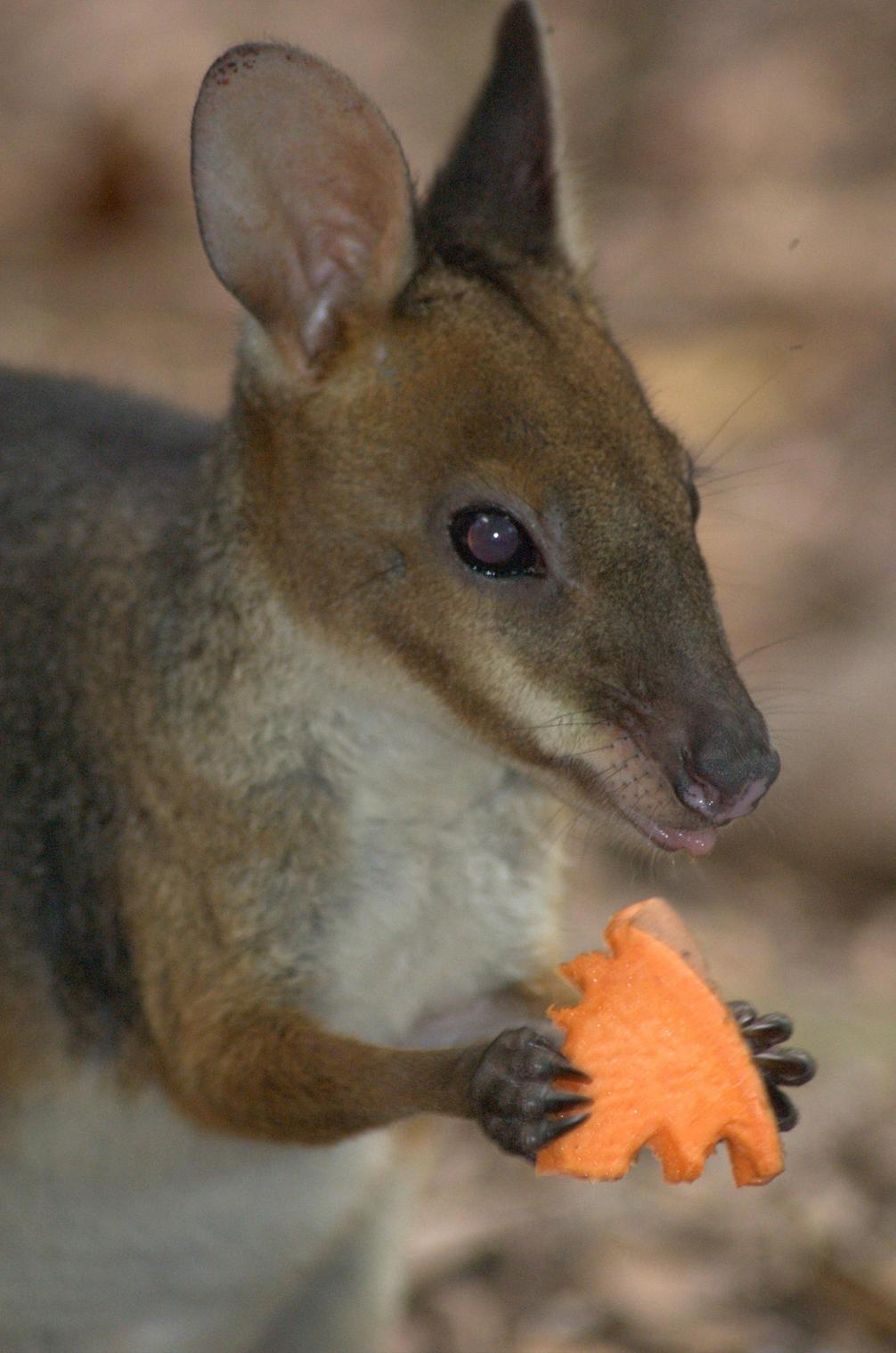
A pademelon eating a slice of sweet potato: Although usually grazing directly from the ground with their mouth, macropods may also use their front paws to assist in grazing.

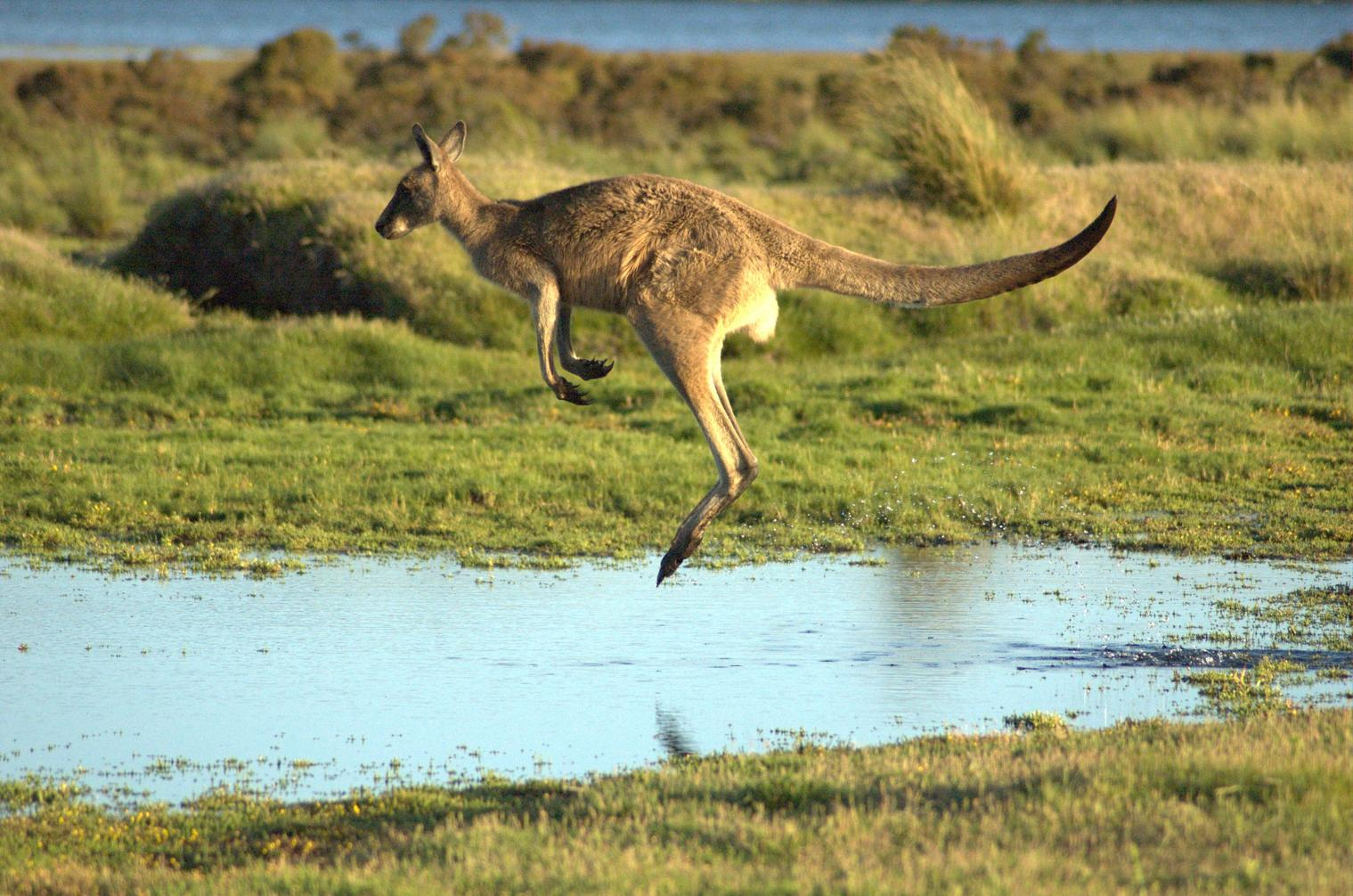
A "forester kangaroo" hopping over a puddle

The listing for extant species is based on The Third edition of Wilson & Reeder's Mammal Species of the World (2005), except where the Mammal Diversity Database and IUCN agree on a change. The two living subfamilies in the family Macropodidae are the Lagostrophinae, represented by a single species, the banded hare-wallaby, and the remainder, which make up the subfamily Macropodinae (67 species).

- Macropodidae
  - Genus †Watutia
  - Genus †Dorcopsoides
  - Genus †Kurrabi
  - Subfamily Lagostrophinae
    - Genus Lagostrophus
      - Banded hare-wallaby, Lagostrophus fasciatus
    - Genus †Protemnodon
    - Genus †Troposodon
  - Subfamily †Sthenurinae
    - Genus †Hadronomas
    - Tribe †Sthenurini
      - Genus †Sthenurus
      - Genus †Metasthenurus
    - Tribe †Simosthenurini
      - Genus †Archaeosimos
      - Genus †Simosthenurus
      - Genus †Procoptodon
  - Subfamily Macropodinae
    - Genus †Prionotemnus
    - Genus †Congruus
    - Genus †Baringa
    - Genus †Bohra
    - Genus †Synaptodon
    - Genus †Fissuridon
    - Genus †Silvaroo
    - Genus †Nombe
    - Genus Dendrolagus: tree-kangaroos
      - Grizzled tree-kangaroo, Dendrolagus inustus
      - Lumholtz's tree-kangaroo, Dendrolagus lumholtzi
      - Bennett's tree-kangaroo, Dendrolagus bennettianus
      - Ursine tree-kangaroo, Dendrolagus ursinus
      - Matschie's tree-kangaroo, Dendrolagus matschiei
      - Doria's tree-kangaroo, Dendrolagus dorianus
      - Goodfellow's tree-kangaroo, Dendrolagus goodfellowi
      - Lowlands tree-kangaroo, Dendrolagus spadix
      - Golden-mantled tree-kangaroo, Dendrolagus pulcherrimus
      - Seri's tree-kangaroo, Dendrolagus stellarum
      - Dingiso, Dendrolagus mbaiso
      - Tenkile, Dendrolagus scottae
      - Wondiwoi tree-kangaroo, Dendrolagus mayri
      - Ifola, Dendrolagus notatus
    - Genus Dorcopsis
      - Brown dorcopsis, Dorcopsis muelleri
      - White-striped dorcopsis, Dorcopsis hageni
      - Black dorcopsis, Dorcopsis atrata
      - Gray dorcopsis, Dorcopsis luctuosa
    - Genus Dorcopsulus
      - Small dorcopsis, Dorcopsulus vanheurni
      - Macleay's dorcopsis, Dorcopsulus macleayi
    - Genus Lagorchestes
      - †Lake Mackay hare-wallaby, Lagorchestes asomatus
      - Spectacled hare-wallaby, Lagorchestes conspicillatus
      - Rufous hare-wallaby, Lagorchestes hirsutus
      - †Eastern hare-wallaby, Lagorchestes leporides
    - Genus Macropus
      - Western grey kangaroo, Macropus fuliginosus
      - Eastern grey kangaroo, Macropus giganteus
    - Genus Notamacropus
      - Agile wallaby, Notamacropus agilis
      - Black-striped wallaby, Notamacropus dorsalis
      - Tammar wallaby, Notamacropus eugenii
      - Western brush wallaby, Notamacropus irma
      - Parma wallaby, Notamacropus parma
      - Whiptail wallaby, Notamacropus parryi
      - Red-necked wallaby, Notamacropus rufogriseus
      - †Toolache wallaby, Notamacropus greyi
    - Genus Onychogalea
      - Bridled nail-tail wallaby, Onychogalea fraenata
      - †Crescent nail-tail wallaby, Onychogalea lunata
      - Northern nail-tail wallaby, Onychogalea unguifera
    - Genus Osphranter
      - Antilopine kangaroo, Osphranter antilopinus
      - Black wallaroo, Osphranter bernardus
      - Common wallaroo, Osphranter robustus
      - Red kangaroo, Osphranter rufus
    - Genus Petrogale
      - P. brachyotis species-group
        - Short-eared rock-wallaby, Petrogale brachyotis
        - Monjon, Petrogale burbidgei
        - Nabarlek, Petrogale concinna
      - P. xanthopus species-group
        - Proserpine rock-wallaby, Petrogale persephone
        - Rothschild's rock-wallaby, Petrogale rothschildi
        - Yellow-footed rock-wallaby, Petrogale xanthopus
      - P. lateralis/penicillata species-group
        - Allied rock-wallaby, Petrogale assimilis
        - Cape York rock-wallaby, Petrogale coenensis
        - Godman's rock-wallaby, Petrogale godmani
        - Herbert's rock-wallaby, Petrogale herberti
        - Unadorned rock-wallaby, Petrogale inornata
        - Black-flanked rock-wallaby, Petrogale lateralis
        - Mareeba rock-wallaby, Petrogale mareeba
        - Brush-tailed rock-wallaby, Petrogale penicillata
        - Purple-necked rock-wallaby, Petrogale purpureicollis
        - Mount Claro rock-wallaby, Petrogale sharmani
    - Genus Setonix
      - Quokka or short-tailed scrub wallaby, Setonix brachyurus
    - Genus Thylogale
      - Tasmanian pademelon, Thylogale billardierii
      - Brown's pademelon, Thylogale browni
      - Dusky pademelon, Thylogale brunii
      - Calaby's pademelon, Thylogale calabyi
      - Mountain pademelon, Thylogale lanatus
      - Red-legged pademelon, Thylogale stigmatica
      - Red-necked pademelon, Thylogale thetis
    - Genus Wallabia
      - Swamp wallaby or black wallaby, Wallabia bicolor

== See also ==
- Australian megafauna
- Macropod hybrid
