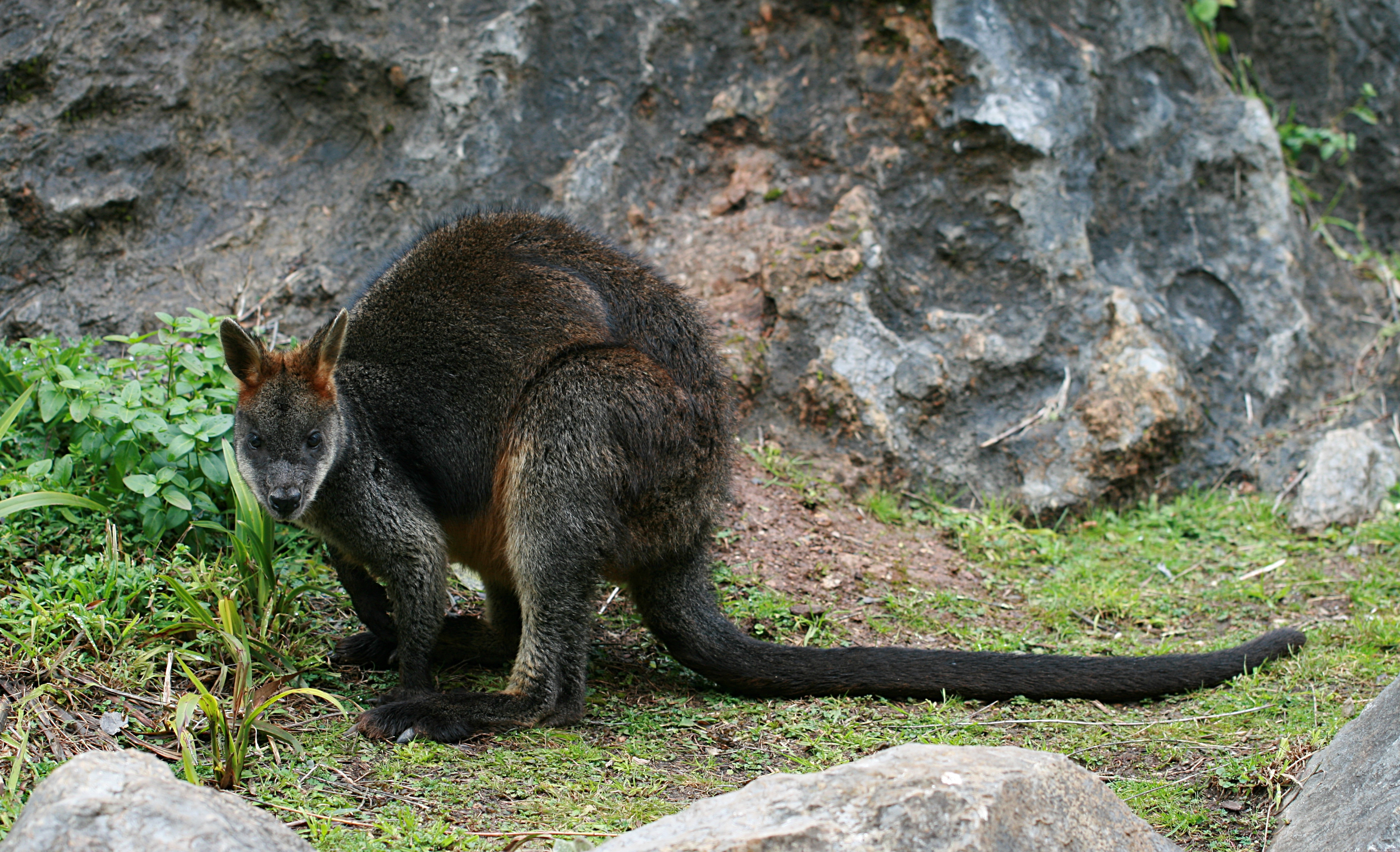

Conservation status
- Least Concern (IUCN 3.1)

Scientific classification
- Kingdom: Animalia
- Phylum: Chordata
- Class: Mammalia
- Infraclass: Marsupialia
- Order: Diprotodontia
- Family: Macropodidae
- Subfamily: Macropodinae
- Genus: Wallabia; Trouessart, 1905
- Species: W. bicolor

Binomial name
- Wallabia bicolor (Desmarest, 1804)
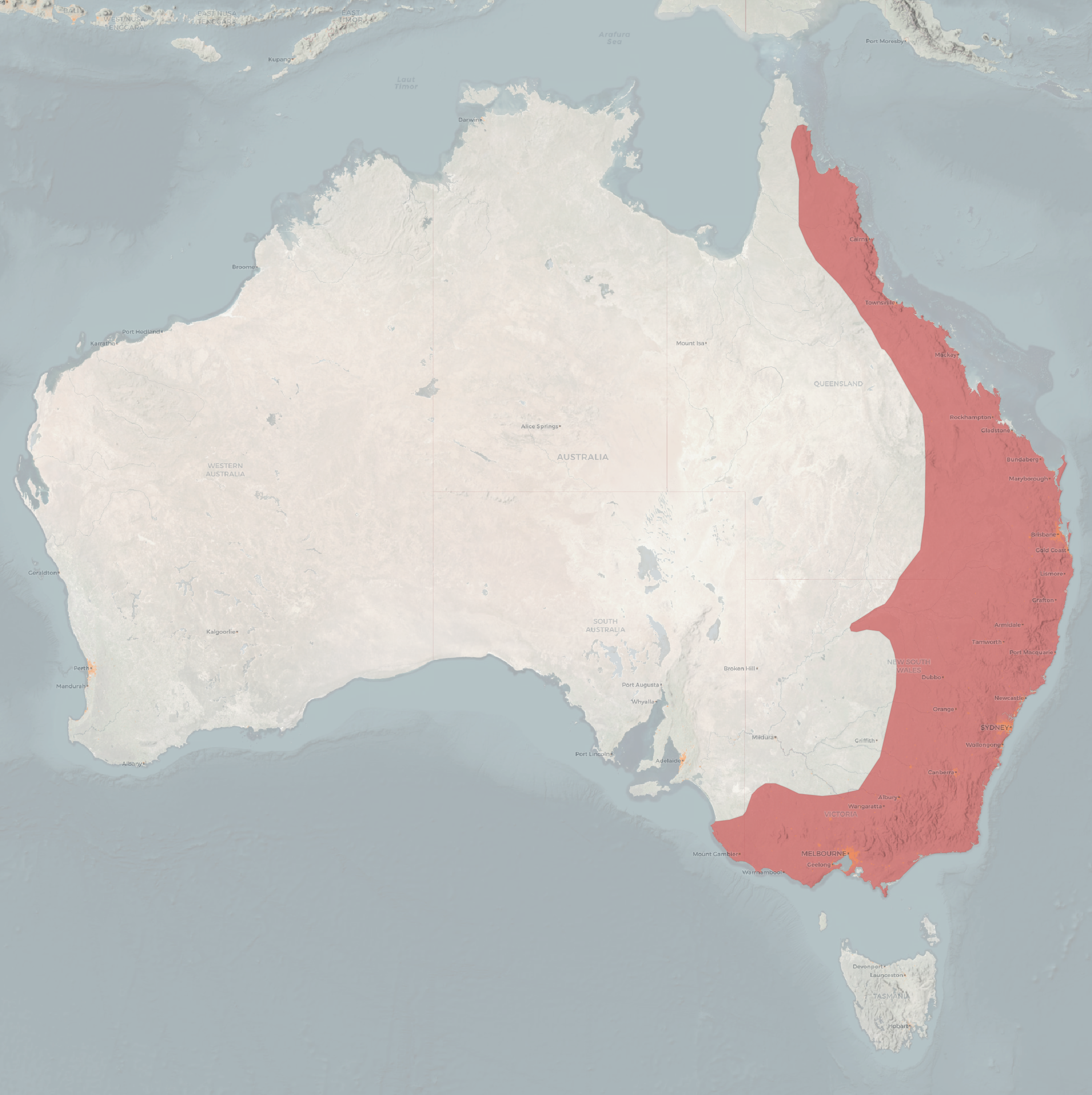
- Swamp wallaby range

Synonyms
- List: Kangurus bicolor Desmarest, 1804; Kangurus ualabatus Lesson & Garnot, 1826; Halmaturus lessonii Gray, 1837; Halmaturus nemoralis Wagner, 1842; Macropus ualabatus Thomas & Dollman, 1909

= Swamp wallaby =

Species of mammal

The swamp wallaby (Wallabia bicolor) is a small macropod marsupial of eastern Australia. This wallaby is also commonly known as the black wallaby, with other names including black-tailed wallaby, fern wallaby, black pademelon, stinker (in Queensland), and black stinker (in New South Wales) on account of its characteristic swampy odour.

The swamp wallaby is the only living member of the genus Wallabia.

== Etymology ==
Historic names for the swamp wallaby include Aroe kangaroo. The swamp wallaby is known as banggarai in the Dharawal language.

== Habitat and distribution ==
The swamp wallaby is found from the northernmost areas of Cape York Peninsula in Queensland, down the entire east coast and around to western Victoria and south-eastern South Australia, where it has greatly expanded its distribution over the past four decades. Advances in rabbit control appear to have resulted in extension of the swamp wallaby's distribution, which has expanded since the time of European settlement.

It inhabits thick undergrowth in forests and woodlands, or shelters during the day in thick grass or ferns, emerging at night to feed. They have been found to inhabit diverse habitats such as open farmland, mallee woodland, and sand-hills. Brigalow scrub in Queensland is a particularly favoured habitat.

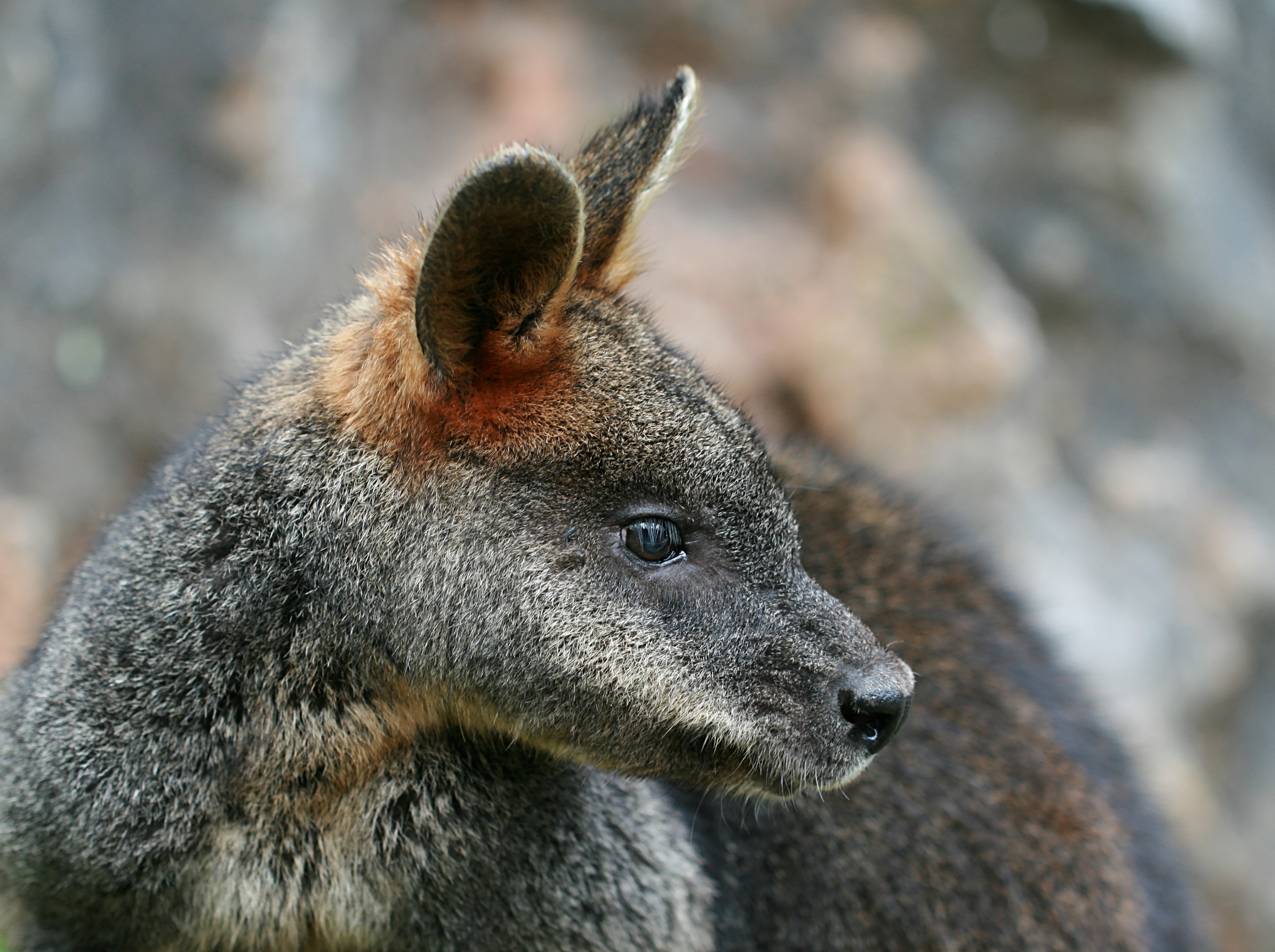
Note the light cheek stripe

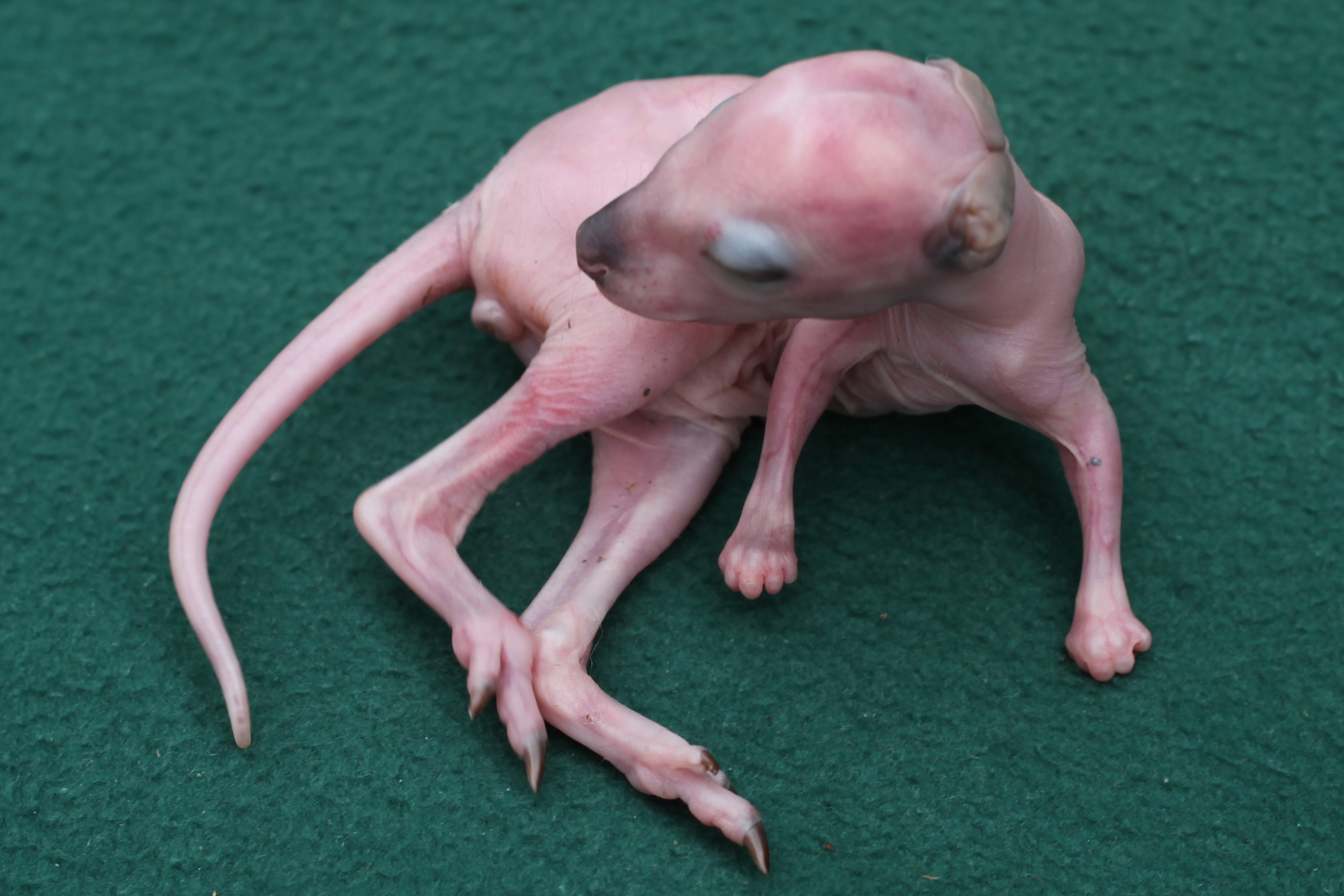
A "pinky" stage pouch joey

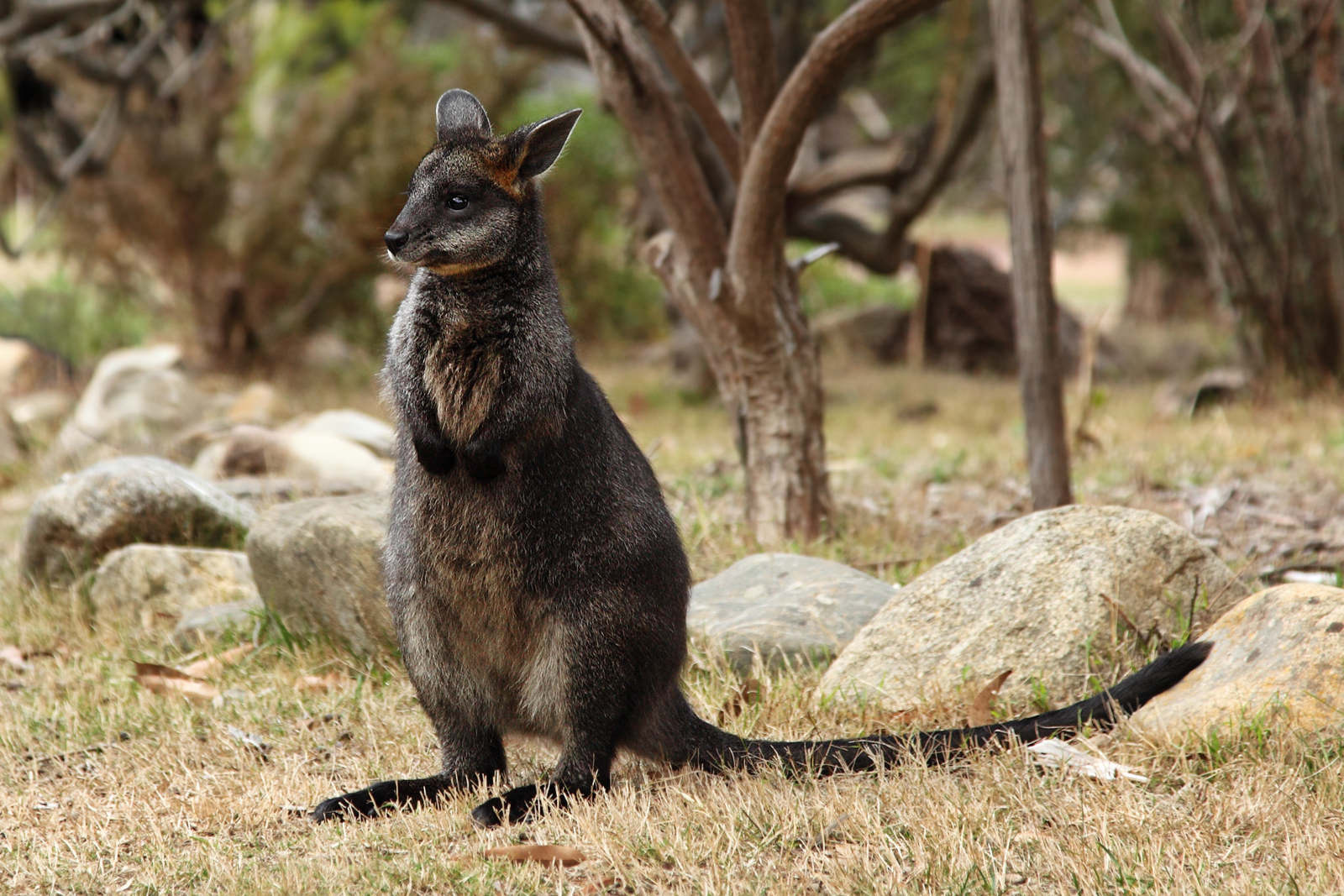
A "young at foot" joey

== Description ==
The species name bicolor comes from the distinct colouring variation, with the typical grey coat of the macropods varied with a dark brown to black region on the back, and light yellow to rufous orange on the chest. A light coloured cheek stripe is usually present, and extremities of the body generally show a darker colouring, except for the tip of the tail, which is often white.

The swamp wallaby also has a rare 'golden' morph, found on the North and South Stradbroke islands and adjacent mainland. It is a yellow color with a white muzzle. The nose and paws could be pink or black.

The gait differs from other wallabies, with the swamp wallaby carrying its head low and its tail out straight.

The average length is 76 cm (30 in) for males, and 70 cm (28 in) for females (excluding the tail). The tail in both sexes is approximately equal in length to the rest of the body. Average weight for males is 17 kg (37 lb), females averaging 13 kg (29 lb).

The swamp wallaby has seven carpal bones in the wrist (humans have eight).

== Reproduction ==
The swamp wallaby becomes reproductively fertile between 15 and 18 months of age, and can breed throughout the year. Gestation is from 33 to 38 days, leading to a single young. The young is carried in the pouch for 8 to 9 months, but will continue to suckle until about 15 months.

The swamp wallaby exhibits an unusual form of embryonic diapause, differing from other marsupials in having its gestation period longer than its oestrous cycle. This timing makes it possible for swamp wallaby females to overlap two pregnancies, gestating both an embryo and a fetus at the same time. The swamp wallaby ovulates, mates, conceives and forms a new embryo one to two days before the birth of their full-term fetus. Consequently, females are continuously pregnant throughout their reproductive life.

The swamp wallaby is notable for having a distinct sex-chromosome system from most other Theria (the subclass that includes marsupials and placental mammals). Females are characterized by the XX pair typical of therians, but males have one X chromosome and two non-sequence homology Y chromosomes. This system is thought to arise from a series of chromosomal fusions over the last 6 million years.

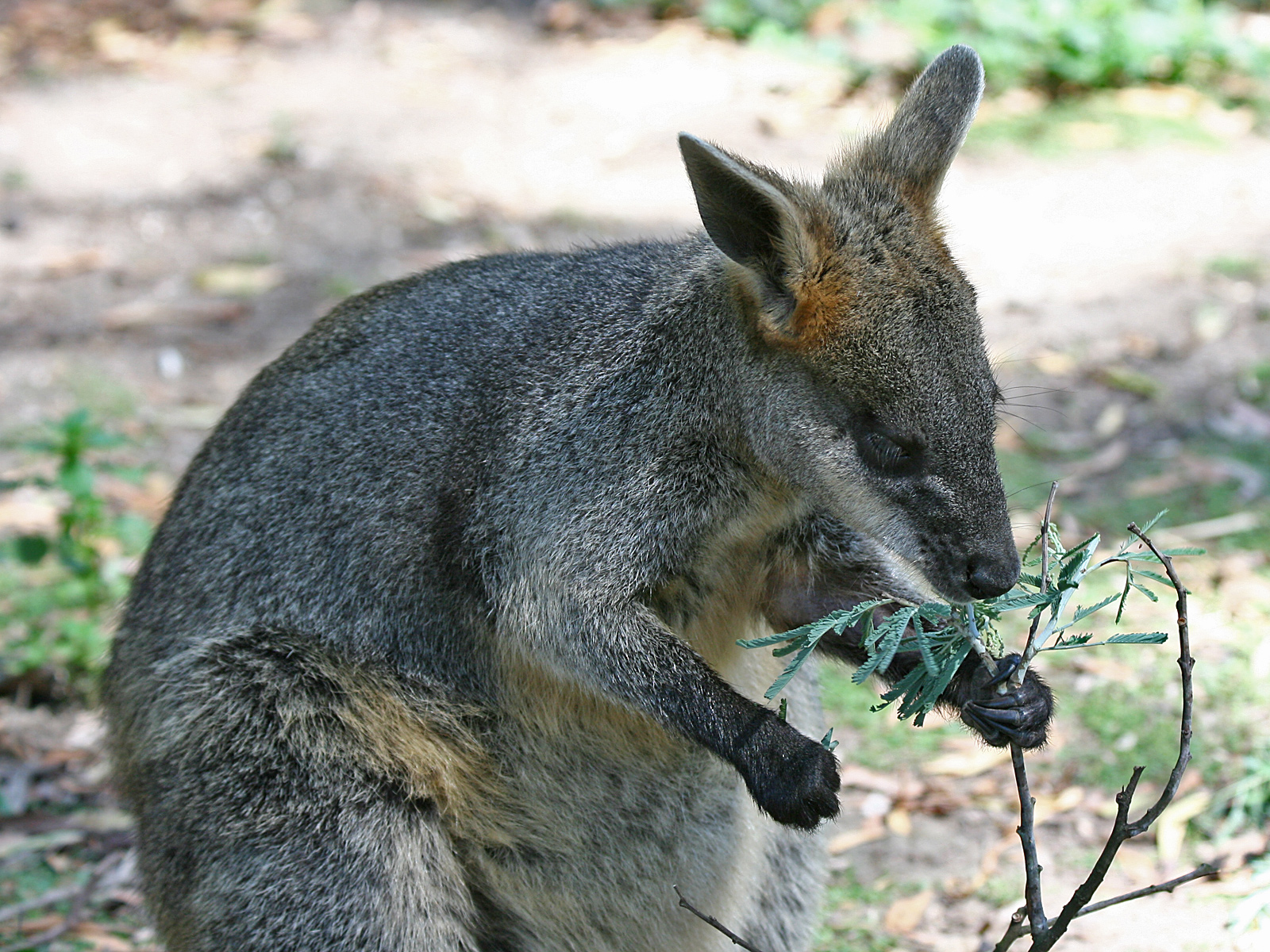
A swamp wallaby feeding on leaves

== Feeding ==
The swamp wallaby is typically a solitary animal, but often aggregates into groups when feeding. It will eat a wide range of food plants, depending on availability, including shrubs, pasture, agricultural crops, and native and exotic vegetation. It appears to be able to tolerate a variety of plants poisonous to many other animals, including brackens, hemlock and lantana.

The ideal diet appears to involve browsing on shrubs and bushes, rather than grazing on grasses. This is unusual in wallabies and other macropods, which typically prefer grazing. Tooth structure reflects this preference for browsing, with the shape of the molars differing from other wallabies. The fourth premolar is retained through life, and is shaped for cutting through coarse plant material.

There is evidence that the swamp wallaby is an opportunist taking advantage of food sources when they become available, such as fungi, bark and algae. There is also one reported case of the consumption of carrion.

== Taxonomy ==
Several physical and behavioral characteristics make the swamp wallaby different enough from other wallabies that it is placed apart in its own genus, Wallabia. However, genetic evidence demonstrates that Wallabia is embedded within the large genus Macropus, necessitating reclassification of this species in the future.

== Threats ==
Anthropogenic actions, such as the increase in roads through swamp wallaby habitats, are a threat to their survival. They are frequently seen near the side of roads, leading to a larger number becoming roadkill.

Other sources of threat for the swamp wallaby are their predators, which include dingoes, eagles and wild dogs.
