= Hadronomas =

Hadronomas Temporal range: Late Miocene–Late Pliocene

Scientific classification
- Kingdom: Animalia
- Phylum: Chordata
- Class: Mammalia
- Infraclass: Marsupialia
- Order: Diprotodontia
- Family: Macropodidae
- Subfamily: †Sthenurinae
- Genus: †Hadronomas; Woodburne, 1967

Type species
- †Hadronomas puckridgi Woodburne, 1967

Extinct genus of marsupials

Hadronomas is an extinct genus of kangaroo in the subfamily Sthenurinae. There is only one described species, Hadronomas puckridgi, known from various fossil material from the Alcoota Fauna site, and an undescribed species from Lake Kanunka.

== Description ==
Hadronomas had a simple talonid wall characterised by the absence of a posthypocristid.
