= Silvaroo =

Silvaroo Temporal range: Pleistocene

Scientific classification
- Domain: Eukaryota
- Kingdom: Animalia
- Phylum: Chordata
- Class: Mammalia
- Infraclass: Marsupialia
- Order: Diprotodontia
- Family: Macropodidae
- Subfamily: Macropodinae
- Genus: †Silvaroo; Dawson, 2004

Species
- Silvaroo bandharr Silvaroo buloloensis

Extinct genus of marsupials

Silvaroo is an extinct genus of megafaunal macropods that existed in Australia in the Pleistocene. Based on fossil evidence and affinities with the extant forest wallabies from the genera Dorcopsis and Dorcopsulus from Papua New Guinea, the two species of this genus were removed from the genus Protemnodon to Silvaroo.
