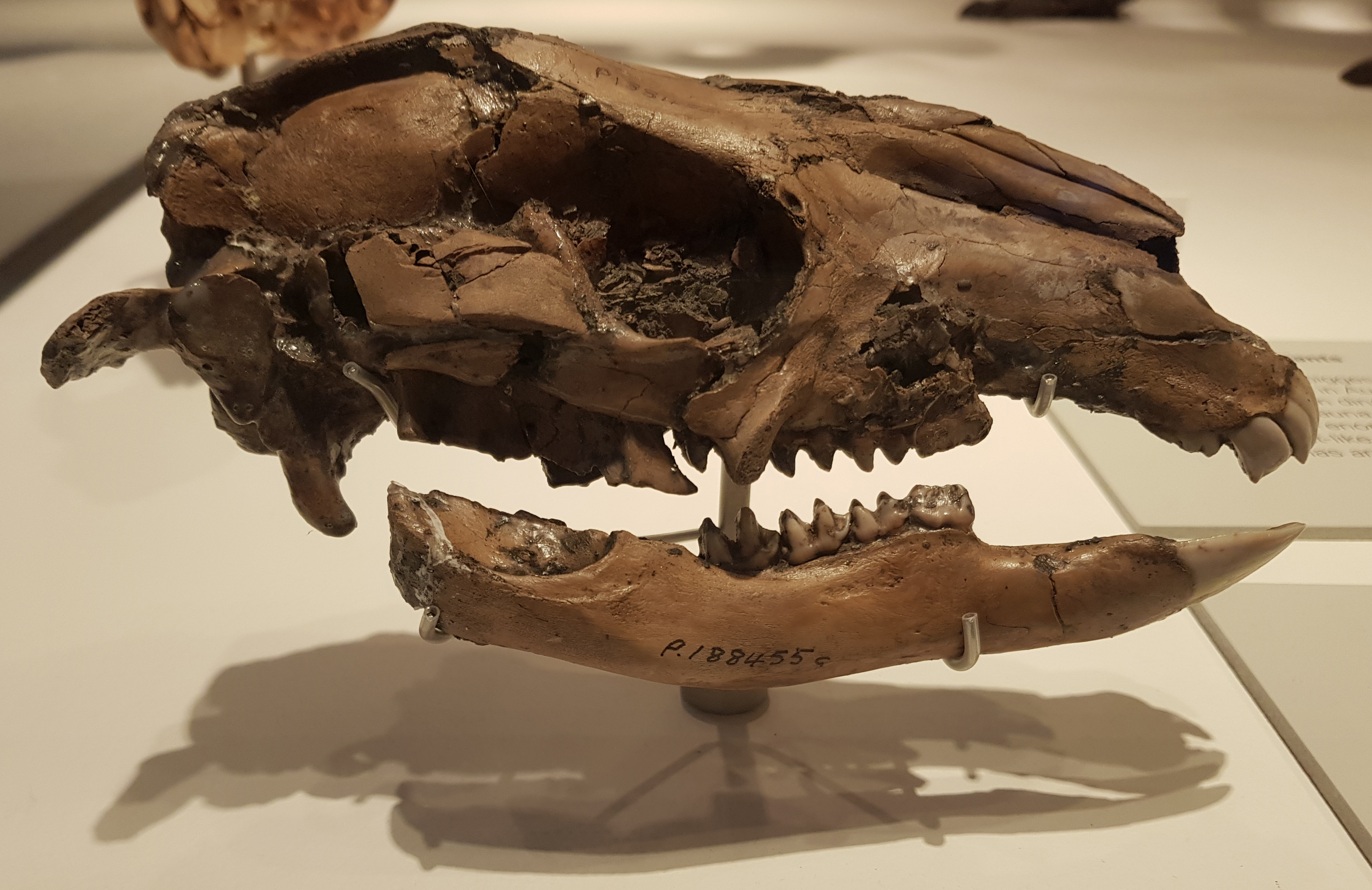
- Skull of Protemnodon anak at the Melbourne Museum

Scientific classification
- Kingdom: Animalia
- Phylum: Chordata
- Class: Mammalia
- Infraclass: Marsupialia
- Order: Diprotodontia
- Family: Macropodidae
- Subfamily: Macropodinae
- Genus: †Protemnodon; Owen, 1874

Type species
- †Protemnodon anak Owen, 1874

Species
- †P. anak Owen, 1874; †P. otibandus Plane, 1967; †P. snewini Bartholomai, 1978; †P. tumbuna Flannery et al., 1983; †P. mamkurra Kerr et al., 2024; †P. viator Kerr et al., 2024; †P. dawsonae Kerr et al., 2024

= Protemnodon =

Protemnodon Temporal range: Early Pliocene - Middle Holocene, 5.3–0.0053 Ma

Extinct genus of marsupials

Protemnodon is an extinct genus of megafaunal macropodids that existed in Australia, Tasmania, and New Guinea in the Pliocene, Pleistocene, and Holocene. Members of this genus are also called giant kangaroos.

== Taxonomy ==
Recent analysis of mtDNA extracted from fossils indicates that Protemnodon was closely related to Macropus. The species formerly known as Protemnodon bandharr and Protemnodon buloloensis have been moved to a new genus, Silvaroo, while the New Guinean species P. nombe has been moved to the new genus Nombe.

A 2024 review of the genus recognized seven valid species, including three new ones:

- P. anak Owen, 1874 (type species)
- P. otibandus Plane, 1967
- P. snewini Bartholomai, 1978
- P. tumbuna Flannery et al., 1983
- P. mamkurra Kerr et al., 2024
- P. viator Kerr et al., 2024
- P. dawsonae Kerr et al., 2024

P. chinchillaensis and P. hopei were considered junior synonyms of P. otibandus and P. tumbuna respectively. P. brehus, P. roechus, P. mimas, P. antaeus, and P. devisi were considered nomina dubia.

== Description ==
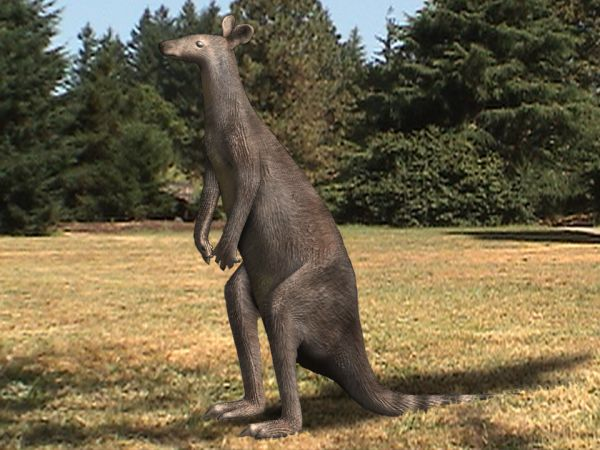
Restoration of Protemnodon anak

Based on fossil evidence, Protemnodon is thought to have been physically similar to wallabies, but generally larger and more robust. Protemnodon roechus was the largest in the genus, weighing around 170 kg.

Some studies show that Protemnodon species ranged from efficient hoppers of dry open habitats (such as P. viator) to slower, more quadrupedal forest dwellers (like P. tumbuna), while others have found that even species such as P. viator were very inefficient hoppers and primarily quadrupedal. The shape and articulation of the forelimbs suggests that they may have been adept at digging, while the claws on their hind feet had a curved shape, perhaps to help stabilise the animal on uneven ground.

Several species of Protemnodon survived up until around 50,000 years ago. P. tumbuna may have survived in the highlands of Papua New Guinea as recently as 12,000 years B.P. A phalanx belonging to a member of Protemnodon from the Taora rockshelter (Papua New Guinea) was dated to around 6,800-5,300 years ago, marking the youngest occurrence for the species and the youngest currently-known occurrence of Sahul's Pleistocene megafauna. The continued survival of this population is thought to have been partially aided by its geographic isolation which lacked notable human presence.

== Palaeobiology ==
An analysis of fossil-derived ^{87}Sr/^{86}Sr from Protemnodon from a rainforest ecosystem that existed around Mt. Etna around 280 ka has found that they had a very small lifetime foraging range for a megafaunal animal. The mean area of these individuals' home range was 11.6 ± 5.8 km^{2}.
