= Elizabeth Gould (illustrator) =

English artist, illustrator and lithographer (1804–1841)

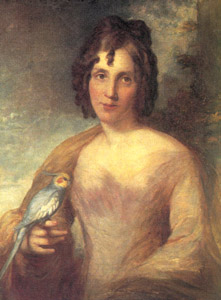
- Born: Elizabeth Coxen; 18 July 1804; Ramsgate, England
- Died: 15 August 1841 (aged 37); England
- Resting place: Kensal Green Cemetery
- Known for: Skilled drawing, watercolor painting and lithography, aiding her husband in illustrating many of his books.
- Notable work: Sizeable collection of illustrations for The Birds of Australia
- Spouse: John Gould
- Children: Charles Gould

Elizabeth Gould (née Coxen; 18 July 1804 – 15 August 1841) was a British artist and illustrator at the forefront of the natural history movement. Elizabeth traveled and worked alongside her husband, naturalist and author John Gould. She produced illustrations and lithographs for ornithological works, including plates in Darwin's The Zoology of the Voyage of H.M.S. Beagle and the Goulds' seminal work, The Birds of Australia. In total, Elizabeth is credited with at least 650 works.

== Life and artistic career ==
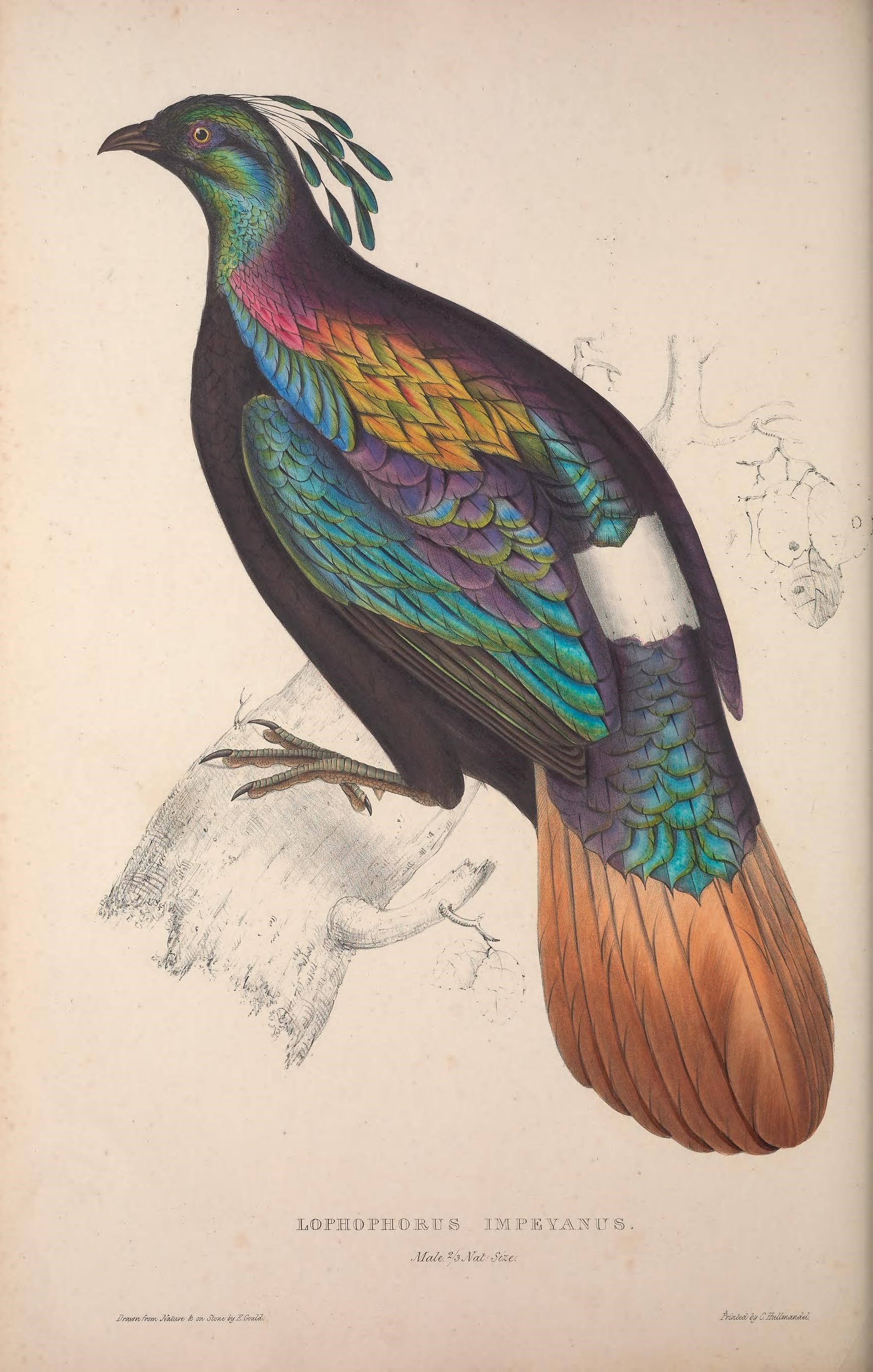
An example of the highly precise coloring and sheen in Elizabeth's use of lithography

Elizabeth was born on 18 July 1804 in Ramsgate, England to a military family. Little is known of her early life, however it is likely that Elizabeth underwent training in drawing and botany from a young age. In Victorian England, botany and natural history were part of the education of girls in middle-class English families. As Ann Moyal stated, "Cultivated women drew, walked, observed, collected specimens, arranged and painted."

When aged twenty-two, Elizabeth was employed as a governess, and lived in James Street, London. It is known that she met John Gould through her brother, Charles Coxen, who was a fellow taxidermist. She married John in January 1829, when they were both 24 years old. Elizabeth began her professional work-life by producing ornithological drawings intended to supplement John's ornithological writing in letters to colleagues. Her first published work was in 1832 with A Century of Birds from the Himalaya Mountains. Lacking a publisher, the Goulds decided to publish it themselves.

In the early days of the couple's partnership, Elizabeth provided an income for her family through selling her drawings. John encouraged her to learn lithography and asked his collaborator Edward Lear to teach her. The extent of Lear's direct influence on the artist is uncertain, but they moved in a circle of artists and natural historians working on similar publications. Elizabeth's work entailed making designs, compositions, and detailed observations of depictions of exotic birds, so that the works could be made into lithographic reproductions. In addition to that, Elizabeth made watercolor paintings accompanied with color keys for colorists to copy. All of the group were enthused with the depiction and scientific illustration of the unknown animals found on European expeditions, especially the novelties in English collections of Australian birds and mammals.

Once proficient with the art form, she created illustrations from John's more rudimentary drawings. Elizabeth's knowledge of art and her skills were not handed to her by her husband. Their skills were complementary and the pair worked together to make significant advances in the world of natural history and ornithology. The Goulds skilfully emphasised the aesthetic value of nature, while educating those around them about new species, nurturing a need for the representations of birds and other species. In her eleven-year career (1830–1841), Elizabeth designed, lithographed and painted more than 650 plates, which appeared in:

- A Century of Birds from the Himalaya Mountains (1831 and 1832). 80 plates. For this book, she worked with taxidermied birds.
- The Birds of Europe (1832–1837). 380 plates. For this book, live (caged) birds were available for her reference. This is when her signature style of ornate backgrounds and realistic shading were first realized. Lithography allowed for more realistic textures, such as feathers and fluff.
- A Monograph of the Ramphastidae, or Family of Toucans (1834). 24 plates.
- A Monograph of the Trogonidae, or family of trogons (1835–1838). Most of the 36 plates.
- The Zoology of the Voyage of H.M.S. Beagle, pt. III. Birds (1838). Gould created all 50 plates for this work but is uncredited.
- A Synopsis of the Birds of Australia (1837–38).120 plates.
- The Birds of Australia (1837–38). 84 plates, as well as an unspecified number of designs. This was the Gould's biggest and most ambitious project. Elizabeth sketched these subjects alive. Her most famous work is an image of the fairy wren (then known as the blue warbler).
- The Birds of Australia (1840–1848). Many of the 681 hand-coloured plates prepared by Gould have been digitised by the State Library of New South Wales.
- Icones avium, or, Figures and descriptions of new and interesting species of birds from various parts of the globe (1837–38). 20 plates.

Elizabeth's early illustrations have been described as stiff, but they improved with experience. They are quite formal compositions, due to their use in ornithological classification.

The Goulds and the oldest of their surviving four children travelled to Australia in 1838. Elizabeth spent much of her time in Hobart as a guest of British explorer Jane Franklin. John travelled extensively collecting specimens and Elizabeth drew and painted them. Her brother Charles Coxen also migrated to Australia, where he and his wife Elizabeth Coxen, who were also interested in natural history, became members of the Queensland Philosophical Society.

While in Australia, Elizabeth made hundreds of drawings from specimens for the publications Birds of Australia and A Monograph of the Macropodidæ, or Family of Kangaroos, as well as illustrations for the ornithology volume of Charles Darwin's Zoology of the Voyage of HMS Beagle.

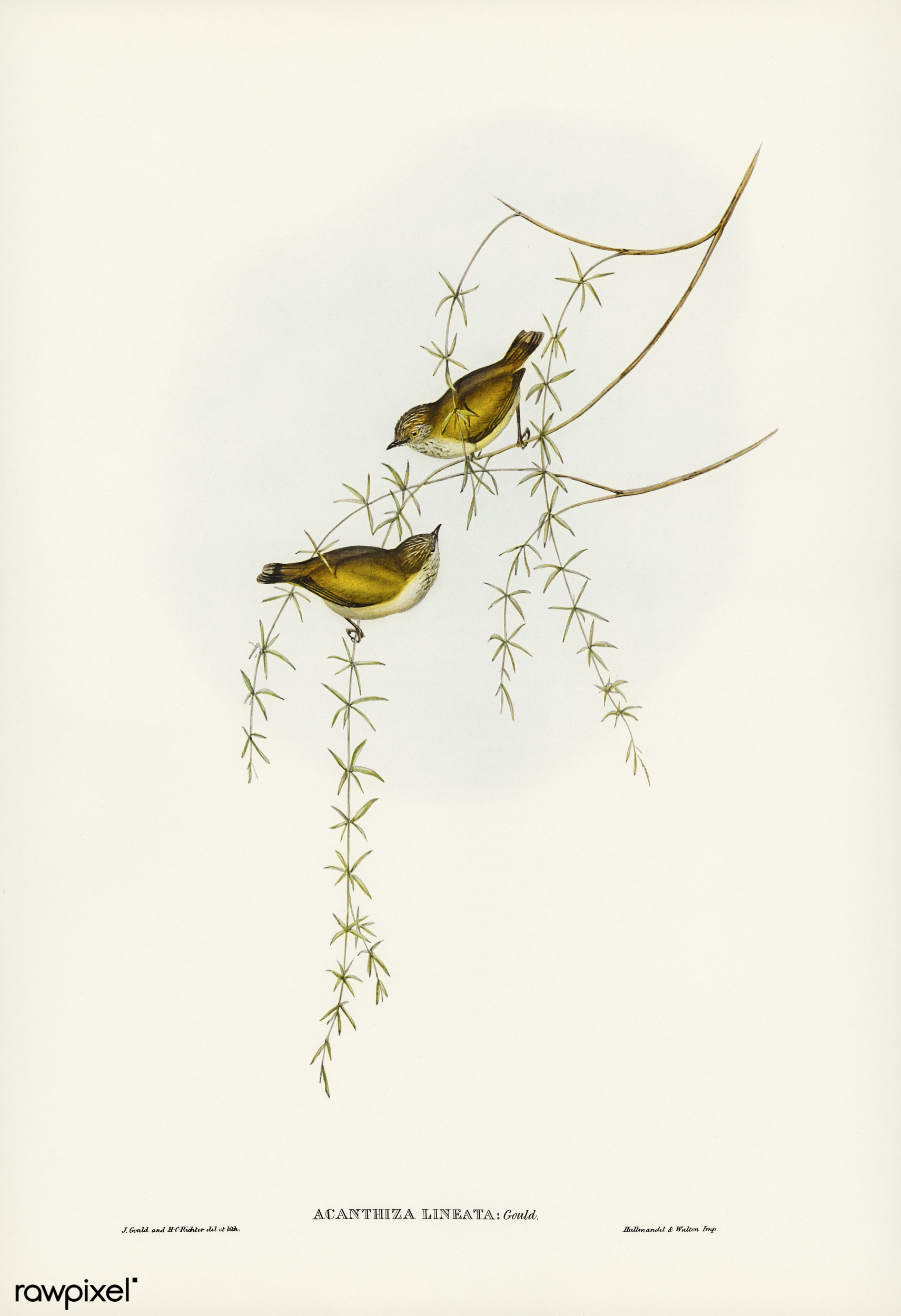
Striated Acanthiza (Acanthiza lineata) illustrated by Elizabeth Gould for John Gould's Birds of Australia

She bore one son while living in Australia, and gave birth to their eighth child when they returned to England in 1840. (Note: Only six of the Gould's children survived to adulthood.) Elizabeth did not live to see the completion of her research, dying of puerperal fever shortly after the birth of her last child.

Gould completed 84 plates for the monumental, seven-volume book, The Birds of Australia, before her death. Henry Constantine Richter (H.C. Richter) was employed by John Gould following Elizabeth's death, and worked on completing the illustrations in The Birds of Australia. The sketches of Elizabeth and Richter are difficult to distinguish from each other. Likely, her sketches informed the work of Richter. Though new artists were found to illustrate John's books, it is evident that he was devastated by the loss of Elizabeth. He never remarried and honored his wife for the extent of her involvement in his work.

== Legacy and commemoration ==
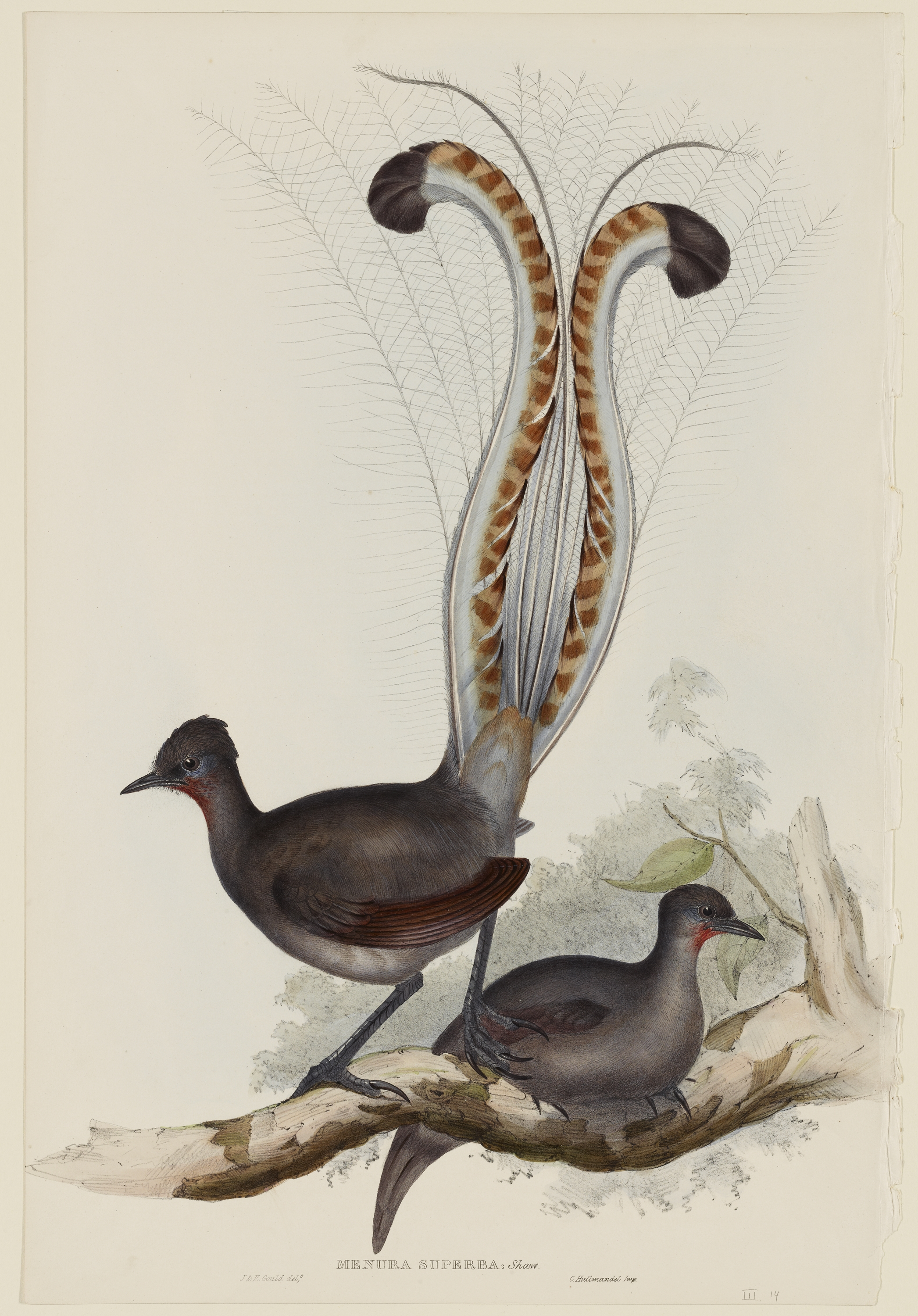
An example of a lithograph with attribution shared between Elizabeth and John Gould

A complete account of her life, The Story of Elizabeth Gould, was published by Alec Chisholm in 1944. Little was known about her until 1938, when a collection of her letters written from Australia was discovered, which were the basis for the book. Now housed in the Mitchell Library, the letters reveal Elizabeth as a charming, cultured, talented woman, both musically and artistically. A more recent book showcases hundreds of Gould's illustrations and documents her impressive yet short career as scientific illustrator.

The Gouldian finch (Chloebia gouldiae) and Mrs. Gould's sunbird (Aethopyga gouldiae) were named in her honor. John Gould named the Gouldian Finch in memory of his wife, stating "It was with feelings of the purest affection that I ventured, in the folio edition, to dedicate this lovely bird to the memory of my late wife, who for many years laboriously assisted me with her pencil, accompanied me to Australia, and cheerfully interested herself in all my pursuits." Mrs. Gould's sunbird was also named for Elizabeth, this time by Nicholas Vigors, a friend of the Gould's and contributor to John Gould's work.

Although the Goulds spent less than two years in Australia, The Birds of Australia remains the definitive work on the subject.

A copy of A Century of Birds from the Himalaya Mountains, illustrated by Gould, and the property of Sir Stephen Glynne by original subscription, held ever since by the Gladstone family of Hawarden Castle, was offered for auction by Chrisities estimate £20,000–30,000 in July 2023.

== Attribution and contemporary scholarship ==
There is a growing body of critical research exploring the attribution of Elizabeth's work to her husband. His own role in producing the lithographs has been questioned and examples of his style of drawing have been examined, which suggest that the actual drawing and coloring is likely to have been the sole work of Elizabeth.

Her role as sole artist of their first collection A Century of Birds from the Himalaya Mountains was acknowledged on every lithograph, with the attribution "Drawn from Nature and on Stone by E. Gould." Subsequent collections used "J & E Gould". Birds of Australia includes a number of attributions to "J & E Gould". Scholars feel that Elizabeth's exhaustive work creating an archive of preparatory drawings for the lithographs before her death was not adequately recognized.

== Portrayals in popular media ==
Elizabeth is the principal character in the 2016 novel, The Birdman's Wife, written by Melissa Ashley, which won the University of Queensland Fiction Book Award in the 2017 Queensland Literary Awards.

== Gallery ==
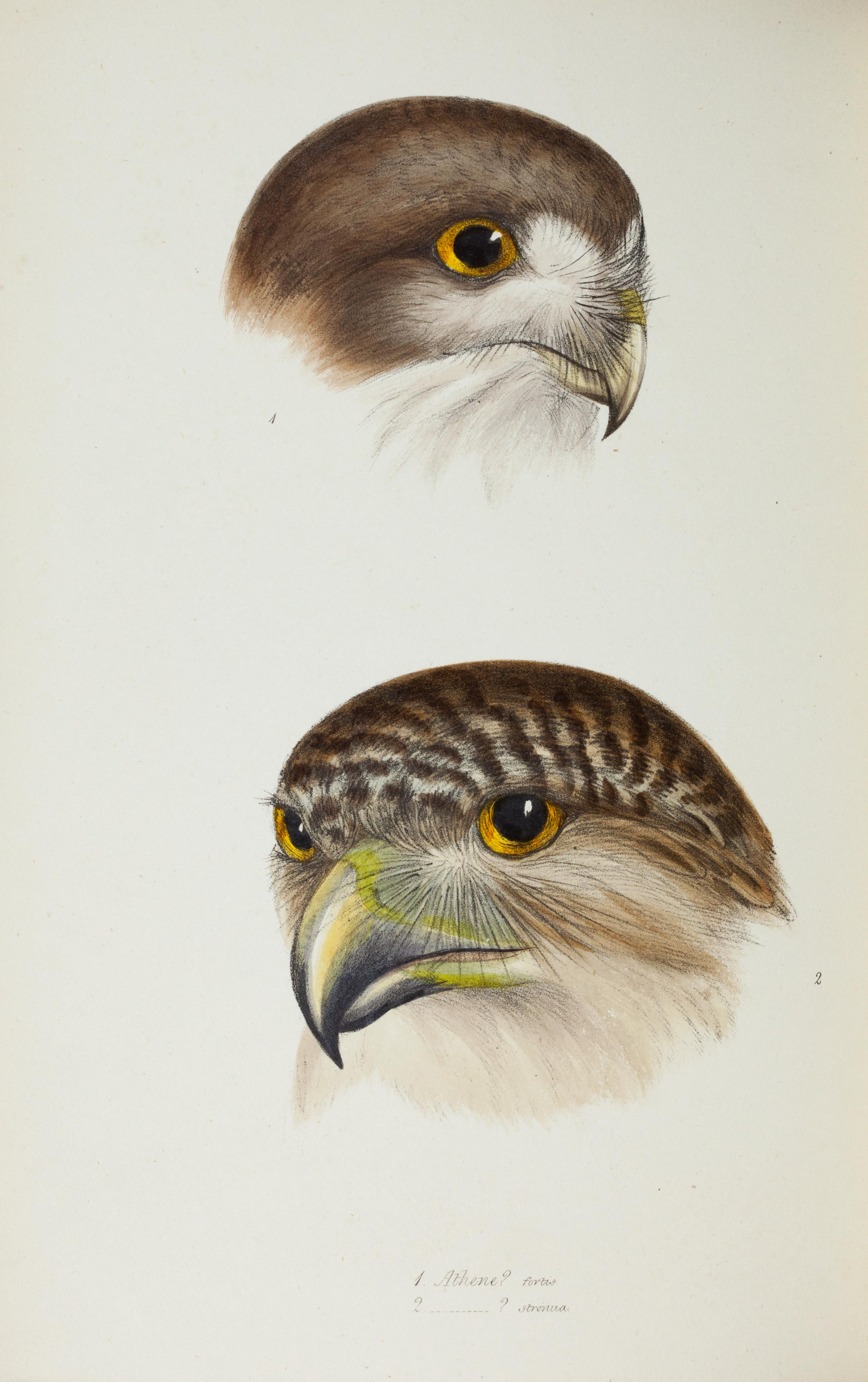

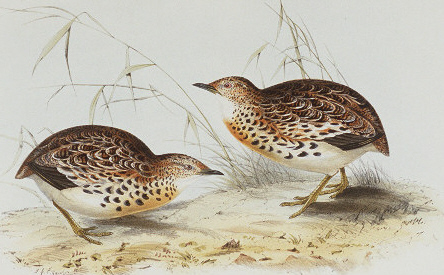

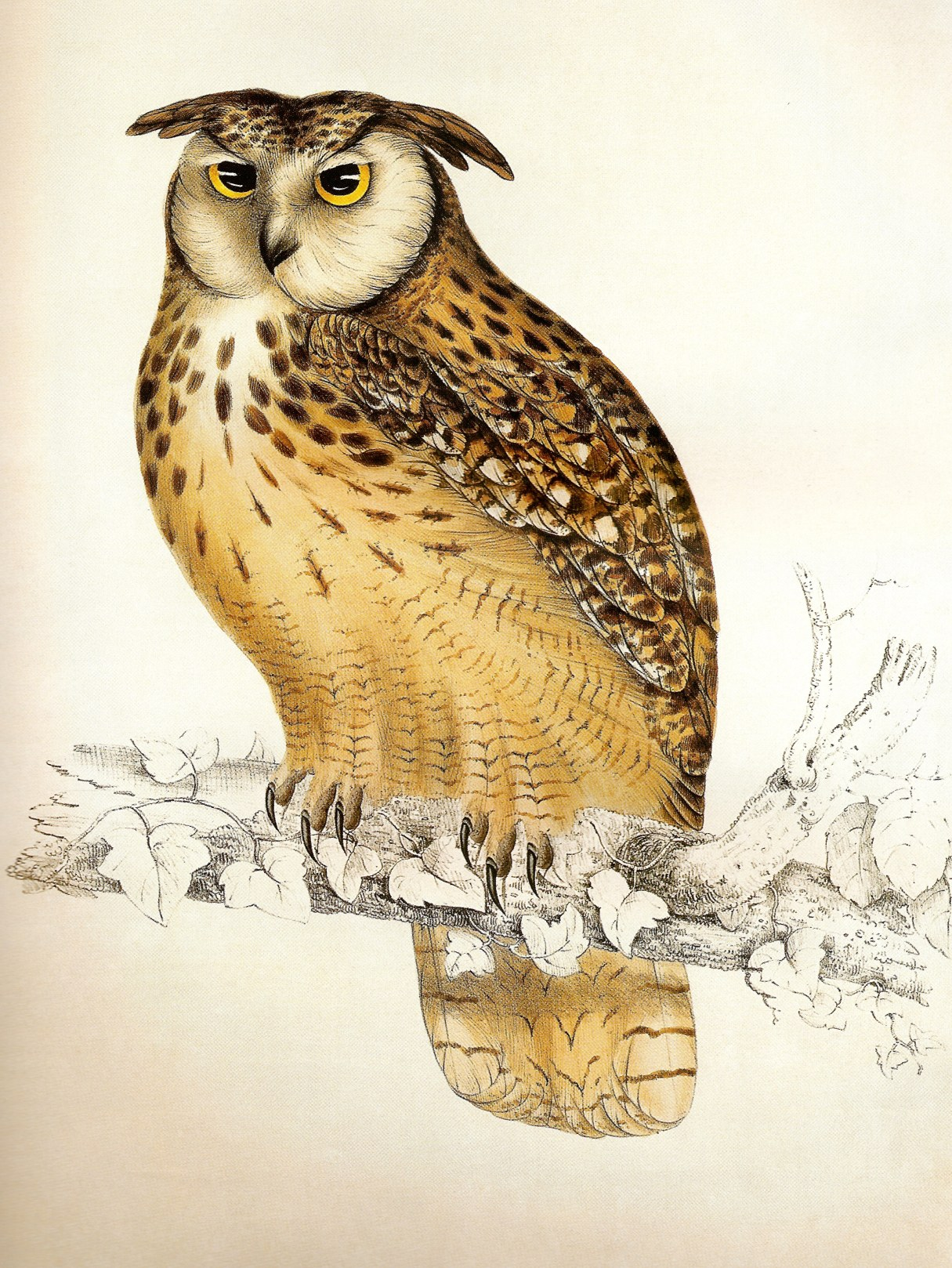

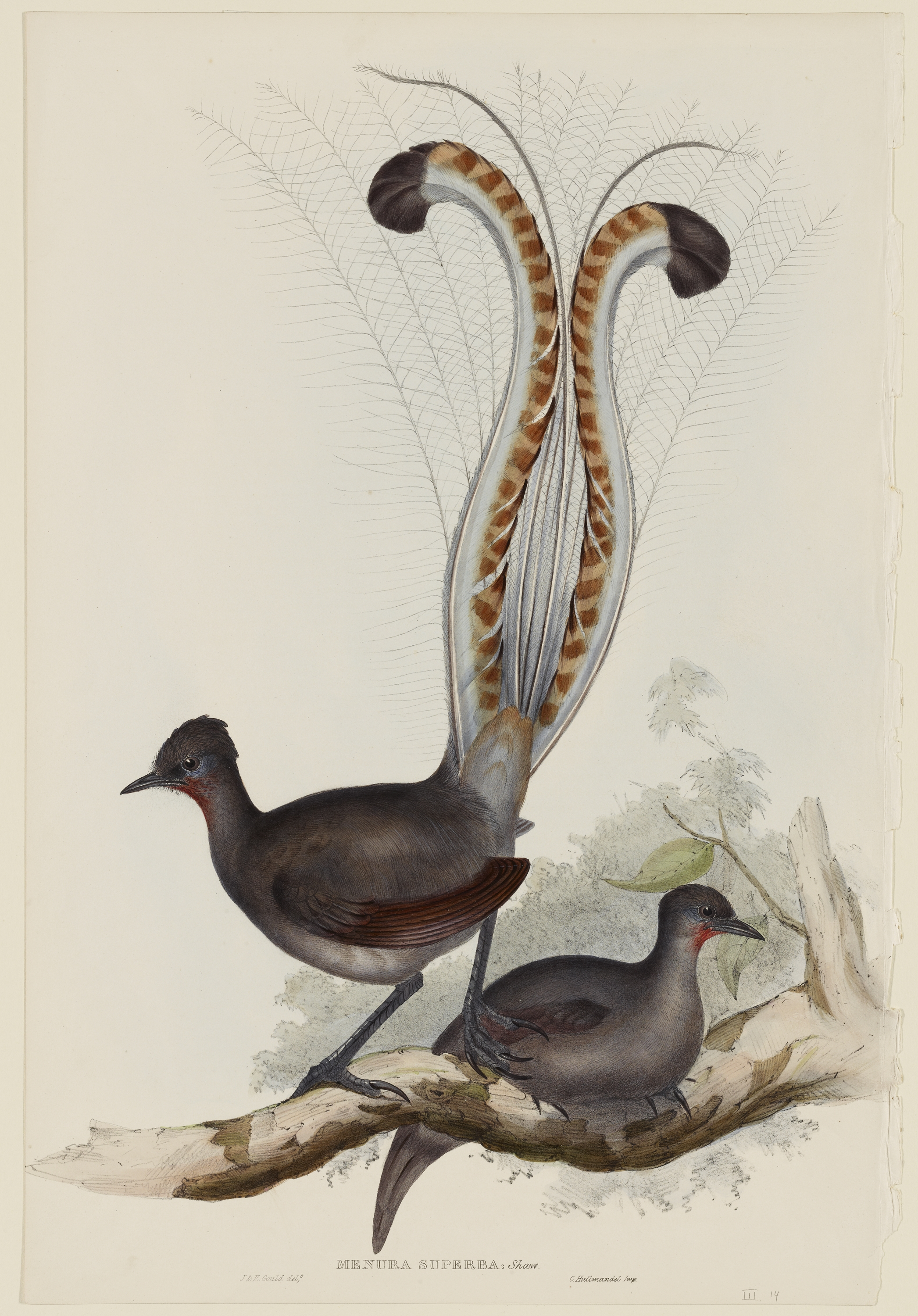

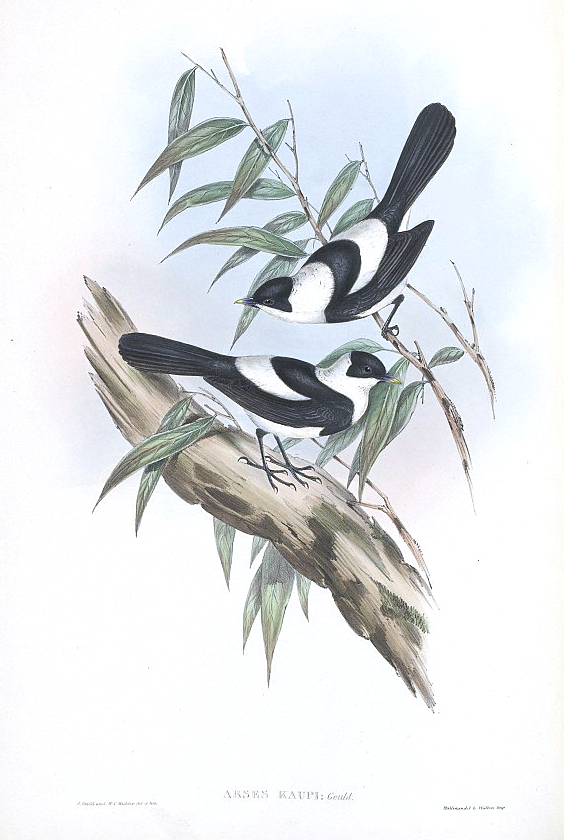

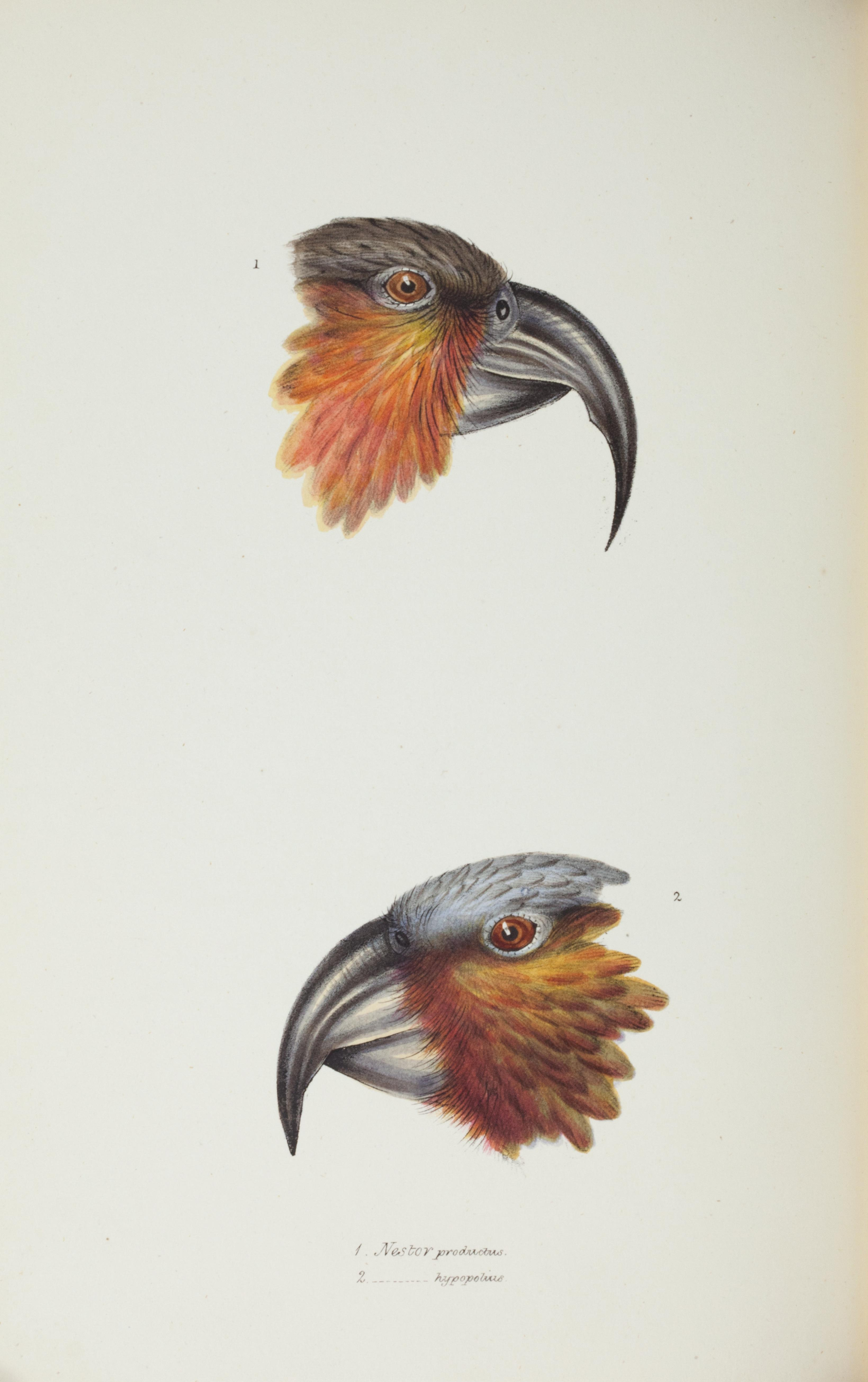

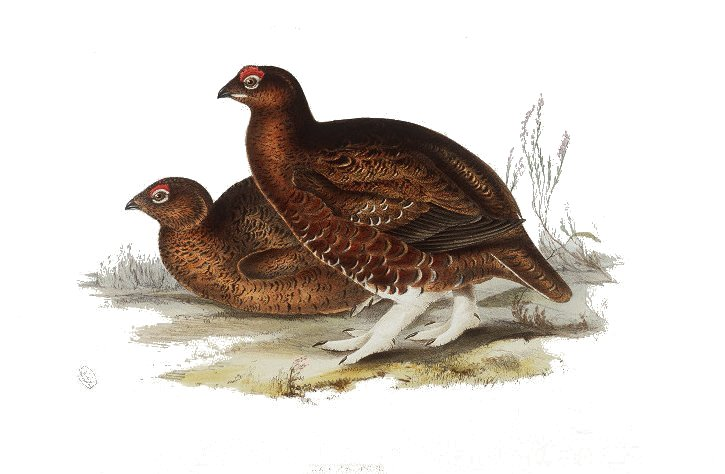

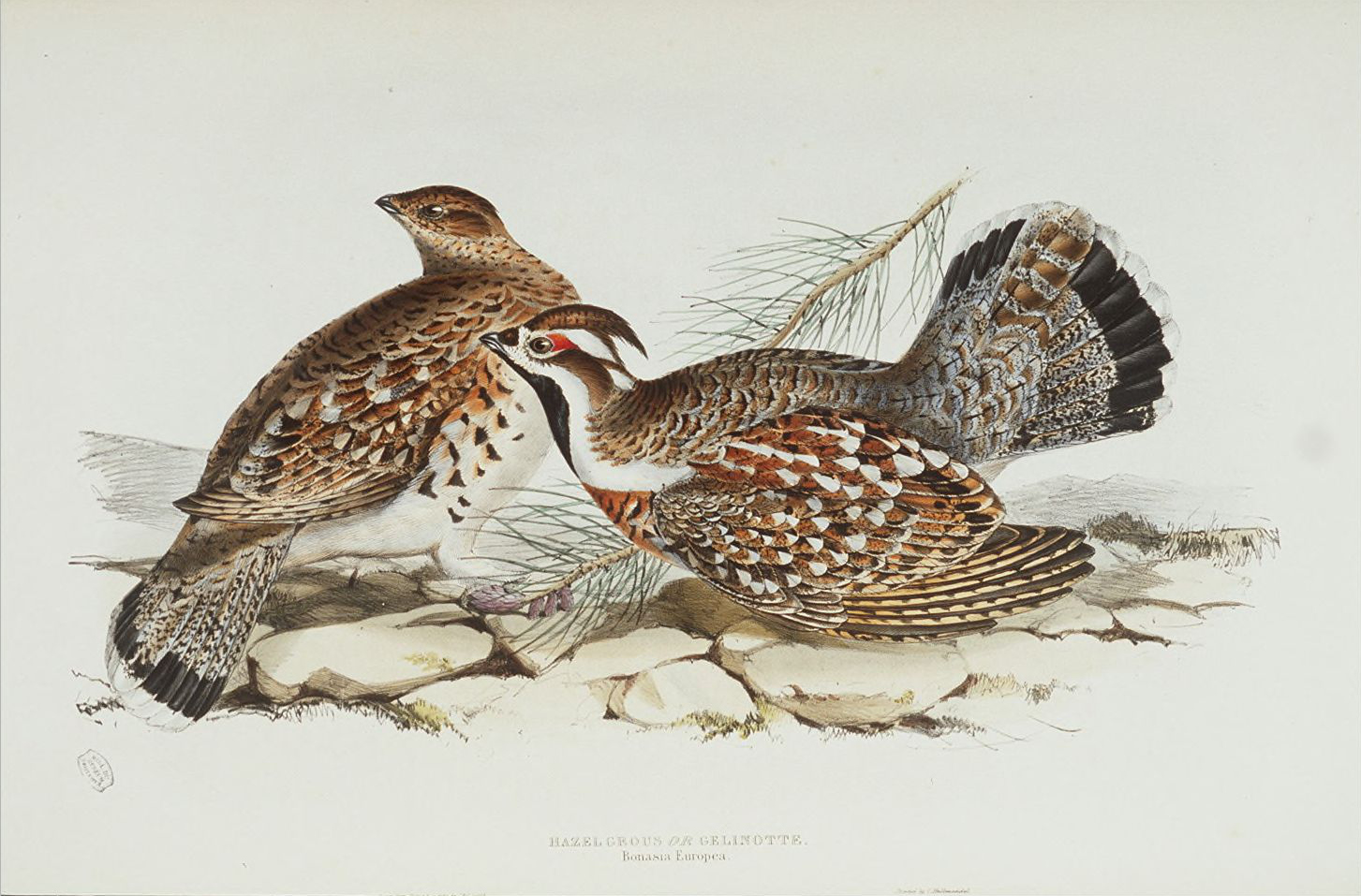

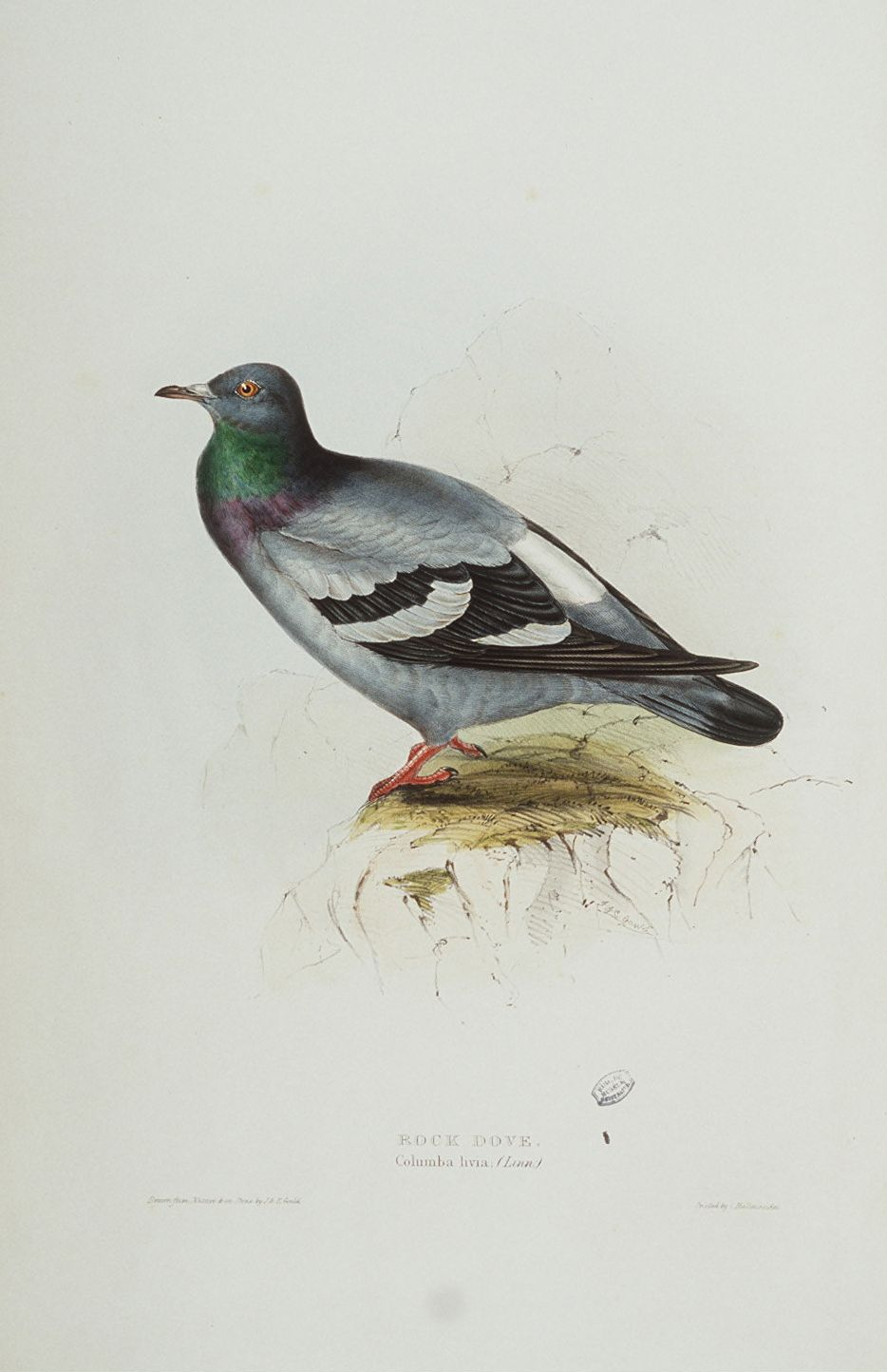

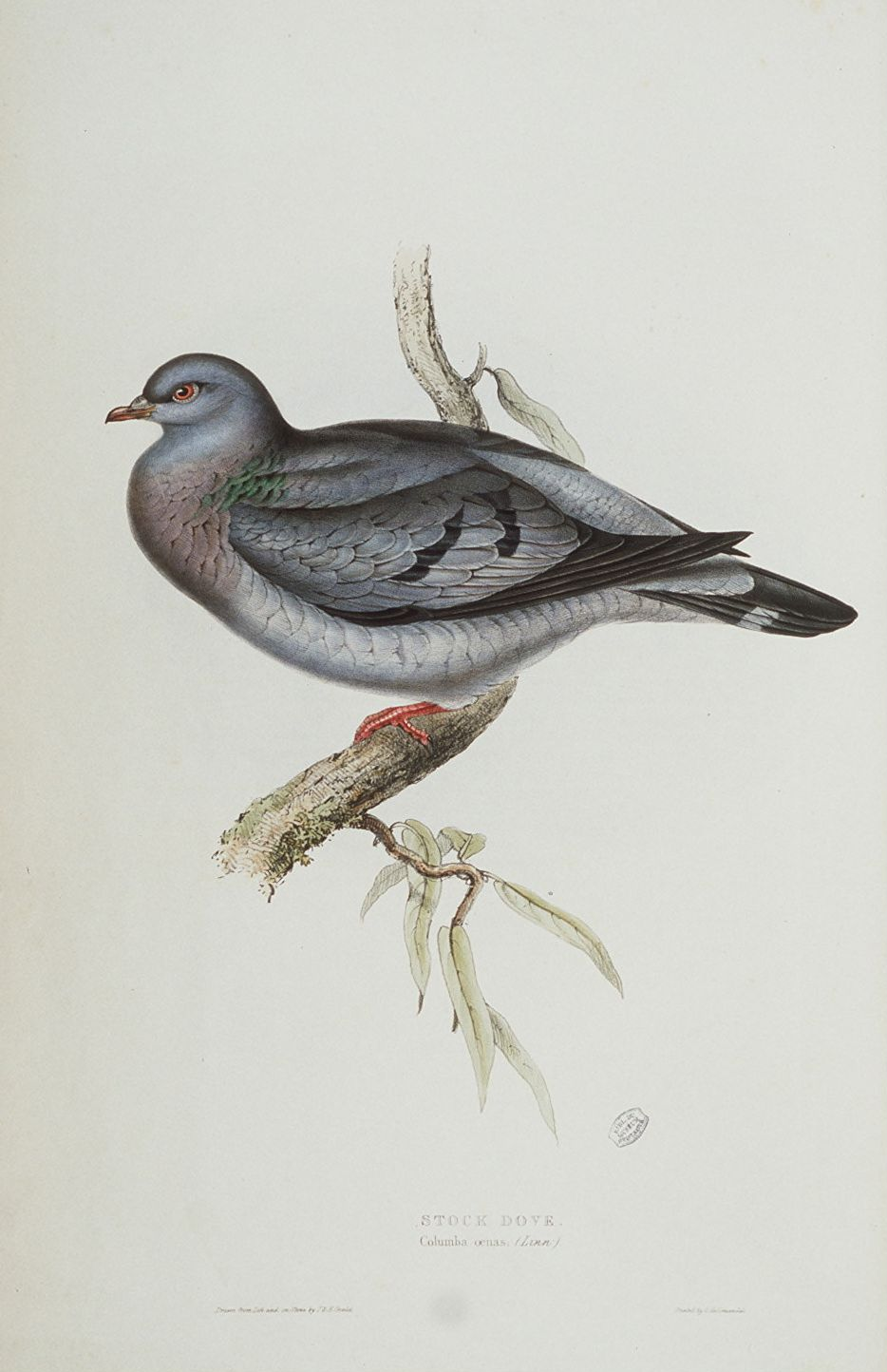

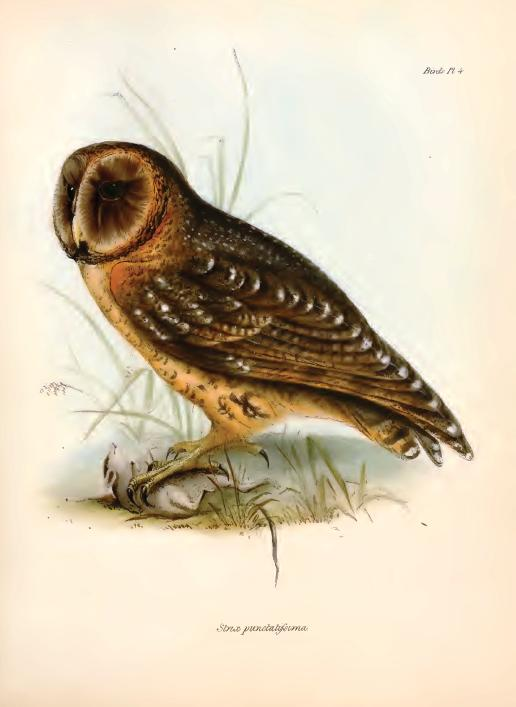

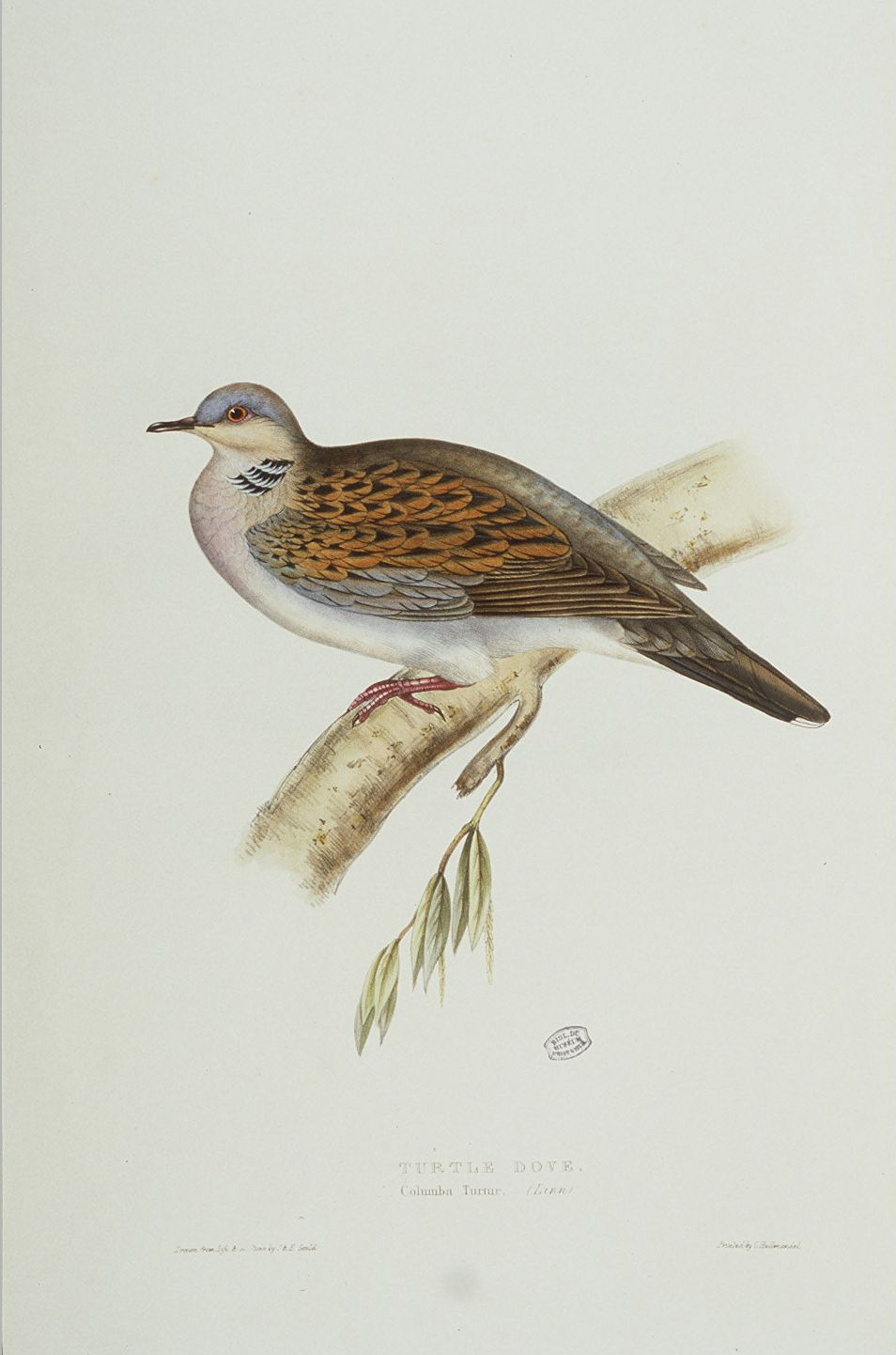

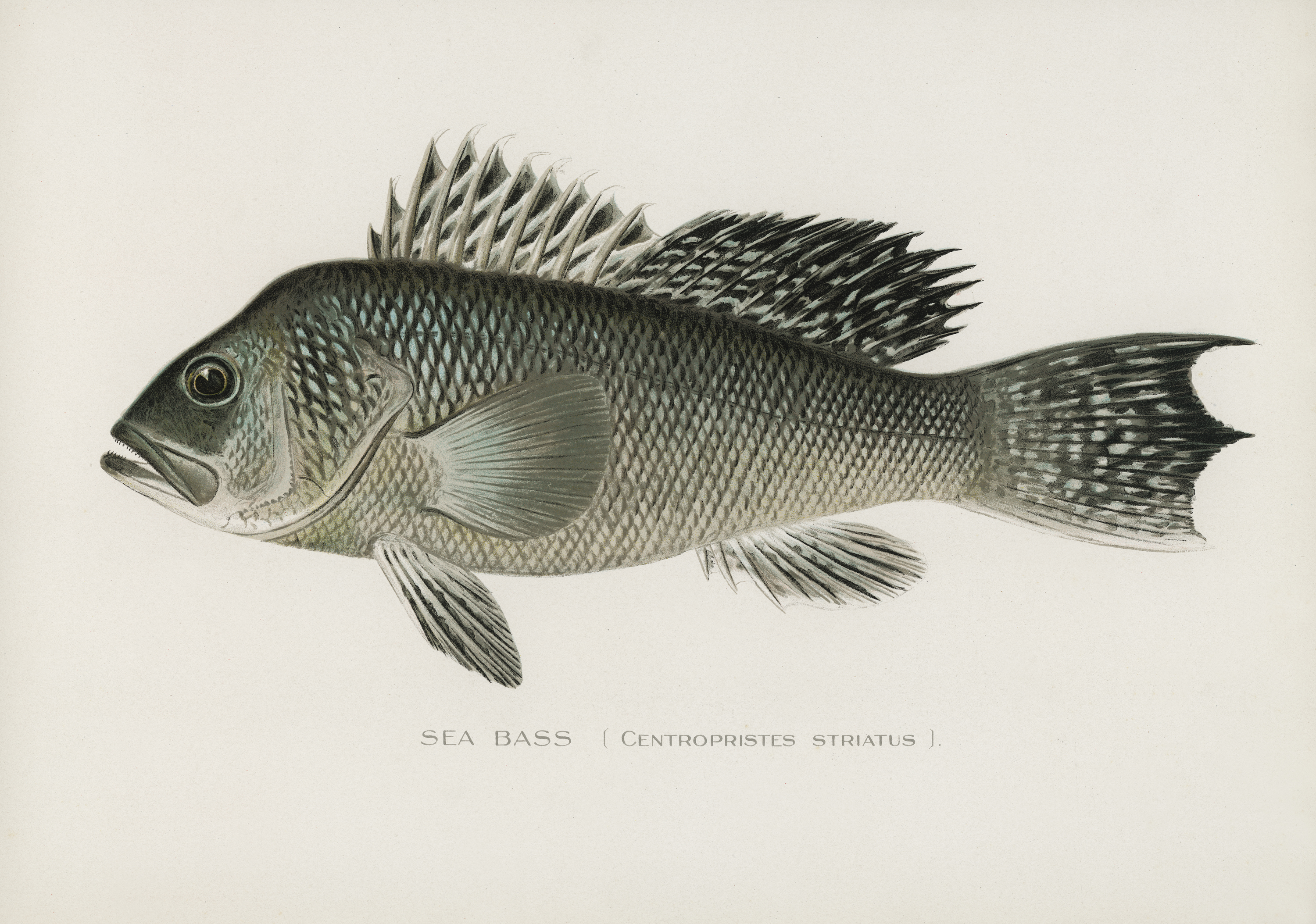

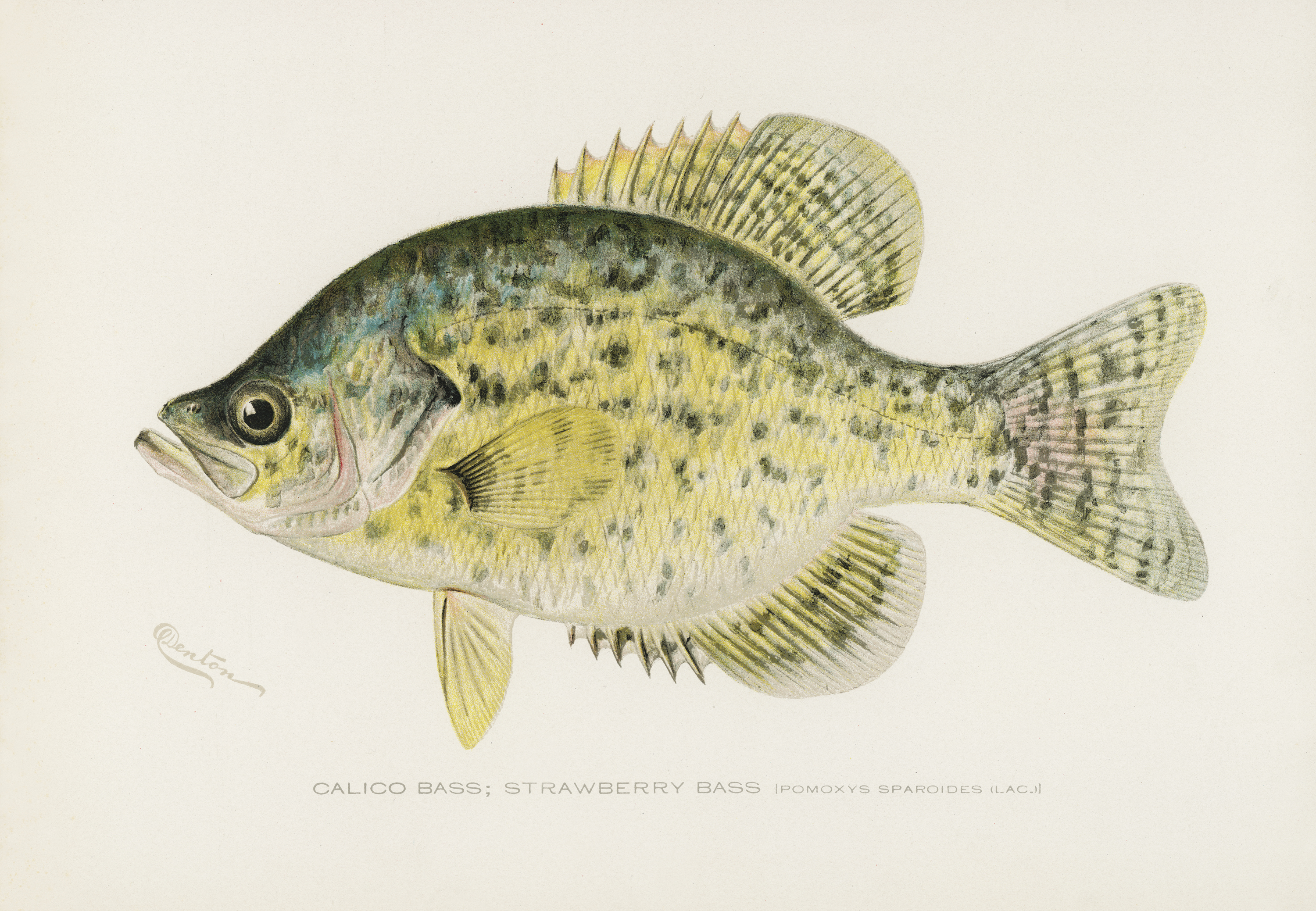

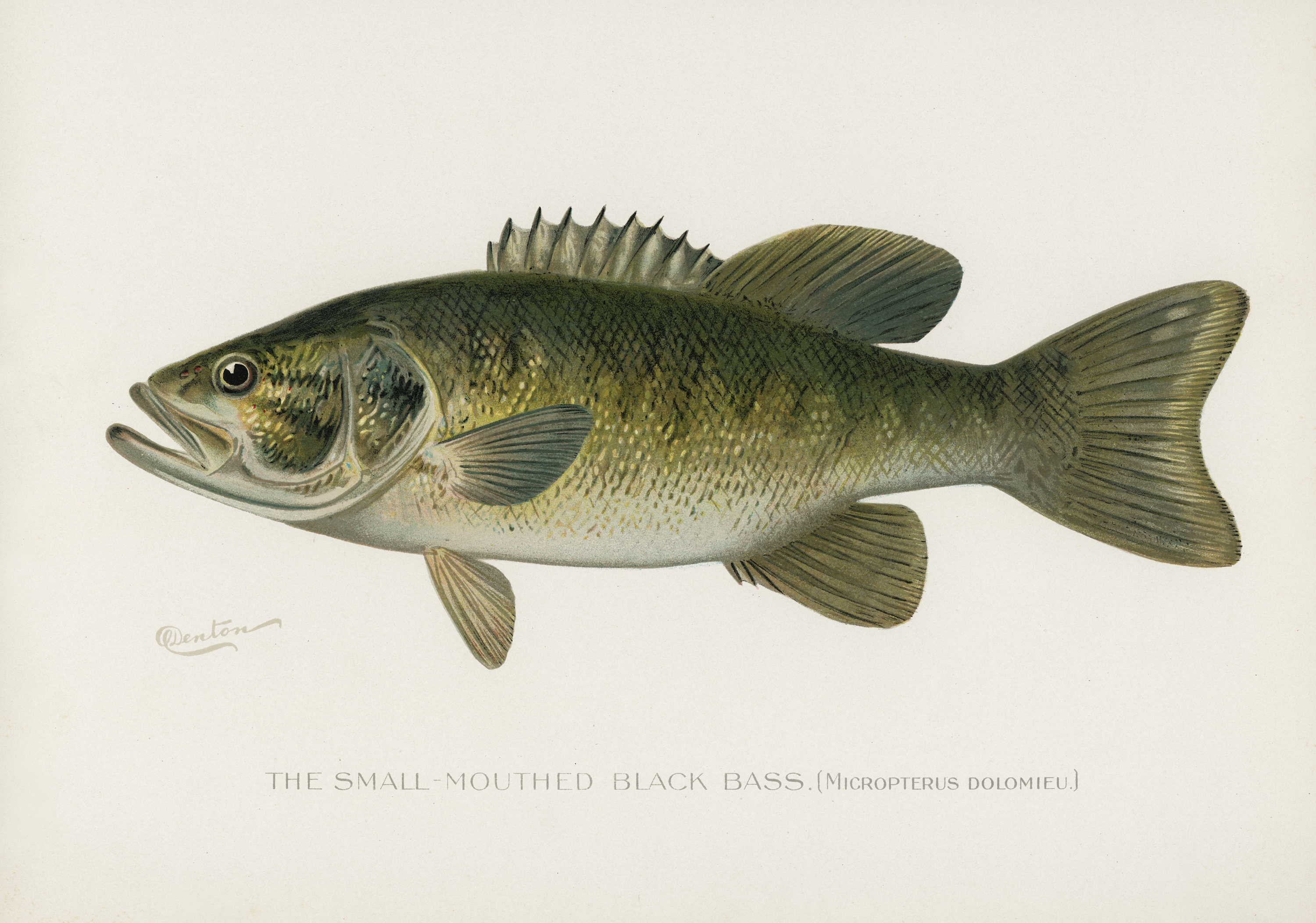

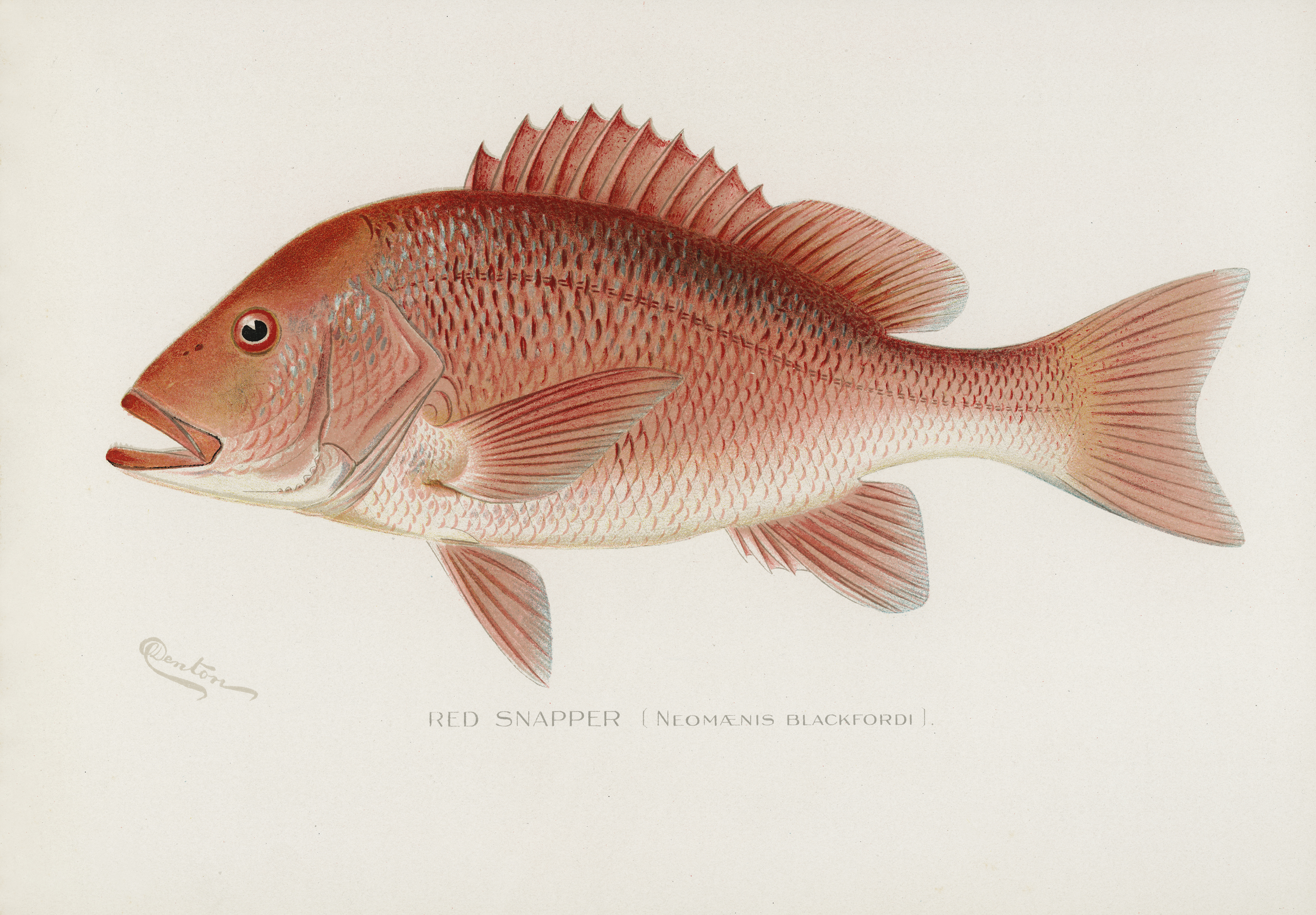

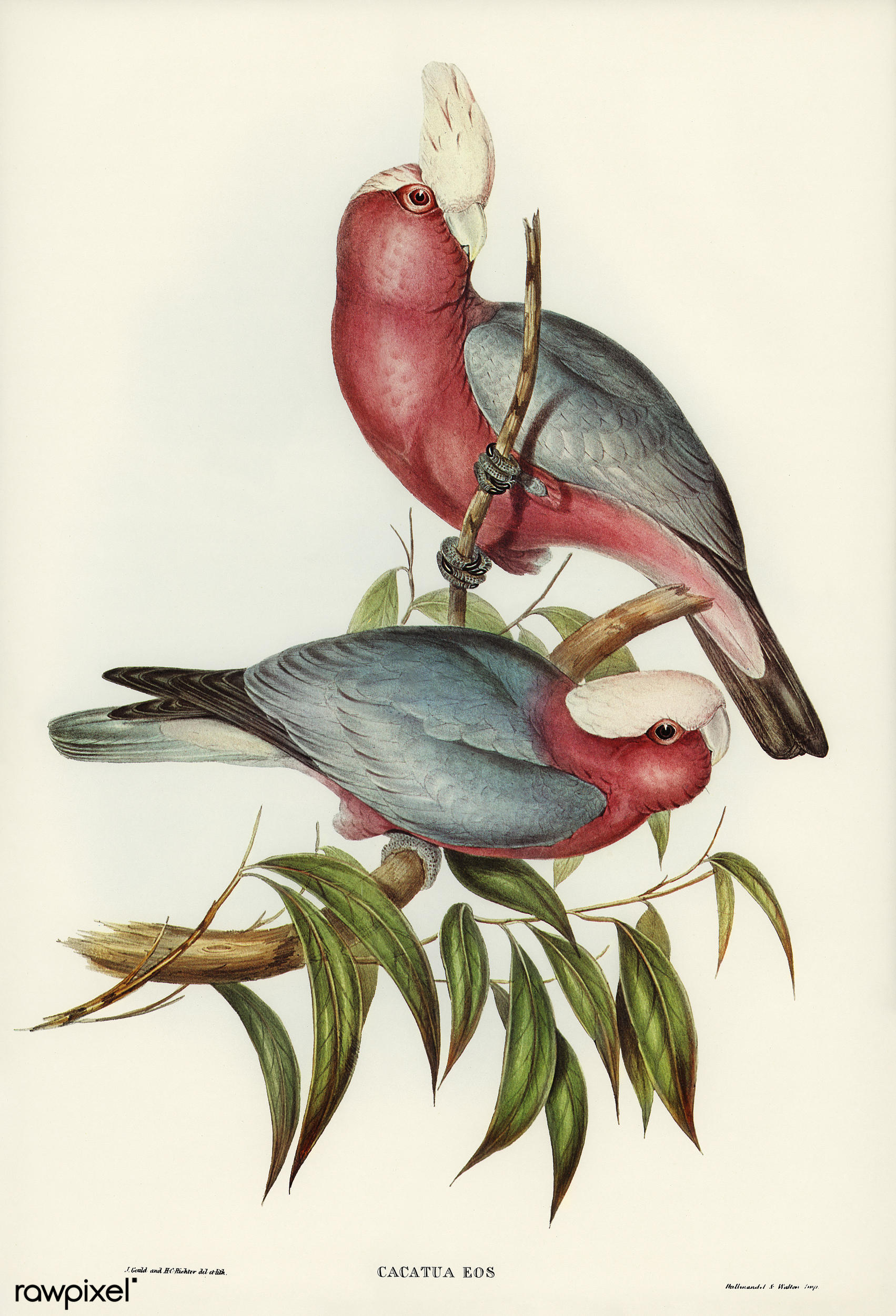
Cacatua Eos (Rose-breasted Cockatoo) illustrated by Elizabeth Gould for John Gould's Birds of Australia

== See also ==
- List of wildlife artists
