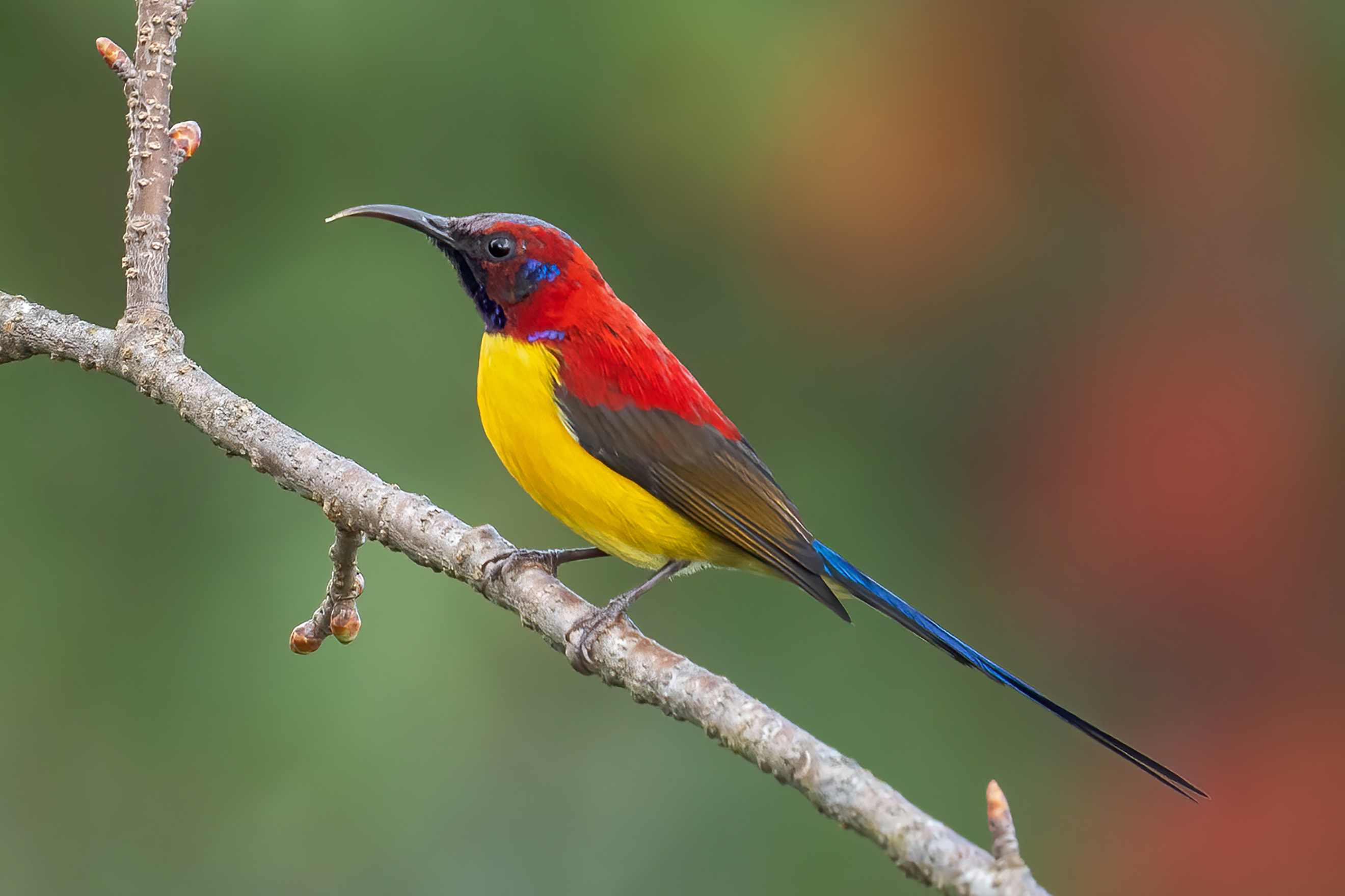
- Aethopyga gouldiae in Nagarkot, Nepal.

Conservation status
- Least Concern (IUCN 3.1)

Scientific classification
- Kingdom: Animalia
- Phylum: Chordata
- Class: Aves
- Order: Passeriformes
- Family: Nectariniidae
- Genus: Aethopyga
- Species: A. gouldiae

Binomial name
- Aethopyga gouldiae (Vigors, 1831)

= Mrs. Gould's sunbird =

Species of bird

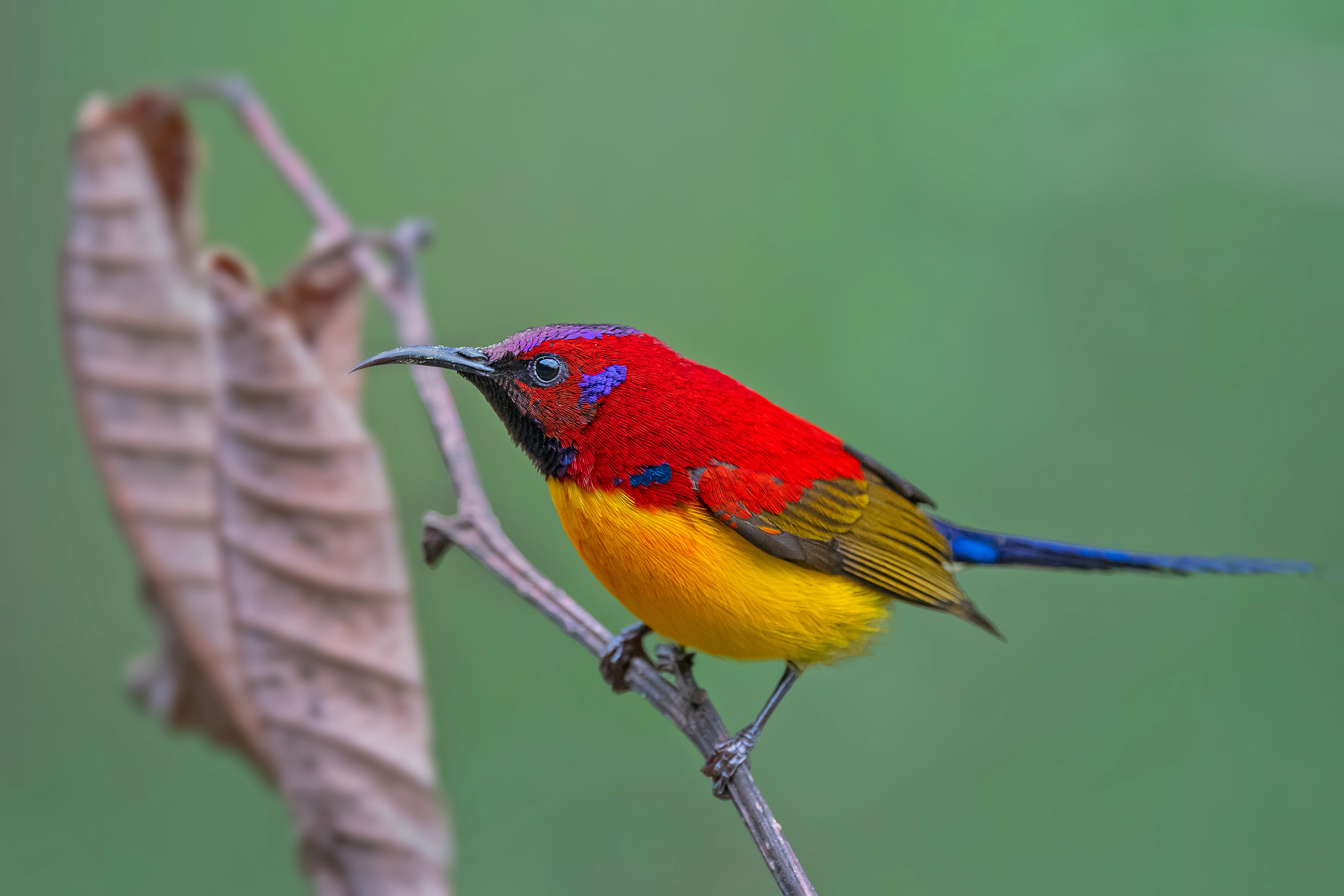
Mrs. Gould's sunbird (Aethopyga gouldiae) clicked at Mandala, Arunachal Pradesh

Mrs. Gould's sunbird (Aethopyga gouldiae) is a sunbird species native to forests and shrublands from the southern foothills of the Himalayas to Southeast Asia.

== Taxonomy ==
Mrs. Gould's sunbird was formally described in 1831 as Cinnyris gouldiae by the Irish zoologist Nicholas Vigors based on a specimen that John Gould had received from India. The specific epithet was chosen to honour the bird artist Elizabeth Gould who had drawn a plate of the bird for publication in the book A Century of Birds from the Himalaya Mountains. Vigors specified the type locality as the Himalayas but this was restricted to the Silma-Almora district (Almora to Shimla in India) by Claud Ticehurst and Hugh Whistler in 1924. Mrs. Gould's sunbird is now one of 21 species placed in the genus Aethopyga that was introduced in 1851 by the German ornithologist Jean Cabanis.

Four subspecies are recognised:

- A. g. gouldiae (Vigors, NA, 1831) – Himalayas (Sutlej Valley to Arunachal Pradesh and southeastern Tibet)
- A. g. isolata Baker, ECS, 1925 – southern Assam to Bangladesh and western Myanmar (Chin Hills)
- A. g. dabryii (Verreaux, JP, 1867) – western China (Xinjiang to Sichuan and Yunnan) to Myanmar and northern Laos
- A. g. annamensis Robinson, HC & Kloss, CB, 1919 – southern Laos (Bolaven Plateau) and southern Vietnam (Langbian Plateau)

The species is regarded as closely related to the green-tailed sunbird.

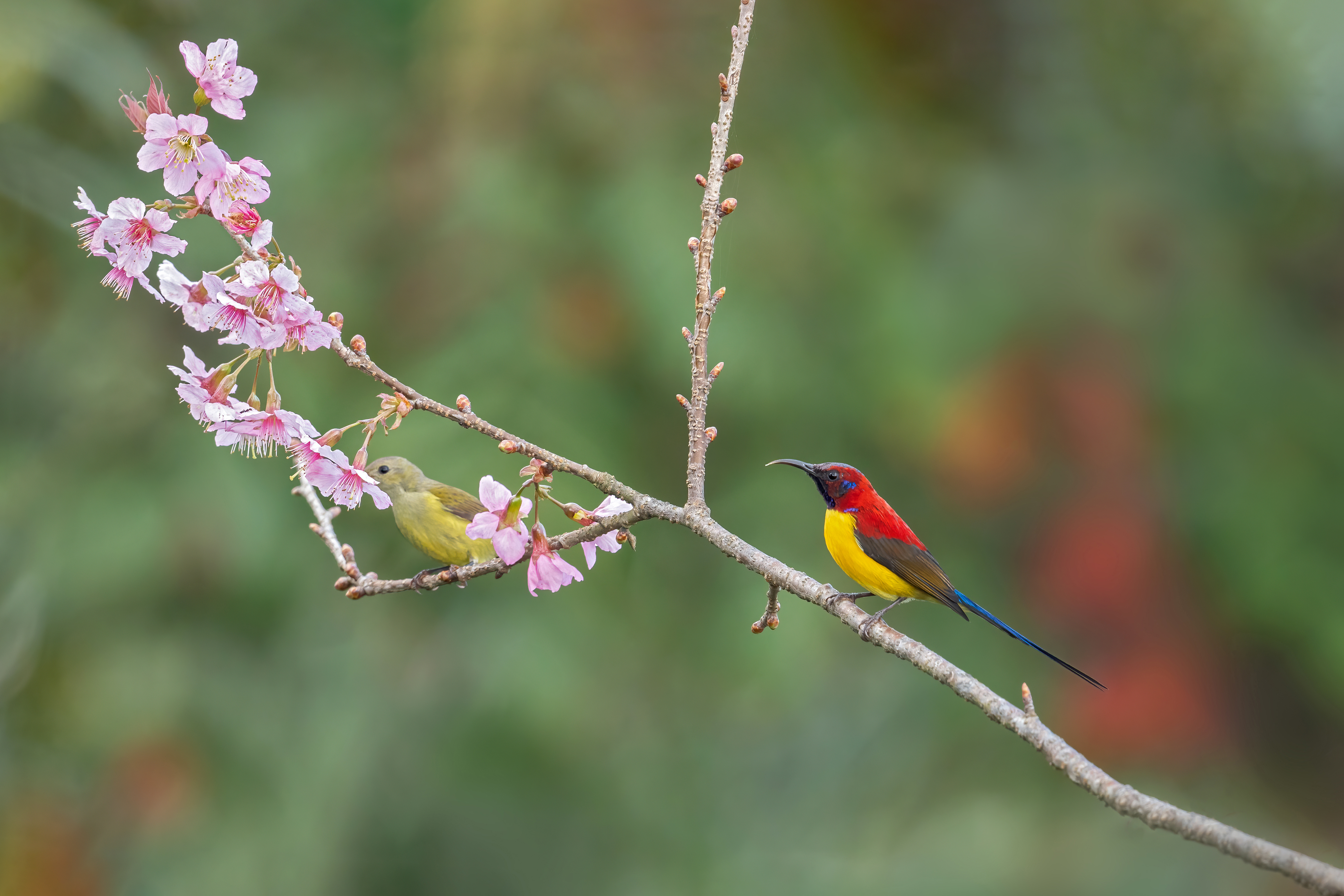
Mrs. Gould's sunbird: male and female together

== Description ==
Mrs. Gould's sunbird is a small sunbird. It has a down-curved and pointed beak, typical for a nectar feeder. The iris of the eye is usually deep brown, and the tarsus is black.

The male Mrs. Gould's sunbird is bright and colourful. The forehead to crown, supercilium and throat of the sunbird are deep violet. The lore, the auriculars and the malar region, the nape, mantle and side are bright red to deep scarlet. Bright blue patterns may be present on the auricular and the side. The coverts and wingbars to the primary feathers are brown or olive green. The belly and vent are yellowish-green. The tail covert is bright blue and fades to dark purple at the tip of the tail.

The female is dull in colour compared to the male. The female is covered by deep olive green on the dorsal side and greyish-yellow on the ventral side.

The colour and pattern may be different in different subspecies. For example, the breast of A. g. dabryii is purely scarlet, and A. g. gouldiae has a bright yellow breast, with or without a red stripe.

The male weighs 4–12 g and measures 131–160 mm; wing length is 51–58 mm, tail length is 64–88mm, and tarsus length is 13–15.5 mm. The female weighs 5–8 g and measures 91–111 mm; wing length is 45–54 mm, tail length is 30.5–40 mm, and tarsus length is 12–16 mm. Both sexes have a beak 13–17 mm in length.

== Distribution and habitat ==
Mrs. Gould's sunbird is widely distributed in Eastern Bangladesh, Bhutan, Laos, Myanmar, Nepal, Northern Thailand, India (from Jammu to Arunachal Pradesh), Pakistan (Margalla Hills), Vietnam and Southern China. It is found in the evergreen broad-leaved forest, monsoon forest and deciduous broad-leaved forest at 1000–3500 m above sea-level. It is also occasionally found in orchards and bamboo forest within its range. There is a non-breeding population in Hong Kong.

== Behaviour and ecology ==
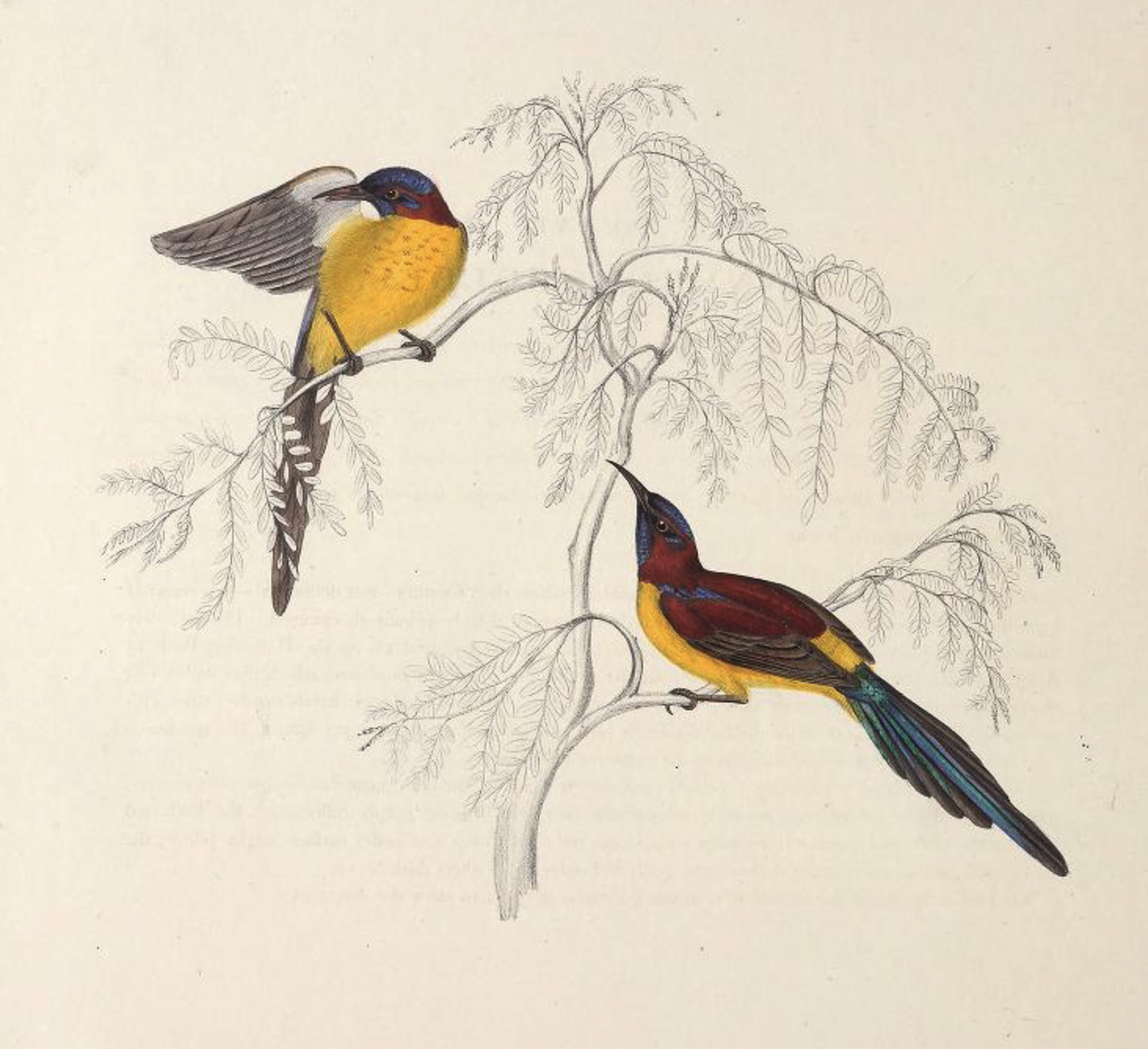
Elizabeth Gould's 1831 illustration of her namesake bird

Mrs. Gould's sunbird is generally resident but may undertake small-scale seasonal migrations. It is usually seen solitary or in pairs although temporary groups of 3–5 or even more than 10 individuals can form. It moves quickly and flies for short distances. Calls include a high thin "tzeeee" and sharp "tzit".

=== Food and feeding ===
As a typical sunbird, Mrs. Gould's sunbird feeds on nectar. The elongated and tubular tongue is modified for sucking the nectar from tube-shape flowers. It also takes small invertebrates. Diet in Sichuan and Yunnan was found to include spiders, small beetles and hemipteran nymphs.

=== Breeding ===
The breeding period of Mrs. Gould's sunbird is April to June. Females nest around mid-April. The nest is built of moss, grass, plant fibres and spiderwebs. It is 15–18 cm long and 10–11.5 cm wide, and usually built in deciduous broad-leaved forest at 1000–3000m above sea level. In the breeding season, the males court the females with a mating call "zhai-zhai-zhai". Clutch size is 2–3 eggs. The eggs are white and usually have reddish brown spots. Incubation lasts for about two weeks, and chicks fledge after 15–16 days. In this period, both parents care for the chicks. The adults feed nectar to the young chicks by regurgitation at the beginning; later on invertebrates are increasingly provided.

== Status and conservation ==
The species is listed as Least Concern in the IUCN Red List. It is not on the list of endangered and protected species of China. However, it is on the List of Wild Animals Protected by the PRC that Are Beneficial or of High Value to Economy and Science.
