= Handbook to the Birds of Australia =

Book by John Gould

- Title page for Handbook to the Birds of Australia (1865)
- Author: John Gould
- Language: English
- Subject: Australian birds
- Genre: Zoology
- Publisher: Author: London
- Publication date: 1865
- Media type: Print (hardcover)
- Pages: xxiv + 636 (vol.1), 630 (vol.2)

The Handbook to the Birds of Australia is a two-volume work published in London in 1865 by the author John Gould. It was published in octavo format (250 x 170 mm), containing some 1290 pages, bound in green cloth with gilt lyrebirds on the front covers and with decorated gilt spines. The two volumes are separately paginated and include no illustrations. It is essentially a revision and update of the text originally published with Gould's monumental illustrated folio The Birds of Australia, which was published in seven volumes between 1840 and 1848. The author says in his Preface:

Nearly twenty years have elapsed since my folio work on the Birds of Australia was completed. During that period many new species have been discovered, and much additional information acquired respecting those comprised therein; consequently it appeared to me that a careful résumé of the entire subject would be acceptable to the possessors of the former edition, as well as to the many persons in Australia who are now turning their attention to the ornithology of the country in which they are resident. Indeed I have been assured that such a work is greatly needed to enable the explorer during his journeyings, or the student in his quiet home, to identify the species that may come under his notice, and as a means by which the curators of the museums now established in the various colonies may arrange and name the collections intrusted to their charge. With these views the present Handbook has been prepared.

In 1972 Lansdowne Editions published a facsimile reprint of the Handbook, with the two volumes bound in one, including a foreword (“A Note on the Handbook”) by Allan McEvey, Curator of Birds at the National Museum of Victoria, as well as a biographical note on John Gould by John Currey. In his foreword McEvey says:

The essential status of the Handbook emerges from its historical position; it looks back to the beginning of Australian ornithology, summarizing the known, and forward to the great Catalogue by Sharpe and others, and to the Australian works of Ramsay, Campbell, North and Mathews. From this transitional point it provides the present-day worker with an invaluable link between the early and the recent. Here will be found the familiar quote, (e.g. on the strength of Shrike-tit mandibles), the elusive reference, (e.g. an early note on the possible breaking of Emu’s eggs by the Buzzard), and many an easily over-looked observation (e.g. the remarks on the flight of the Owlet-nightjar). If one sees the text in historical perspective and reads critically (e.g. Gould’s comments on the nesting sites of pardalotes are inadequate) it may generally be said that the Handbook entry offers the best starting-point for the serious gathering of information on any particular Australian species.

But in addition to the extraordinary amount of good observation it records, and to its plentiful snippets of ornithological and, indeed, Australian history, the Handbook offers pleasing samples of natural history prose of the nineteenth century which, verbose or not, reflect the dignity that the age expected of its science. It is true that Gould broadly speaking, was deaf to the song of Australian birds, but this probably shows the subjectiveness of nationality rather than a lack of appreciative ability. He was an Englishman, attuned to a mellow countryside and a seasonal bird-song, now in an arid land, looking – and listening – for ornithological differences. The Murray Scrub (mallee) was a far cry from Dorset, and 26 Charlotte Street; he heard little that stimulated nostalgic affection; and one does not become an Australian in two years But he was not insensitive and his various comments illustrate both his inevitable limitation and his response to the aesthetic.
