= The Birds of Australia (Gould) =

Book written by John Gould and published in seven volumes

- First volume book cover
- Author: John Gould
- Language: English
- Published: 1840 to 1848
- No. of books: 7
- Followed by: Handbook to the Birds of Australia

The Birds of Australia is a book written by John Gould and published in seven volumes between 1840 and 1848, with a supplement published between 1851 and 1869. It was the first comprehensive survey of the birds of Australia and included descriptions of 681 species, 328 of which were new to Western science and were first described by Gould.

== History ==
Gould and his wife Elizabeth née Coxen travelled to Australia from England in 1838 to prepare the book. They spent a little under two years collecting specimens for the book. John travelled widely and made extensive collections of Australian birds and other fauna. Elizabeth, who had illustrated several of his earlier works, made hundreds of drawings from specimens for publication in The Birds of Australia.

The plates of the book were produced by lithography, and hand-coloured by Gabriel Bayfield's studio. Elizabeth produced 84 plates before she died in 1841, Edward Lear produced one, Benjamin Waterhouse Hawkins contributed one and the remaining 595 plates were produced by H. C. Richter from Elizabeth's drawings and were published under his name. The accompanying letterpress descriptions of the birds are authored by John Gould and were printed by the firm R. & J. E. Taylor.

Birds of Australia was issued in parts to subscribers - in all there were 250 subscribers, and so 250 sets of the seven-volume work were printed. A complete sets of original volumes sold at auction in 1996 for more than A$350,000. It was published in a folio format that measures 57cm in height. Of the original 250, 175 of those are now accounted for in institutional collections, and the remaining 75 are in private hands or have been broken up to be sold as individual prints.

The work was preceded by Gould's A Synopsis of the Birds of Australia, intended as a promotion for the sale of subscriptions to the larger work. The coloured plates included montages of birds heads, crops of illustrations by Elizabeth Gould or artwork that Gould purchased from Edward Lear. Lear sold illustrations he had not included in his celebrated works to Gould, such as Illustrations of the Family of Psittacidae, or Parrots, and Gould in turn printed the images in reverse and amongst the works of other artists; the lack of attribution to Lear and others is thought to have been Gould's assumption of authorship by his purchase of their works.

In 1865 Gould published a revised and updated version of the text of The Birds of Australia in the two-volume Handbook to the Birds of Australia.
