= A Century of Birds from the Himalaya Mountains =

Ornithological book by John Gould

Book document

A Century of Birds from the Himalaya Mountains is an ornithological book published by John Gould between 1830 and 1832.

John Gould was working as a taxidermist at the museum of the Zoological Society of London, curating and preserving animal bodies for display or study. When a number of taxidermied birds from the Himalaya Mountains arrived at the society, Gould decided to publish a book describing them.

The text was written by Gould's friend and mentor Nicholas Aylward Vigors.

The images of the birds were produced using the process of lithography. They were sketched by Gould himself, and drawn and transferred onto stones by Gould’s wife, artist Elizabeth Gould. She worked with Edward Lear to do this. Lear published his own Illustrations of the Family of Psittacidae, or Parrots around the same time. It is said that Gould was inspired by Lear's work. Elizabeth Gould continued to produce drawings for ornithological books until her death in 1841.

A publisher could not be found, and Gould made the decision to publish it himself. The book was printed in stages and issued in 20 monthly parts between 1830 and 1832. The printer was Charles Joseph Hullmandel.
