= Zoology of the Voyage of H.M.S. Beagle =

1838–1843 work edited by Charles Darwin

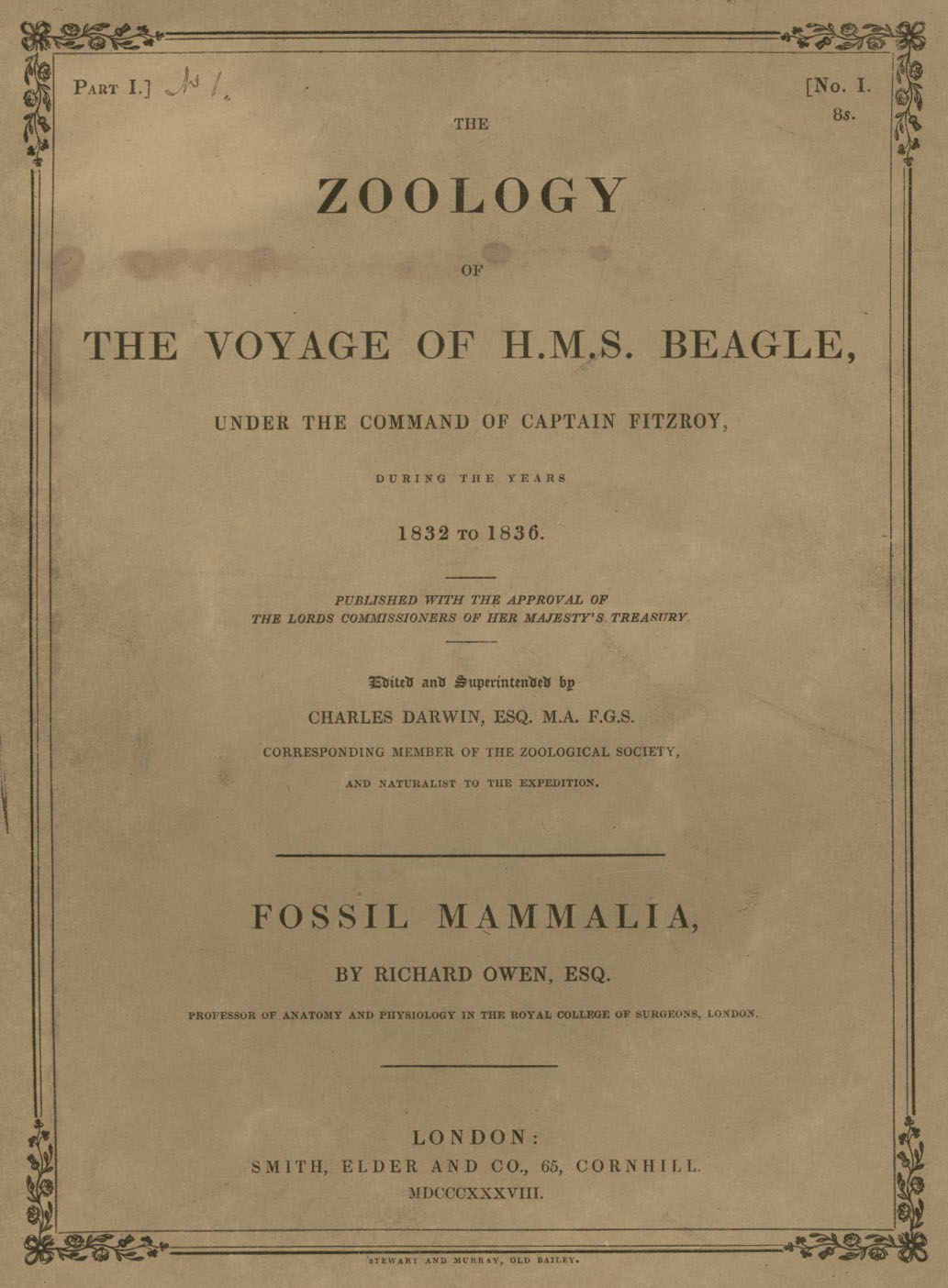
- Part 1. Cover
- Editor: Charles Darwin
- Language: English
- Subject: Zoology
- Published: February 1838 to October 1843
- Media type: Print
- Dewey Decimal: 508.1814
- Text: Zoology of the Voyage of H.M.S. Beagle at Wikisource

The Zoology of the Voyage of H.M.S. Beagle Under the Command of Captain Fitzroy, R.N., during the Years 1832 to 1836 is a 5-part book published unbound in nineteen numbers as they were ready, between February 1838 and October 1843. It was written by various authors, and edited and superintended by Charles Darwin, publishing expert descriptions of the collections he had made during the Beagle voyage.

- Part 1. Fossil Mammalia (1838 – 1840), by Richard Owen (Preface and Geological introduction by Darwin)
- Part 2. Mammalia (1838 – 1839), by George R. Waterhouse (Geographical introduction and A notice of their habits and ranges by Darwin)

Darwin also contributed notices of habits and ranges throughout the text of Mammalia and Birds, and the text of the Fish and the Reptiles included numerous notes by him that were mostly taken from his labels. The authors of these parts were as follows:

- Part 3. Birds (1838 – 1841), by John Gould
- Part 4. Fish (1840 – 1842), by Leonard Jenyns
- Part 5. Reptiles (1842 – 1843), by Thomas Bell

For a small additional fee the publishers sold the completed work bound, in five volumes, and later bound in three volumes, the first incorporating Parts 1 & 2, the second Part 3 and the third Parts 4 & 5. An example of this arrangement can be seen in the catalogue entry for the copies held at the State Library of New South Wales. The copies published by Elder Smith, 1840-1843 has the five volumes bound into three with some plates folded.
