= John Gould =

English ornithologist (1804–1881)

John Gould FRS
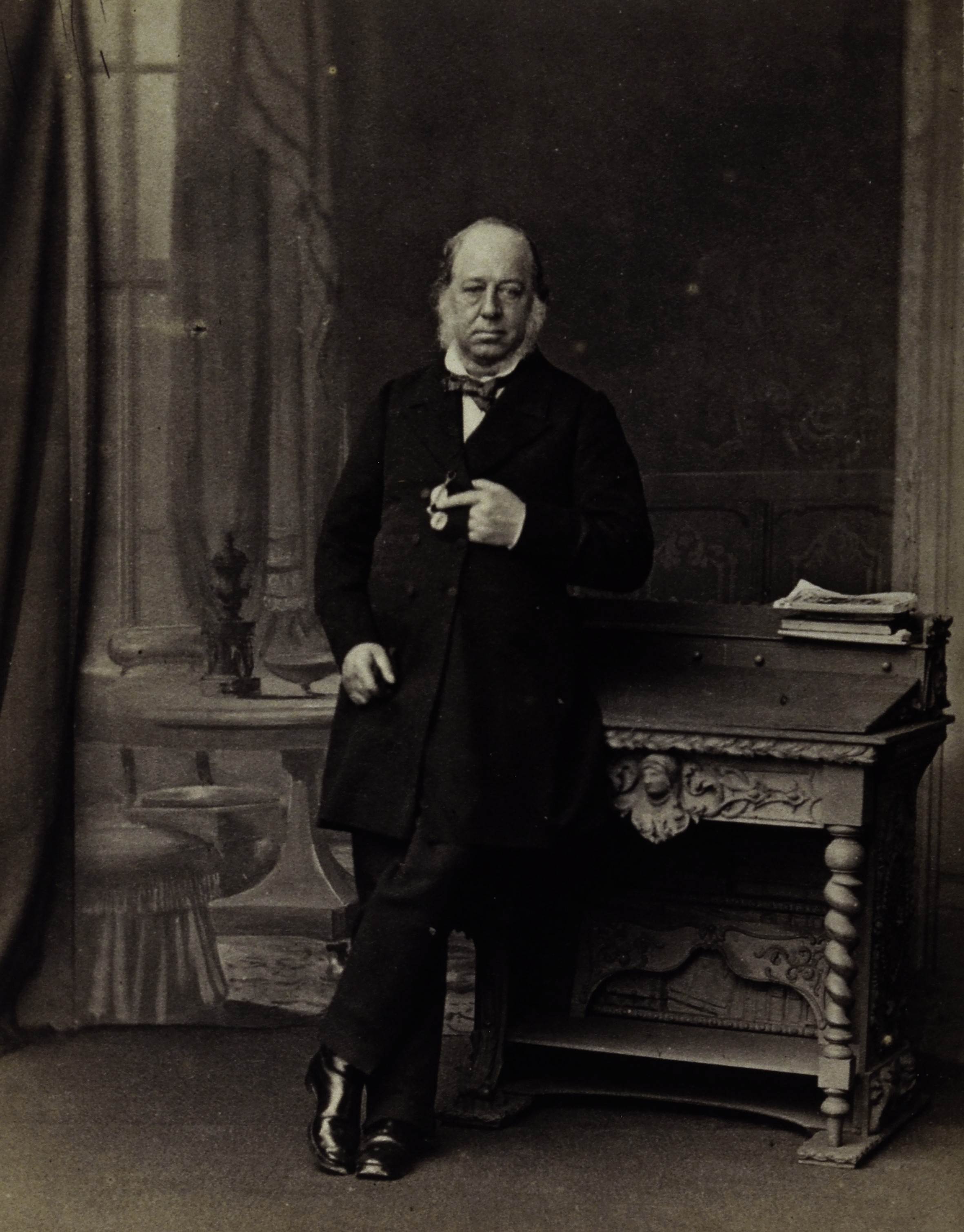
- Gould c. 1860
- Born: 14 September 1804; Lyme Regis, England
- Died: 3 February 1881 (aged 76); London, England
- Resting place: Kensal Green cemetery
- Known for: Illustrated monographs on birds, identification of Darwin's finches
- Spouse: Elizabeth Coxen
- Children: Charles Gould
- Scientific career
- Fields: Ornithology
- Workplaces: Zoological Society of London
- Author abbrev. (zoology): Gould

John Gould FRS (/ɡuːld/; 14 September 1804 – 3 February 1881) was an English ornithologist who published monographs on birds, illustrated by plates produced by his wife, Elizabeth Gould, and several other artists, including Edward Lear, Henry Constantine Richter, Joseph Wolf and William Matthew Hart. Because of his 1840s seven-volume series The Birds of Australia and its updates he has been considered the father of bird study in Australia, and the Gould League in Australia is named after him. His identification of the birds now nicknamed "Darwin's finches" played a role in the inception of Darwin's theory of evolution by natural selection. Gould's work is referenced in Charles Darwin's book On the Origin of Species.

== Early life ==
John Gould was born in Lyme Regis, Dorset, England, the first son of a gardener. Both father and son probably had little education. After working on Dowager Lady Poulett's glass house, his father obtained a position on an estate near Guildford, Surrey. In 1818, Gould Snr became foreman in the Royal Gardens of Windsor. Gould became an apprentice for 6 years under the care of J. T. Aiton, of the Royal Gardens of Windsor from the age of 14 to 20 years old. The young Gould started training as a gardener. Employed under his father at Windsor from 1818 to 1824, he was then a gardener at Ripley Castle in Yorkshire. He became an expert in the art of taxidermy. In 1824 he set himself up in business in London as a taxidermist. His skill helped him to become the first curator and preserver at the museum of the Zoological Society of London in 1827.

== Research and works published ==
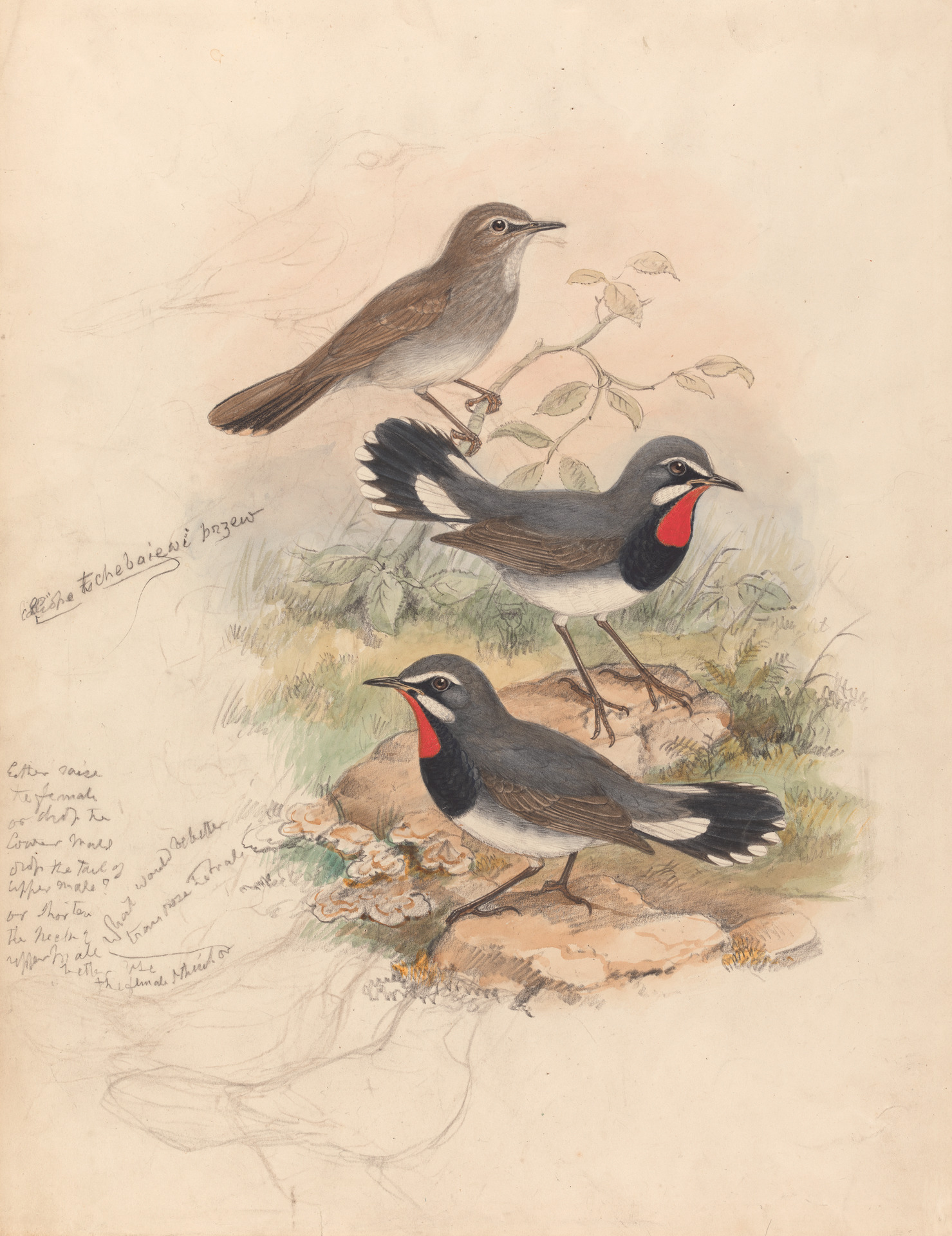
Calliope tschebaiewi Przew (Thrush Family) by John Gould

Gould's position brought him into contact with the country's leading naturalists. This meant that he was often the first to see new collections of birds given to the Zoological Society of London. In 1830 a collection of birds arrived from the Himalayas, many not previously described. Gould published these birds in A Century of Birds from the Himalaya Mountains (1830–1832). The text was by Nicholas Aylward Vigors and the illustrations were drawn and lithographed by Gould's wife Elizabeth Coxen Gould. Most of Gould's work were rough sketches on paper from which other artists created the lithographic plates.

This work was followed by four more in the next seven years, including Birds of Europe in five volumes. It was completed in 1837; Gould wrote the text, and his clerk, Edwin Prince, did the editing. The plates were drawn and lithographed by Elizabeth Coxen Gould. A few of the illustrations were made by Edward Lear as part of his Illustrations of the Family of Psittacidae in 1832. Lear, however, was in financial difficulty, and he sold the entire set of lithographs to Gould. The books were published in a very large size, imperial folio, with magnificent coloured plates. Eventually 41 of these volumes were published, with about 3000 plates. They appeared in parts at £3 3s. a number, subscribed for in advance, and in spite of the heavy expense of preparing the plates, Gould succeeded in making his ventures pay, realising a fortune. This was a busy period for Gould who also published Icones Avium in two parts containing 18 leaves of bird studies on 54 cm plates as a supplement to his previous works. No further monographs were published as in 1838 he and his wife moved to Australia to work on the Birds of Australia. Shortly after their return to England, his wife died in 1841. Elizabeth Gould completed 84 plates for Birds of Australia before her death.

== Work with Darwin ==
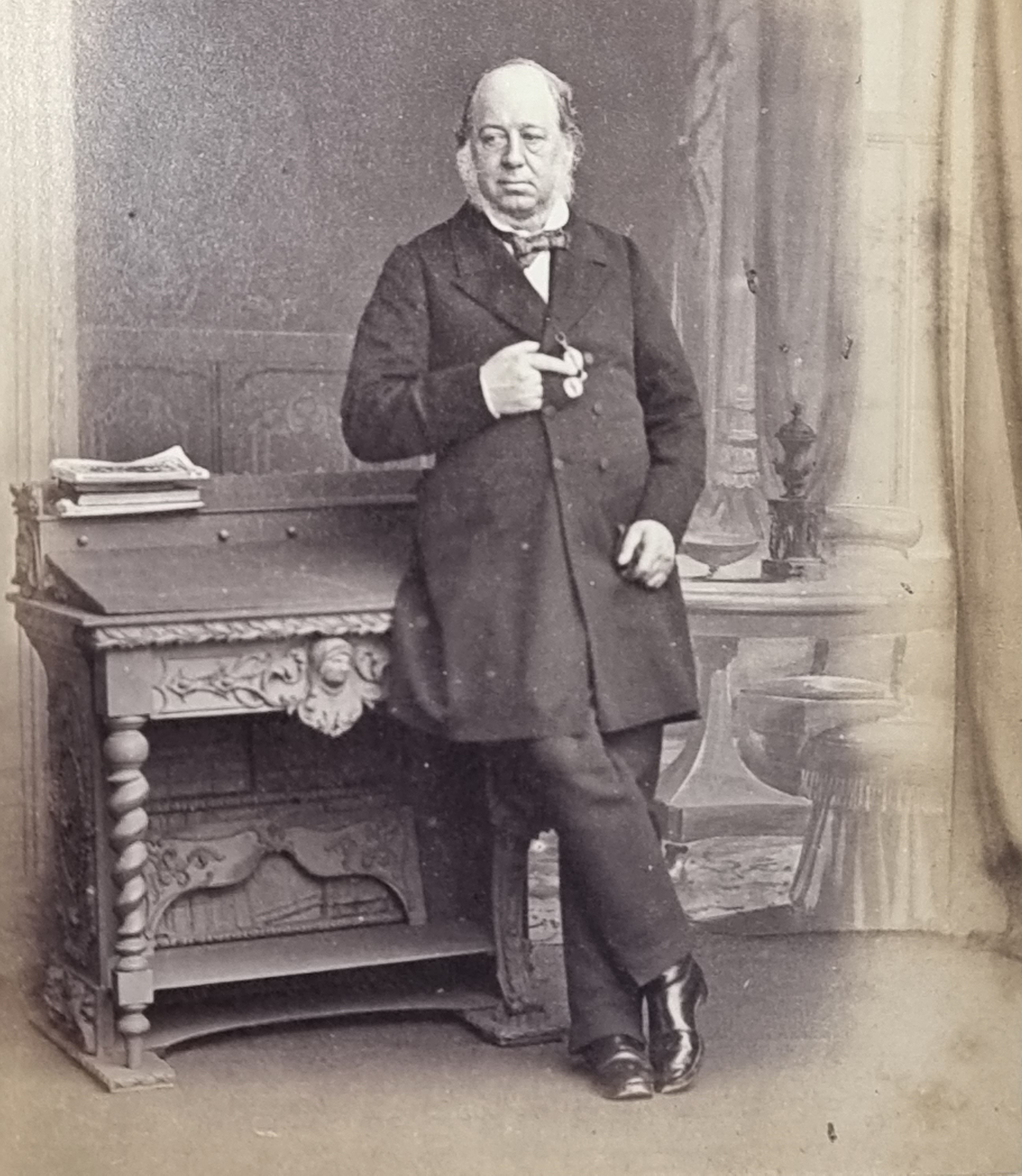
A studio photograph (c. 1860)

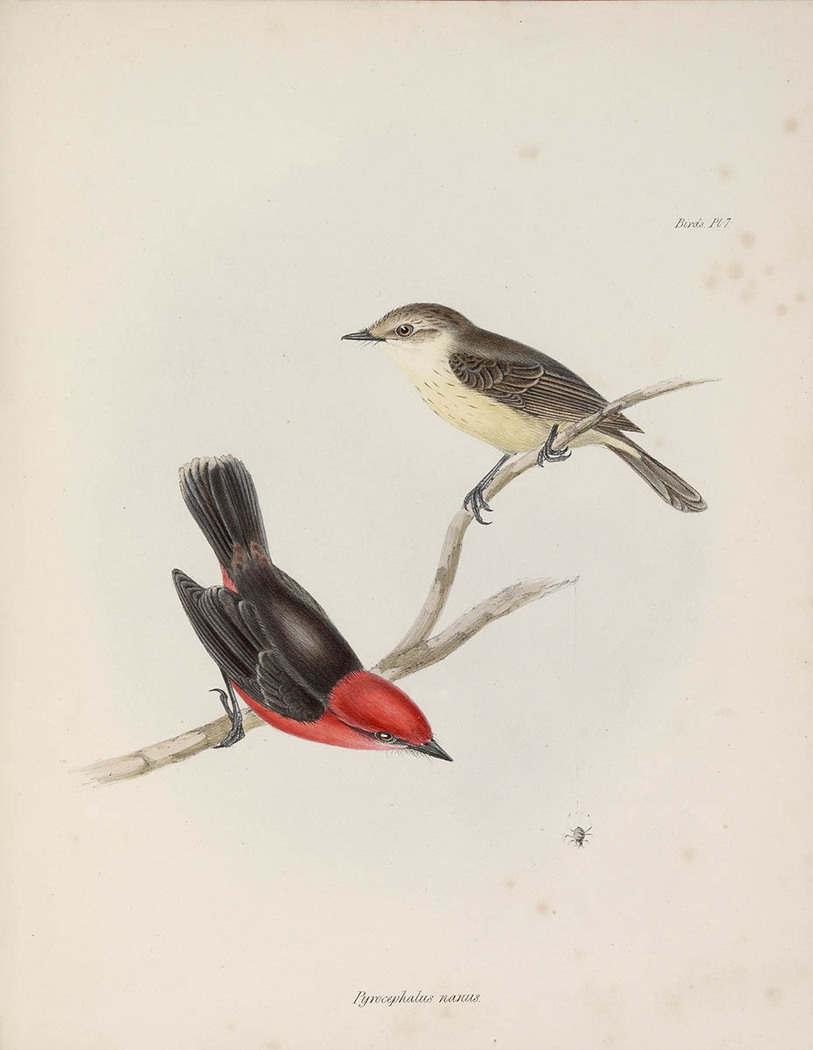
The Zoology of the voyage of H.M.S. Beagle : under the command of Captain Fitzroy, R.N., during the years 1832 to 1836, edited and superintended by Charles Darwin. [Album view] Pl. no. 7, Pyrocephalus nanus held by the State Library of New South Wales digital reference number a1417005h

When Charles Darwin presented his mammal and bird specimens collected during the second voyage of HMS Beagle to the Zoological Society of London on 4 January 1837, the bird specimens were given to Gould for identification. He set aside his paying work and at the next meeting on 10 January reported that birds from the Galápagos Islands which Darwin had thought were blackbirds, "gross-bills" and finches were in fact "a series of ground Finches which are so peculiar" as to form "an entirely new group, containing 12 species." This story made the newspapers. In March, Darwin met Gould again, learning that his Galápagos "wren" was another species of finch and the mockingbirds he had labelled by island were separate species rather than just varieties, with relatives on the South American mainland. Subsequently, Gould advised that the smaller southern Rhea specimen that had been rescued from a Christmas dinner was a separate species which he named Rhea darwinii, whose territory overlapped with the northern rheas. Darwin had not bothered to label his finches by island, but others on the expedition had taken more care. He now sought specimens collected by captain Robert FitzRoy and crewmen. From them he was able to establish that the species were unique to islands, an important step on the inception of his theory of evolution by natural selection. Gould's work on the birds was published between 1838 and 1842 in five numbers as Part 3 of Zoology of the Voyage of H.M.S. Beagle, edited by Charles Darwin. Elizabeth Gould illustrated all the plates for Part 3.

== Research in Australia ==
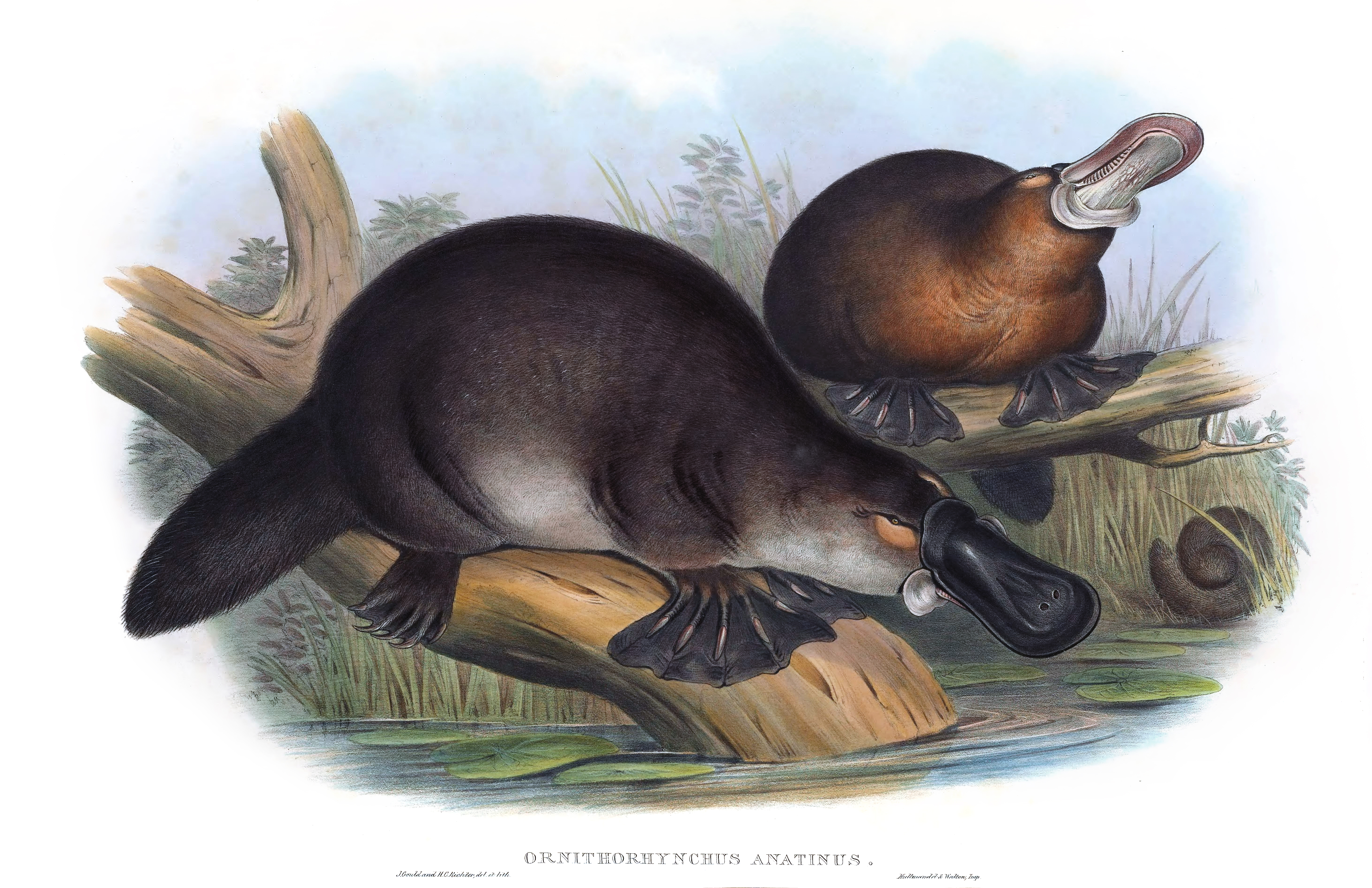
Platypus from The Mammals of Australia (1845–63)

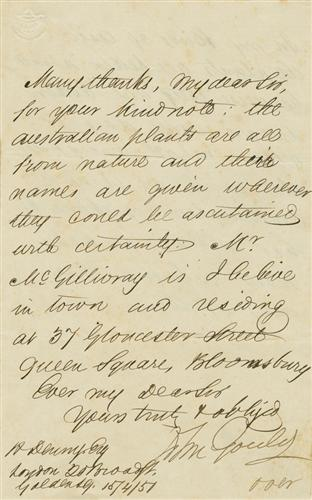
Letter from John Gould to R. Denny regarding Australian plants

In 1838 the Goulds sailed to Australia, intending to study the birds of that country and be the first to produce a major work on the subject. They took with them the collector John Gilbert. They arrived in Tasmania in September, making the acquaintance of the governor Sir John Franklin and his wife. Gould and Gilbert collected on the island. In February 1839 Gould sailed to Sydney, leaving his pregnant wife with the Franklins. He travelled to his brother-in-law's station at Yarrundi, spending his time searching for bowerbirds in the Liverpool Range. In April he returned to Tasmania for the birth of his son. In May he sailed to Adelaide to meet Charles Sturt, who was preparing to lead an expedition to the Murray River. Gould collected in the Mount Lofty range, the Murray Scrubs and Kangaroo Island, returning again to Hobart in July. He then travelled with his wife to Yarrundi. They returned home to England in May 1840.

The result of the trip was The Birds of Australia (1840–48), a seven volume work which is the first comprehensive illustrated account of Australian birds. It included a total of 600 plates in seven volumes; 328 of the species described were new to science and named by Gould. He also published A Monograph of the Macropodidae, or Family of Kangaroos (1841–1842) and the three-volume work The Mammals of Australia (1849–1861).

Elizabeth died in 1841 after the birth of their eighth child, Sarah, and Gould's books subsequently used illustrations by a number of artists, including Henry Constantine Richter, William Matthew Hart and Joseph Wolf.

Even after leaving Australia, John Gould corresponded with many scientists and collectors in the colonies, including Frederick McCoy, who was the director of the National Museum of Victoria from 1857 to 1899. These letters detail the sale of specimens, including mammals, insects, shells, and bird skins for the museum's collections, and copies of Gould's scientific publications for the museum library. Gould insisted that any species of birds that were at that time new to Western science be forwarded to him in London to be described and figured.

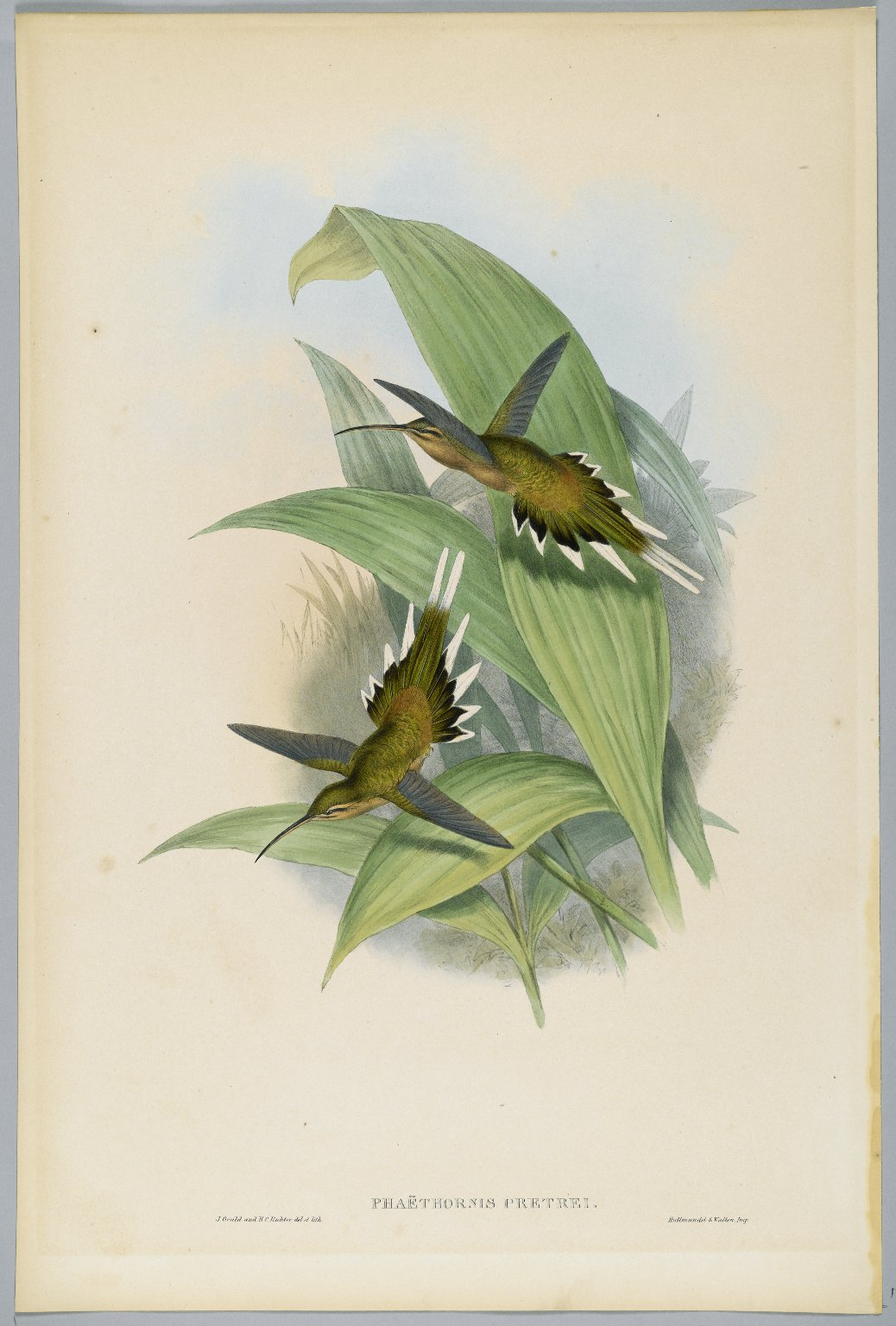
Phaethornis Pretrei, the Planalto Hermit, Brooklyn Museum

== Hummingbirds ==
Throughout his professional life, Gould had a strong interest in hummingbirds. He accumulated a collection of 320 species, which he exhibited at the Great Exhibition of 1851. Despite his interest, Gould had never seen a live hummingbird. In May 1857, he travelled to the United States with his second son, Charles. He arrived in New York too early in the season to see hummingbirds in that city, but on 21 May 1857, in Bartram's Gardens in Philadelphia, he finally saw his first live one, a ruby-throated hummingbird. He then continued to Washington D.C. where he saw large numbers in the gardens of the Capitol. Gould attempted to return to England with live specimens, but, as he was not aware of the conditions necessary to keep them, they only lived for two months at most.

== Birds of Great Britain ==
The University of Glasgow, which owns a copy of Birds of Great Britain, describes John Gould as "the greatest figure in bird illustration after Audubon. Gould was not directly responsible for the illustrations himself, although he supervised their production closely." London booksellers Henry Sotheran Ltd describe the work as "Gould's pride and joy".

Gould had already published some of the illustrations in Birds of Europe, but Birds of Great Britain represents a development of an aesthetic style in which illustrations of nests and young are added on a large scale.

Sotheran's reports that Gould published the book himself, producing 750 copies, which remain sought after both as complete volumes, and as individual plates, currently varying in price from £450 – £850. The University of Glasgow records that the volumes were issued in London in 25 parts, to make the complete set, between 1863 and 1873, and each set contained 367 coloured lithographs.

Gould undertook an ornithological tour of Scandinavia in 1856, in preparation for the work, taking with him the artist Henry Wolf who drew 57 of the plates from Gould's preparatory sketches. According to The University of Glasgow Gould's skill was in rapidly producing rough sketches from nature (a majority of the sketches were drawn from newly killed specimens) capturing the distinctiveness of each species. Gould then oversaw the process whereby his artists worked his sketches up into the finished drawings, which were made into coloured lithographs by engraver William Hart.

There were problems: the stone engraving of the snowy owl in volume I was dropped and broken at an early stage in the printing. Later issues of this plate show evidence of this damage and consequently the early issue – printed before the accident – are considered more desirable.

The lithographs were hand coloured. In the introduction for the work, Gould states "every sky with its varied tints and every feather of each bird were coloured by hand; and when it is considered that nearly two hundred and eighty thousand illustrations in the present work have been so treated, it will most likely cause some astonishment to those who give the subject a thought."

The work has gathered critical acclaim: according to Mullens and Swann, Birds of Great Britain is "the most sumptuous and costly of British bird books", whilst Wood describes it as "a magnificent work". Isabella Tree writes that it "was seen – perhaps partly because its subject was British, as the culmination of [his] ... genius".

== Tributes ==
A number of animals have been named after Gould, including those in English such as the Gould's mouse.

Birds named by or after Gould include:

- Gould's petrel (Pterodroma leucoptera)
- Gould's shortwing (Brachypteryx stellata)
- Gould's frogmouth (Batrachostomus stellatus)
- Gould's jewelfront (Heliodoxa aurescens)
- Gould's inca (Coeligena inca)
- Gould's toucanet (Selenidera gouldii)
- Dot-eared coquette (Lophornis gouldii)
- Olive-backed euphonia (Euphonia gouldi)

Two species of reptiles are named in his honour: Gould's monitor (Varanus gouldii) and Gould's hooded snake (Parasuta gouldii).

The Tasmanian giant freshwater crayfish (Astacopsis gouldi) was named after Gould's son Charles.

Gould's sunbird, or Mrs. Gould's sunbird, (Aethopyga gouldiae) and the Gouldian finch (Erythrura gouldiae) were named after his wife.

A visit to Gould in his old age provided the inspiration for John Everett Millais's painting The Ruling Passion.

The Gould League, founded in Australia in 1909, was named after him. This organisation gave many Australians their first introduction to birds, along with more general environmental and ecological education. One of its major sponsors was the Royal Australasian Ornithologists Union.

In 1976, he was honoured on a postage stamp, bearing his portrait, issued by Australia Post. In 2009, a series of birds from his Birds of Australia, with paintings by H. C. Richter, were featured in another set of stamps.

== Family ==
Gould married the painter Elizabeth Coxen (18 July 1804 – 15 August 1841) on 5 January 1829. They had at least three sons, (John) Henry Gould (1829–1855) and Franklin Gould (1839–1873) dying before him. Their youngest son, Charles Gould, was a geological surveyor. They also had three daughters, Eliza (born c. 1832), Louisa (born 1837) and Sarah "Sai" Gould (born 1841). Elizabeth Gould died from puerperal fever after giving birth to Sarah, her eighth child.

== Bibliography ==
Among the publications of John Gould are:

- Gould, John (1832–1837). The Birds of Europe. London: published by the author; printed by Richard and John E. Taylor. OCLC 858091802 (all editions). 5 vols. Drawn from nature & on stone by J. & E. Gould.
- John Gould; A Monograph of the Ramphastidae, or Family of Toucans; 1833–35. 1 vol. 34 plates; Artists: J. Gould, E. Gould, E. Lear and G. Scharf; Lithographers: E. Gould and E. Lear;
- John Gould; A Synopsis of the Birds of Australia, and the Adjacent Islands; 1837–38 1 vol. 73 plates; Artist and lithographer: E. Gould
- John Gould; The Birds of Australia; 1840–48. 7 vols. 600 plates; Artists: J. Gould and E. Gould; Lithographer: E. Gould
- John Gould; A Monograph of the Odontophorinae, or Partridges of America; 1844–50 1 vol. 32 plates; Artists: J. Gould and H. C. Richter; Lithographer: H. C. Richter
- John Gould; Monograph of the Trochilidae, or Family of Humming-Birds; 1849–61 5 vol. 25 parts, 360 plates; Artists: J. Gould and H. C. Richter; Lithographer: H. C. Richter; title pages for the volumes were issued last and are all dated 1861
- John Gould; The Birds of Asia; 1850–83 7 vols. 530 plates, Artists: J. Gould, H. C. Richter, W. Hart and J. Wolf; Lithographers: H. C. Richter and W. Hart; Parts 33–55 completed after Gould's death by R. Bowdler Sharpe; Vol VI :Artist and lithographer: W. Hart
- John Gould; The Birds of Australia; Supplement 1851–69. 1 vol. 81 plates; Artists: J. Gould and H. C. Richter; Lithographer: H. C. Richter
- John Gould; The Birds of Great Britain; 1873. 5 vols. 367 plates; Artists: J. Gould, J. Wolf, H.C. Richter and W. Hart; Lithographers: H. C. Richter and W. Hart
- John Gould; The Birds of New Guinea and the Adjacent Papuan Islands, including many new species recently discovered in Australia; 1875–88. 5 vols. 300 plates; Parts 13–25 completed after Gould's death by R. Bowdler Sharpe; Artists: J. Gould and W. Hart; Lithographer: W. Hart
- John Gould; A Monograph of the Trochilidae, or Family of Humming-birds Supplement, completed after Gould's death by R. Bowdler Sharpe; 1880–87. 5 parts. 58 plates; Artists: J. Gould and W. Hart; Lithographer: W. Hart

== Note ==
John Gould also happened to live next to the famous Broad Street pump during 1854. The pioneering epidemiologist John Snow mentions Gould and his assistant Prince in his famous publication: On the mode of communication of cholera.

== See also ==
- for species named for Gould
- for species named for Gould

== Sources ==
- Chisholm, A. H. 1938. Out of the past: Gould material discovered. Victoria Naturalist 55:95–102.
- Desmond, Adrian and James Moore. 1991. Charles Darwin (Penguin)
- Lambourne, Maureen. 1987. John Gould. Bird Man. (Osberton)
- Maguire, T. H. 1846–1852. Portraits of the Honorary Members of the Ipswich Museum (George Ransome, Ipswich).
- Sauer, G. C. 1948. Bird art and artists; John Gould. American Antiques Journal 3:6–9.
- Sauer, G. C. 1983. John Gould in America. In Contributions to the History of North American Natural History. London, Society for the Bibliography of Natural History Special Publication No. 2:51–58.
- Sauer, G. C. 1982. John Gould the bird man: a chronology and bibliography. (Melbourne, Landsdowne)
- Sauer, G. C. 1996. John Gould the bird man: bibliography 2. (Martino Publishing)
- Tree, Isabella. 1991. The Ruling Passion of John Gould (Barrie Jenkins)
- Tree, Isabella. 2003. The Bird Man – The Extraordinary Story of John Gould (Ebury Press)
- Gould, John. 1840–1848. The Birds of Australia: in seven volumes.
- Serle, Percival (1949). "Gould, John". Dictionary of Australian Biography. Sydney: Angus & Robertson.
- Stephen, Leslie; Lee, Sidney, eds. (1890). "Gould, John" . Dictionary of National Biography. Vol. 22. London: Smith, Elder & Co. pp. 287–8.
