= Henry Richter =

Henry Richter may refer to:

- Henry Constantine Richter (1821–1902), zoological illustrator
- Henry James Richter (1772–1857), artist and philosopher
- Henry Richter (bishop) (1838–1916), German-born prelate of the Roman Catholic Church
