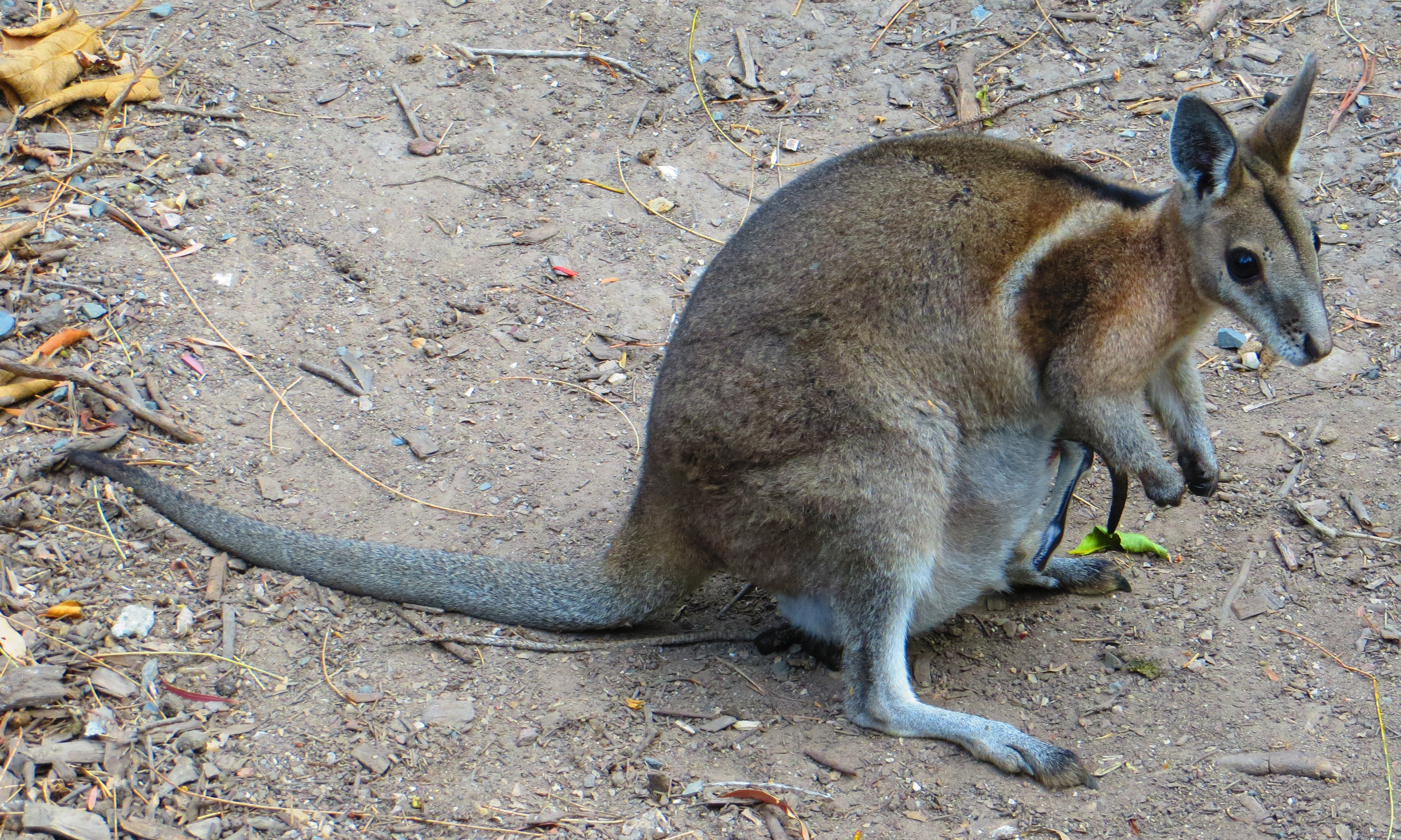
- Female bridled nail-tail wallaby (Onychogalea fraenata) with a joey in its pouch at David Fleay Wildlife Park, Burleigh Heads, Queensland

Conservation status
- Vulnerable (IUCN 3.1)
- CITES Appendix I (CITES)

Scientific classification
- Kingdom: Animalia
- Phylum: Chordata
- Class: Mammalia
- Infraclass: Marsupialia
- Order: Diprotodontia
- Family: Macropodidae
- Genus: Onychogalea
- Species: O. fraenata

Binomial name
- Onychogalea fraenata (Gould, 1841)
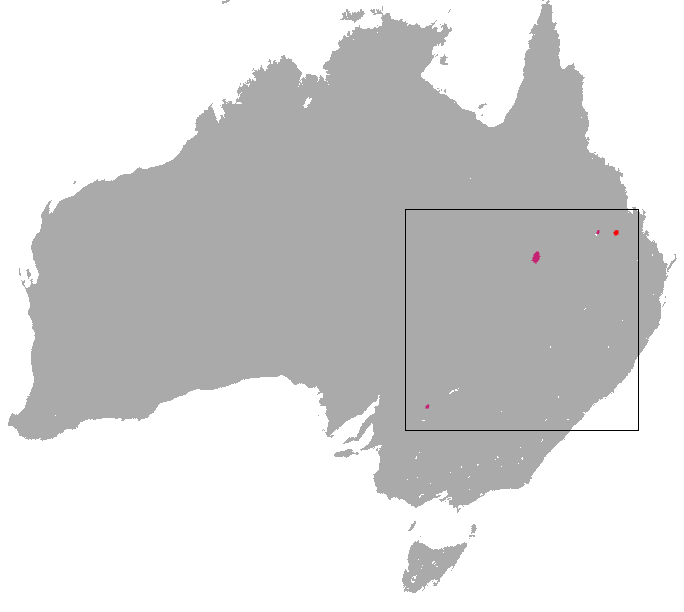

= Bridled nail-tail wallaby =

Species of marsupial

The bridled nail-tail wallaby (Onychogalea fraenata), also known as the bridled nail-tailed wallaby, bridled nailtail wallaby, bridled wallaby, merrin, and flashjack, is a vulnerable species of macropod. It is a small wallaby found in three isolated areas in Queensland, Australia, and whose population is declining. In early 2019 the total population of the species was estimated to be fewer than 500 mature individuals in the wild and 2285 in captivity.

== Taxonomy ==
A specimen was presented to the Linnean Society of London by John Gould in 1840, and published in the society's journal the following year. The date of first publication has been the source of conjecture, and it has been proposed that this was in a 1840 issue of The Athenaeum.

Gould obtained his specimens while in Australia, returning these to England for scientific examination; he gave the animal the common name bridled kangaroo.

== Description ==
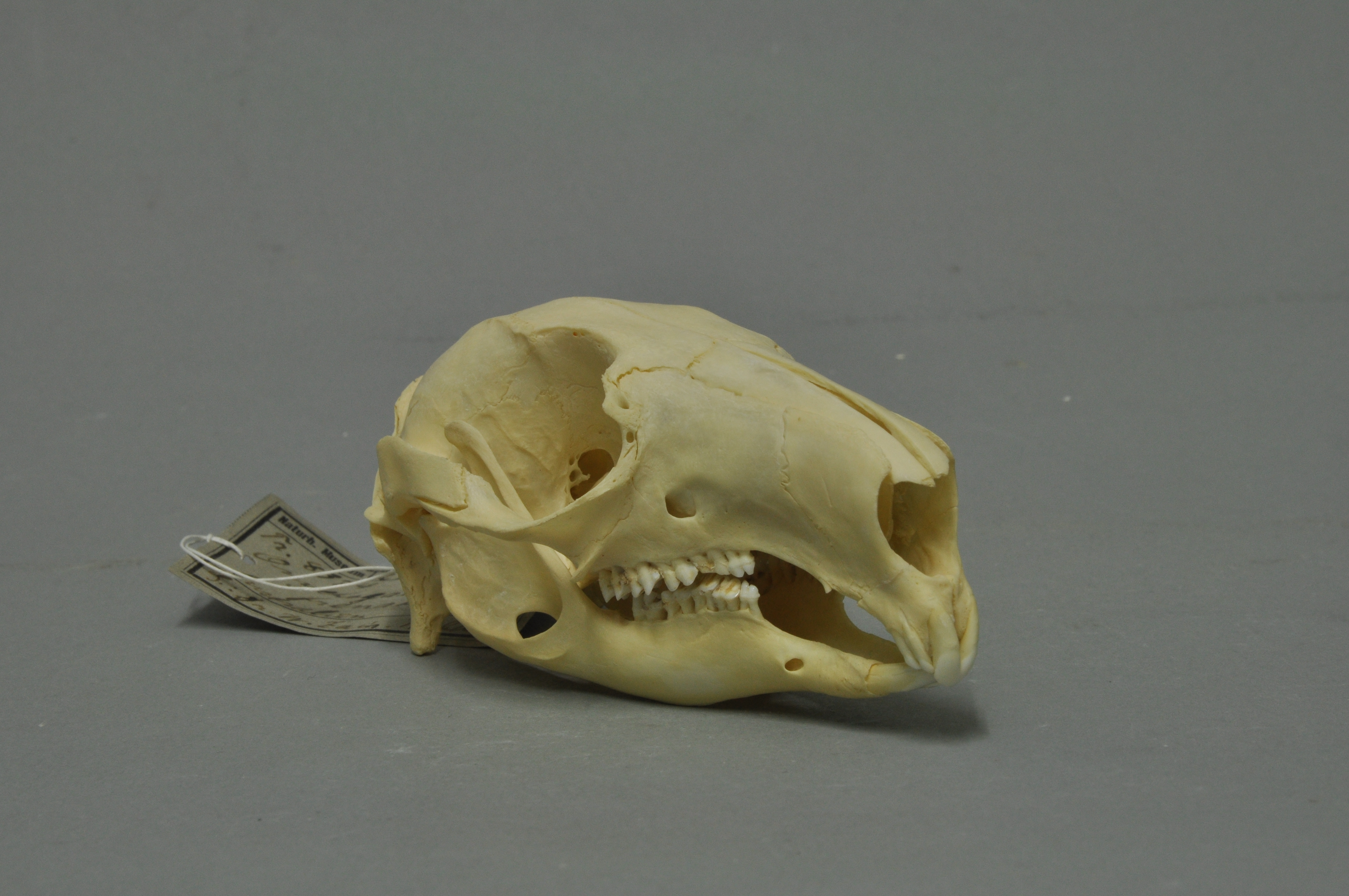
Skull of a bridled nail-tail wallaby

These small wallabies are named for two distinguishing characteristics: a white "bridle" line that runs down from the back of the neck around the shoulders, and a horny spur on the end of the tail. Other key physical features include a black stripe running down the dorsum of the neck between the scapulae, large eyes, and white stripes on the cheeks, which are often seen in other species of wallabies as well.

The bridled nail-tail wallaby can grow to one metre in length, half of which is tail, and weighs 4–8 kg. Females are somewhat smaller than the males. The tail spur can be 3–6 mm long and partly covered in hair. Its purpose is unclear.

The "nail-tail" is a feature common to two other species of wallabies: the northern nail-tail wallaby and the crescent nail-tail wallaby (which was declared to be extinct in 1956).

The taste of the meat of this species was described by Gould as excellent.

== Ecology and behaviour ==
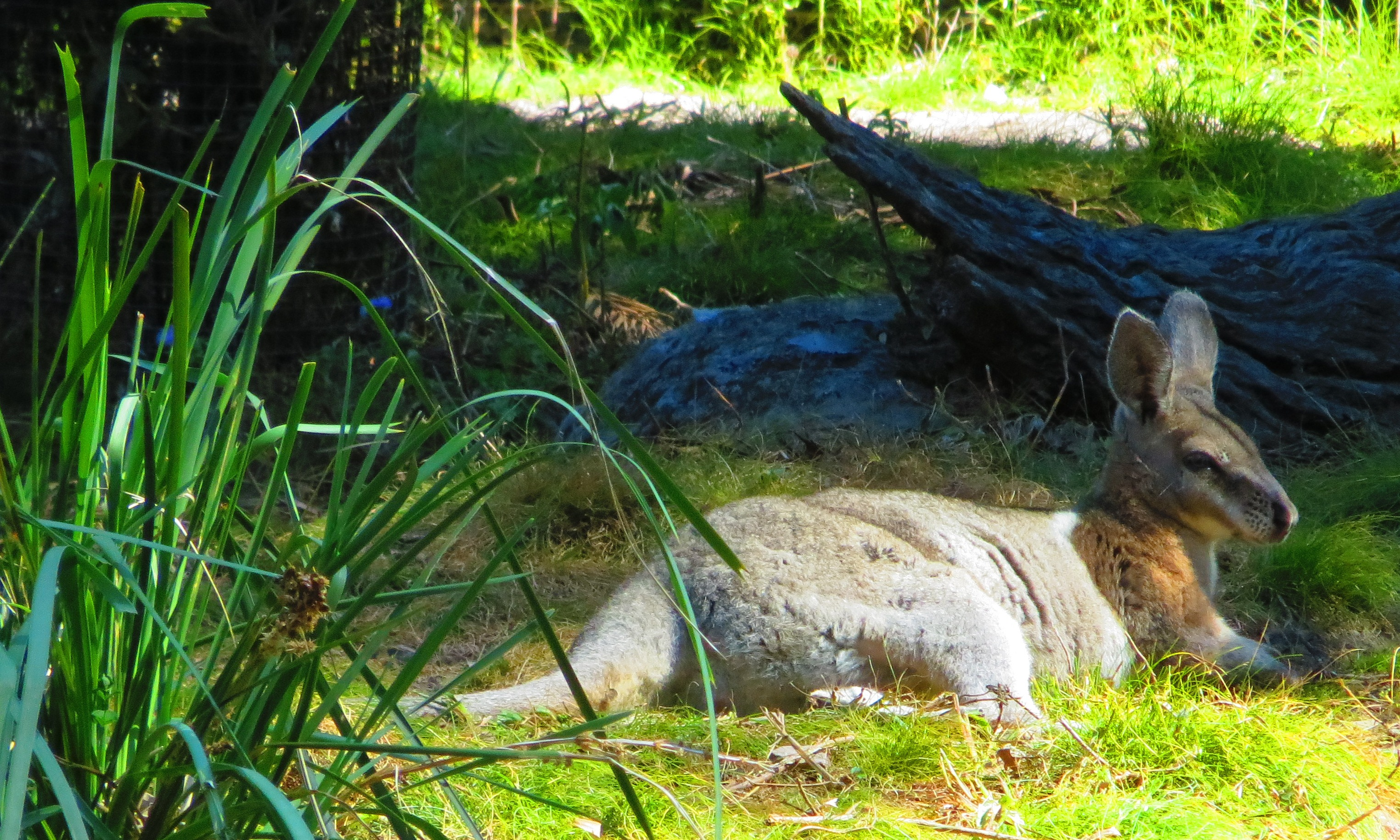
Male bridled nail-tail wallaby at David Fleay Wildlife Park, Burleigh Heads, Queensland

The species are most active during the night-time and dusk periods. Day is usually spent sleeping in hollows near bushes or trees. In modern habitats, nail-tails keep close to the edges of pasture grasses. These wallabies have a reputation as shy and solitary animals. They may occasionally form small groups of up to four to feed together when grazing is in short supply.

Gould was able to view the animal in its native habitat and recorded observations of its behaviour at the area around Brezi and then to observe their capture by the indigenous people at "Gundermein" on around the lower Namoi River. His notes the rapid movement of a live animal when pursued, outpacing the dogs accompanying his party, which ascended up a hollow tree and leapt from the top to enter a hollow log. At a second site Gould witnessed the capture of the species with nets by the local people, fulfilling his request for a series of specimens.

The bridled nail-tail wallaby has a polygynous mating system. After a gestation period of about 23 days, the single joey undergoes further development in the mother's pouch for around four more months.

The bridled nail-tail wallaby's defence behaviour when threatened by native predators is usually to lie flat on the ground and find some cover. However, in 2021 it was observed that in response to introduced predators such as feral cats and foxes, it had altered its behaviour and had learnt to hide in response to smelling the predator.

The bridled nail-tail wallaby is of interest to marsupial researchers because it appears to have a more vigorous immune system than other species of macropods. In the words of marsupial immunologist Dr Lauren Young, "These wallabies appear to be able to survive parasite infections, viruses and various diseases more readily than other marsupials".

== Distribution and habitat ==
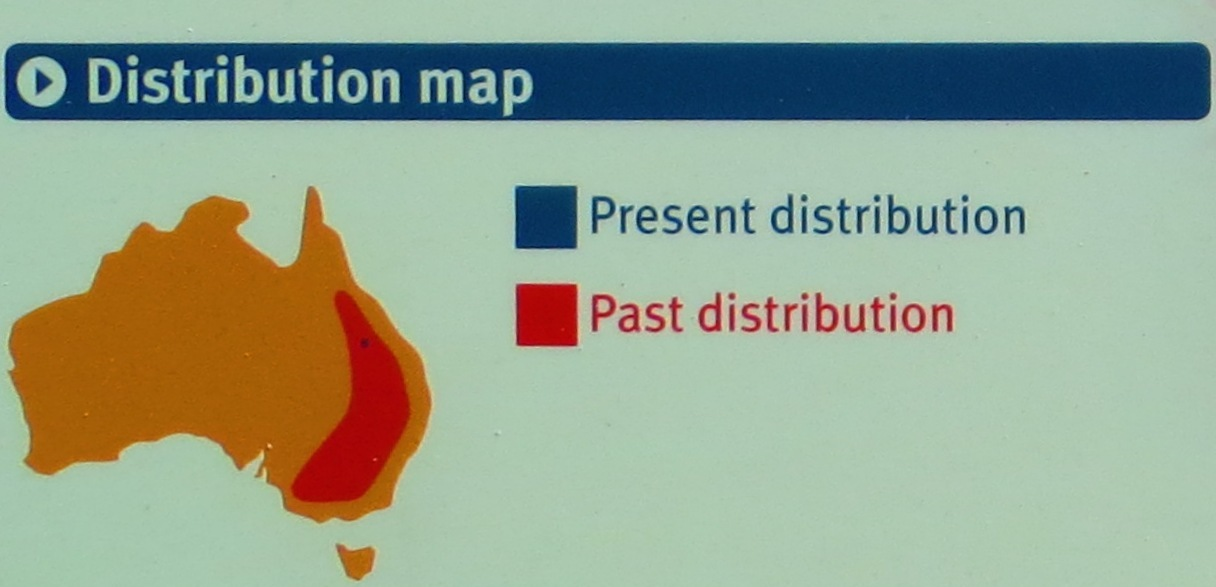
Map showing past and present distribution of the bridled nailtail wallaby

At the time of European settlement of Australia, bridled nail-tail wallabies were common all along the East Australian coastline region to the west of the Great Dividing Range. Naturalists in the 19th century reported that the species ranged from the Murray River region of Victoria through central New South Wales to Charters Towers in Queensland.

The species declined in the late 19th and early 20th centuries with no confirmed sightings between 1937 and 1973, by which time it was believed to be extinct. After reading an article in a magazine about Australia's extinct species, a fencing contractor reported that there was an extant population on a property near Dingo, Queensland. This sighting was subsequently confirmed by researchers from the Queensland Parks and Wildlife Service, and the property became Taunton National Park in 1973, a scientific nature reserve for the purpose of ensuring the ongoing survival and protection of this endangered species.

As of 2001, the range of this wallaby was estimated at less than 5% of its original range. The extant population was estimated to be fewer than 500 mature individuals in the wild in 2019.

== Conservation ==
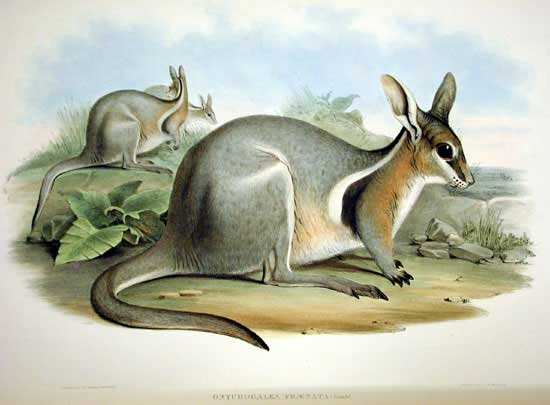
Lithograph of Onychogalea fraenata from second volume of The Mammals of Australia by John Gould, 1863

In the early 1900s this species suffered dramatically from shooting, for its fur and because it was considered a pest. Current threats to the species include predation by introduced species such as feral cats, red foxes, and dingoes. Other threats include wildfires, prolonged drought, habitat destruction by the pastoral industry and competition for food from grazers, such as rabbits and domestic sheep.

Since its rediscovery, the bridled nail-tail wallaby has been the target of private conservation efforts to re-establish viable populations. Captive breeding programs established three populations in Queensland: two in State reserves located at Idalia and Taunton National Parks, and another on a private reserve, Project Kial, located near Marlborough in Central Queensland.

After the last captive-breeding facility in Queensland failed, the remaining animals were transferred to Avocet Nature Refuge (south of Emerald), with the total population there and at Taunton estimated at around 600. As of 2019, the species was confined to three populations: Taunton and Avocet in Queensland, and Australian Wildlife Conservancy's Scotia Sanctuary in New South Wales, where there were more than 1,000 wallabies in 2018.

In August 2019, 41 Bridled Nailtail Wallabies were scouted from Taunton and Scotia for reintroduction to a feral predator-free breeding area within the Pilliga State Conservation Area in northwestern NSW. The translocation was conducted by Australian Wildlife Conservancy in partnership with NSW National Parks and Services, as part of the NSW Government's Saving our Species program.

A new strategy known as head-starting has been trialled at Avocet, with a successful outcome reported in May 2021: the population had grown by more than 100% over three years. A 10-hectare (25-acre) area had been fenced off three years earlier, with the youngest wallabies placed in it and allowed to grow in an area safe from feral cats, after studies had shown that it was overwhelmingly this group that was most vulnerable to predation. Although this method had been tested on reptiles and birds before, this was its first trial with land-based mammals.

At Taunton Conservation Park, a total of 65 of the wallabies were recorded in 2008, but by early 2021, the population had risen to an estimated 1,300.
