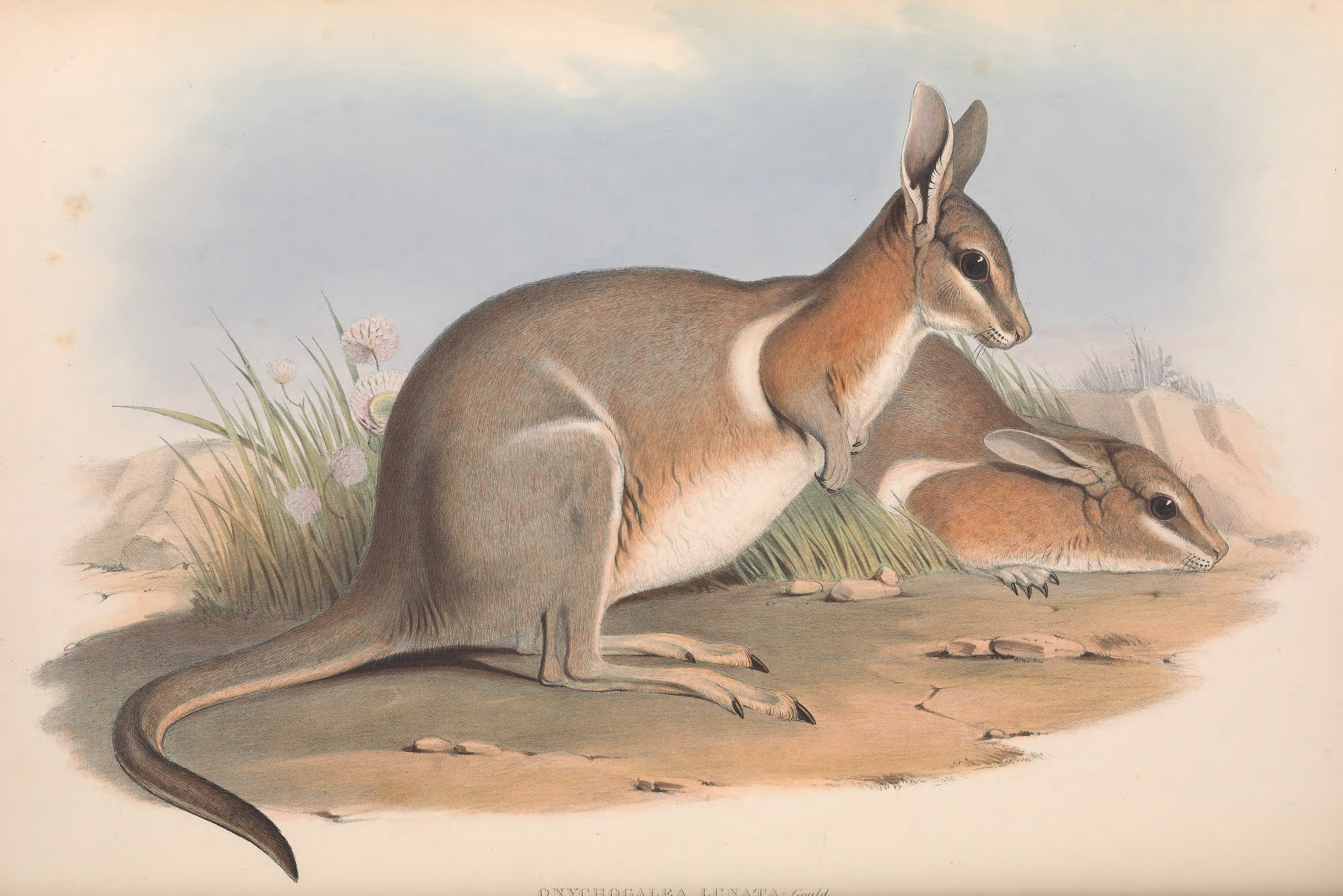
- Illustration of male with female in background (Gould; Richter, 1863)

Conservation status
- Extinct (1956) (IUCN 3.1)

Scientific classification
- Kingdom: Animalia
- Phylum: Chordata
- Class: Mammalia
- Infraclass: Marsupialia
- Order: Diprotodontia
- Family: Macropodidae
- Genus: Onychogalea
- Species: †O. lunata

Binomial name
- †Onychogalea lunata (Gould, 1841)

= Crescent nail-tail wallaby =

Extinct species of marsupial

The crescent nail-tail wallaby, also known as the worong (Onychogalea lunata), is a small extinct species of marsupial that grazed on grasses in the scrub and woodlands of southwestern and central Australia. They were common in Western Australia before they disappeared in the early 20th century and persisted in the central deserts until at least the 1950s. The pelage was soft and silky and an ashen grey colouring overall, highlighted in part with rufous tones. There were light and dark patches of fur across the body, the moon-like crescents inspiring their names, and had attractive stripes on the face. Like the two remaining species of the genus, the northern Onychogalea unguifera and rare O. fraenata (bridled nailtail), it had a horny spur at the tip of its tail. The species was compared to a hare or rabbit, in its habits, appearance and taste, and weighed around 3.5 kilograms.

The species was extremely timid and would flee to a hollow log if disturbed at their daytime resting places, a small patch of sand cleared near a large shrub or tree. They ran with their short forelimbs awkwardly held toward the chest.

== Taxonomy ==
The first description and specimens of the animal were presented by John Gould to the Linnean Society of London in 1840 and published in its Proceedings in 1841, assigning the new species to the genus Macropus and the epithet derived from the Latin lunatus, meaning "of the moon", for its crescent-shaped marks. When Gould completed his second volume of Mammals of Australia (1849) he provided a lithograph depicting a male and female by Henry C. Richter and named the species as Onychogalea lunata, allying it to a genus established by George Waterhouse. The systematic revision of Australian mammals by Oldfield Thomas in 1888 recognised Gould's description as one of three species of the genus, and re-examined specimens from western and southern Australia that were held at the British Museum. Thomas noted the type specimen as one of the three collected by John Gilbert at the Swan River colony, the skin and skull of an immature male.

Gould provided a common name for the species, lunated nail-tailed kangaroo, and cites John Gilbert's report for a name from the Nyungar language as "the Waurong". The term crescent wallaby was noted by Thomas for the species, and it came to be distinguished as the crescent nail-tailed wallaby. A local term by settlers, kangaroo rabbit, was recorded by Gilbert, explained as the resemblance of the animal's soft fur and long ears to the exotic species. The names referring to the species include "tjawalpa" and "warlpartu", reported by Aboriginal peoples of the central deserts. Names recorded for other regions include yiwutta in the Arunta language and the Pitjanjarra (Anangu people) names are "unkalda" and "towala" ("towalpo"). Variants on the name throughout the southwest of Australia, recorded by Gilbert and most subsequent historical sources from Nyungar informants, was regularised for common usage with the spelling "worong" or "wurrung" and syllabic pronunciation "wo'rong".

== Description ==
A species of Onychogalea, presumed to be extinct. They were one of the three known species of the genus, named for their distinctive tails that possessed a nail or claw-like tip. The animal was distinguished by a whitish crescent shaped mark that extends from the shoulder behind the arm, through the flank, and terminated in a point above the leg. A distinctly contrasting striping extends along the length of the hind limb, from the thigh to the hip and in a line to the knee. The weight of the species was around 3.5 kilograms, smaller than others of the genus. The head and body length combined was from 370 to 510 millimetres, greater than the tail length of 150 to 330 mm. The upper-parts of the pelage were an ash-grey colour, broken by the light crescent markings and a short blackish crest of hair along the top of tail. A less distinct blackish mark at either side of the muzzle reached from the nose to the eye.

Oldfield Thomas gave a diagnosis of the three species, distinguishing their superficial characters and tabulating a close comparison of their cranial measurements. This species was regarded by Thomas as more closely allied to Onychogalea fraenata, both in size and skull morphology. The undercoat of the fur was relatively long, with hair that was slate-grey at the base and paler towards its tips; the texture of the pelage was woolly and soft. The relatively light skull was flattened at the forehead, dentition was also small and light; teeth such as the canines were tiny and probably purposeless. Their muzzle narrowed to a pointed shape, accentuated by the appealing light and dark markings of the face.

The species was hunted for food by the English settlers of southwest Australia, who described the flesh as white, resembling chicken and having a flavour similar to rabbit.

== Behaviour ==
The habits of O. lunata are poorly known, with information being restricted in the few reported observations and records of Aboriginal informants from the central desert regions. Observers often reported that the species was exceptionally timid and would seek refuge at the slightest indication of a human presence. John Gilbert's report to Gould in the early 1840s was quoted in his Mammals of Australia,

"[t]he Waurong is found in the gum forests [eucalypt woodlands] of the interior of Western Australia, where there are patches of thick scrub and dense thickets, in the open glades intervening between which it is occasionally seen sunning itself, but at the slightest alarm immediately betakes itself to the shelter of the thick scrub; the dogs sometimes succeed in driving it out to the open spots, when, like the Kangaroo rats, it runs to the nearest hollow log, and is then easily captured. I remarked, that when sitting quietly cleaning itself, there was a constant twitching of the tail in an upward direction; an action which I have never seen performed by any other Kangaroo. I was not sufficiently near to ascertain whether this motion of the tail had any connection with the claw or nail at its extremity, but I think it not improbable. The Waurong makes no nest, but forms a hollow in the soft ground beneath a thick brush in which it lies during the heat of the day."

Further observations of the animal were provided by Bruce Leake, a settler at Kellerberrin, who describes the fleeing animal as seeking refuge in a hollow tree and climbing far up to its interior to escape a pursuer. (Note: Leake, B. 1962. Eastern wheatbelt wildlife. Leake, B., Perth. in Burbidge, Red List (2008, op. cit.).) When pursued by Noongar hunters, they would light a fire at the base of the tree and use smoke to drive the animal out. A recollection by an informant, printed by The West Australian in 1925, stated they held one of the forelimbs as if carrying something and always seemed to be moving with an urgent manner. The behaviour was well known to the Aboriginal peoples of the central deserts, where the species persisted after their disappearance from the semi-arid regions, and were able to provide information some forty years since their last sighting in the mid twentieth century. The track of O. lunatus was distinguishable from the northern nailtail O. unguifera, which had a peculiar gait, and they could be captured by corralling them with brush fences and clubbed as they sought the exit. The habit of resting on their side in the open, noted by Gilbert at near the west coast, is also reported in its arid habitat as resting beneath the shade of a tree or shrub. Their choice of refuge from predators, a thicket or hollow log, varied between the people providing the information.

== Distribution and habitat ==
A species with a wide distribution at the time of colonisation, it then contracted from the coast and is now presumably extinct. The distribution range covered a large area of the continent, from the northwestern coast through the central and southerly regions that extended toward New South Wales. They occupied a wide range of habitat in arid and semi-arid environments dominated by a variety of shrublands and woodlands.

The habitat of the species was in a variety of vegetation types, although commonly associated with low scrub or thickets that were very dense. A common tree of the local environment was sheoak, Allocasuarina species, or the stinkwood Jacksonia furcellata. Their abode is comparable to a European hare, a simple clearing or "squat", and they resided in areas so densely vegetated that they were often unnoticed and unobtainable by hunters. While the species was found in denser habitat than the tammar Macropus eugenii, a similar macropod, they were often found in the same locations.

The species was regarded as common, if not abundant, until its rapid decline. At the beginning of the 20th century Guy Shortridge was able to assemble a series of 23 specimens collected in the Wheatbelt region of Western Australia. A South African curator and collector employed by the British Museum, Shortridge conducted what was the only major field survey of mammalian fauna in that period, and noted the absence of previously reported mammal species from the southern and western coastal regions. He was able to make collections inland from King George Sound, several specimens captured on the Arthur River near Wagin, and a larger collection made near Pingelly.

Shortridge's second field report on 18 specimens from "Woyaline, east of Pinjelly", published by Oldfield Thomas in 1907, was to be amongst the last descriptions of the declining population:

"More local than Macropus eugenei and seeming to prefer lower and more scrubby thickets than that animal. Very numerous in some localities; it rather resembles the Kangaroo-Rats (Bettongia penicillata) in some of its habits, often running into hollow logs when disturbed. "Native name, 'Wurrine' or 'Wurrung.'" – Shortridge, G. C. in Thomas, O. (1907).

A collection made at Alice Springs on the Horn expedition (1894) extended the known range of the species. H. H. Finlayson reported in 1961 that he believed the species to be rare but still be extant, and gave the last record as one killed in 1956 between the Jervois and Tarlton Ranges of the Northern Territory. A field worker in Central Australian region, Finlayson extensively used interviews with the Aboriginal peoples still hunting in the region, and noted that it was disappearing from the area around the Musgrave, Everard Ranges in South Australia and the Cavenagh Range in Western Australia. Informants from the central deserts reported that it occupied all types of habitat, including stony hills and especially associated with mulga scrubland. References to the animal's distribution throughout the Flinders Ranges was reported by the Adnyamathanha people of the region. Displacement within a local ecology by the European rabbit may have amongst the factors responsible for their extirpation. Loss of habitat by clearing and degradation through the actions of altered land management practices, pastoralism, sheep and wheat farming, and degradation by extensive use of fire are assumed to be most significant factors in their extinction. However, the species is known to have persisted in areas of central desert that were invaded by the rabbit. The local disappearance of O. lunatus, along with all other small mammal species at Kellerberrin, was reported to Alexander Milligan by B. W, Leake as occurring during the 1890s. A specimen was collected at the Everard Ranges by Richard Helms, one of the few mammals returned by an expedition passing through central regions of Australia at a similar time to Leake's report.

Localised extinctions appear to have preceded the arrival of cats and foxes to some regions, often regarded as major threatening factors in the collapse of mammalian fauna in Australia. When this catastrophic decline of small to medium-sized mammals, termed as those in the "critical weight range", is modeled as a hypothesised epizootic event, they are one of a group of species estimated to have weak immunity to the disease and succumbed to it either directly or by increased vulnerability to predators, however, they are not a species mentioned as directly affected in the anecdotal reports of a fatal disease. A news report of this and other small mammal species sudden disappearance at a road connecting Esperance and the Fraser Range, constructed in 1875, is consistent with modeling of the primary factor in the populations demise as disease. The epizootic theory includes secondary and tertiary causes for the extinction of the worong, the clearing for pastoralism that has also been proposed as the primary factor, and the remnants of the population being finally extirpated by hunting.

Unrecorded since the last reliable sighting during the 1940s, the species is listed by the IUCN as presumed extinct. The conservation status was first assessed in 1965 as unknown, and in subsequent editions of the IUCN Red List as extinct. The species appears in palaeontological records dated to the Pleistocene and Holocene, found in local fauna of fossil sites from New South Wales to Western Australia.

This wallaby remained common, even in agricultural districts in the southwest of Western Australia, until about 1900. It had begun a steep decline by 1908, when the last wallaby was caught in the area. The last specimen of this wallaby to be collected alive was caught in a dingo trap on the Nullarbor Plain in 1927 or 1928. W.A. Mills sent it to Taronga Zoo in Sydney and the animal ended up in the Australian Museum. The species survived in the more arid parts of its distribution until the 1950s, and it is thought that it became extinct at about 1956, probably because of the spread of the red fox.
