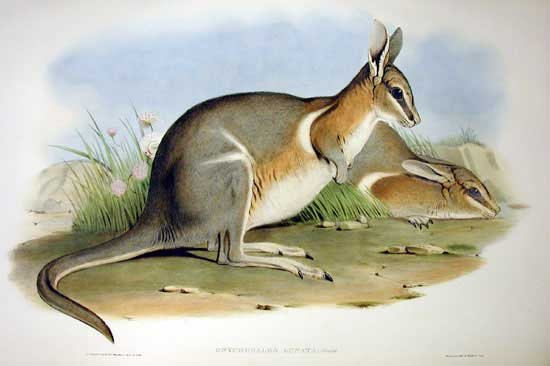
- Crescent nail-tail wallaby

Scientific classification
- Kingdom: Animalia
- Phylum: Chordata
- Class: Mammalia
- Infraclass: Marsupialia
- Order: Diprotodontia
- Family: Macropodidae
- Subfamily: Macropodinae
- Genus: Onychogalea; J. E. Gray, 1841

Type species
- Macropus unguifer Gould, 1841

Species
- Onychogalea fraenata; †Onychogalea lunata; Onychogalea unguifera

= Nail-tail wallaby =

Nail-tail wallabies

Genus of marsupials

The nail-tail wallabies, of genus Onychogalea, are three species of macropods, all found in Australia. Related to kangaroos and wallabies, they are smaller species distinguished by a horny spur at the end of their tail. The northern nail-tail wallaby is still common in the northern part of Australia, the crescent nail-tail is now extinct, and the bridled nail-tail is considered rare and endangered, with probably fewer than 500 mature individuals in the wild. Nail-tail wallabies are smaller than many other wallabies.

== Taxonomy ==
There are three recognised species of the genus Onychogalea, the nail-tailed wallabies, they are:

- Onychogalea fraenata, the bridled nailtail, whose range and population has greatly declined since colonisation;
- †Onychogalea lunata, the crescent nailtail, warong, once abundant and widespread across the southwest and centre, the smallest species entered a rapid decline and became extinct;
- Onychogalea unguifera the northern species, still extant in the Kimberley and Top End regions.

== Description ==
A genus of Macropodidae, small and herbivorous species with a shy disposition. The earliest descriptions noted their elegant shape, graceful movements and beautiful markings. Named for one of their general characteristics, the nail-tailed wallaby has a horny point two or three millimetres wide at the tip of the tail, an almost unknown characteristic for a mammal that has been compared to the bony spur of a lion's tail.
