= Henry James Richter =

English artist and philosopher (1772–1857)

Henry James Richter RA
- Born: 8 March 1772; Soho, London
- Died: 8 April 1857 (aged 85); Lisson Grove, London
- Education: St. Martins Library School London, Royal Academy of Art
- Notable work: The Tight Shoe, Brute of a Husband, Christ Giving Sight to the Blind, The Love Letter, Casting Off the Widow's Weeds
- Patrons: William Chamberlayne (MP)

Henry James Richter RA (1772–1857), artist and philosopher, was born in Middlesex, possibly at 40 Great Newport Street, Soho, on 8 March 1772 and baptised at St Anne's Church, Soho, on 5 April at that same year.

== Family ==
Henry James was the second son (of five children) of John Augustus Richter and Mary Haig. John was originally from Dresden, Germany and was an artist, engraver, and scagliolist, well known for his works in imitation of marble. John Augustus Richter was a partner with Domenico Bartoli another scagliolist in London beginning in 1767 and continuing through the 1777 or 1778. Bartoli emigrated from the port city of Livorn, Italy (often referred to in English as Leghorn) and, after working for almost 10 years with Richter, moved on to Ireland. Henry's older brother, John Richter (1769?–1830), was a prominent radical politician, and member of the London Corresponding Society. He was later arrested for high treason and incarcerated briefly in the Tower of London. In 1794, the Richter brothers compiled and printed John Milton's book of poems called Paradise Lost which included 13 illustrations done by Henry James. The book was dedicated and presented to His Royal Highness George, Prince of Wales while John Richter was on trial for treason. Another brother, Thomas Richter, was a director of the Phoenix Life Insurance Company and remained with them until nearly the mid century. He had a sister, Elizabeth Richter, who married Rev. James Stuart Freeman around July 1808. Richter was educated at Dr Barrow's school (Academy in Soho Square) and St Martin's Library School, London.

Richter got his early education at the Academy in Soho Square. Initially the school was located at 1 Soho Square then around 1726, schoolmaster M. Clare moved it to number 8 where it became known as the Soho Academy. After Claire's death in 1751, his partner, Rev. Cuthbert Barwis took over for a period of time; succeeded upon his death by his nephew John. By the time Richter had entered the school, Reverend Dr. William Barrow had already become schoolmaster and ran the school from 1785 through 1799. During that time it was called occasionally referred to as Dr. Barrows school. Reportedly the school taught mathematics, geography, French, drawing, dancing and fencing. It is believed that Richter attended there between the age of 13 and 18.

In about 1787, he began instruction under the artist Thomas Stothard, with whom he remained a close friend. He also began an association with William Blake. In 1788 he produced his first illustrations (to Shakespeare's plays), and first exhibited paintings, showing two landscapes at the Royal Academy, where he exhibited for many years. He became a student of the Royal Academy Schools in 1790, and reportedly studied anatomy.

== Career ==
Throughout the 1790s Richter worked mainly as an illustrator, demonstrating skills as both draftsman and engraver; projects included editions of Samuel Richardson's Sir Charles Grandison and Clarissa Harlowe (with others, both 1793), Samuel Johnson's Lives of the English Poets (with others, 1797), and J.-H. Bernardin de Saint-Pierre's Paul and Virginia (1799). For a period of time, Richter lived at #26 Newman St. in London. This Street was also known as "Artists Street" because in the two block section were approximately 40 painters, sculptors, engravers and other in the arts including such notable individuals as Robert Cromek at #64, Benjamin West at #14, Thomas Stothard at #28, James Ward at #6, Henry Thomson at #15, Ozias Humphry at #25, George Arnald at #36, James Heath at #42, Thomas Cheesman at #71 and John Phillip "Pope" Davis at #76.

In 1809 Richter began to exhibit at the Associated Artists in Water Colours, Bond Street, becoming a member in 1810, and president in 1811–12. His most popular work at this stage was the genre subject A Brute of a Husband, though he also established himself as a literary painter, with depictions of such characters as Don Quixote and Falstaff, and became one of the few notable artists to paint historical subjects in watercolour. With the dissolution of the Associated Artists in Water Colours in 1812 he was elected a member of the Society of Painters in Oil and Water Colours, though he resigned his membership in December of the same year, and until 1820 was represented on its walls only as an exhibitor. (In that year the society returned to its original form as the Society of Painters in Water Colours.)

Richter was a pioneer in painting from nature, in both practice and theory. In 1812 he painted the oil Christ Giving Sight to the Blind, in bright sunlight on the roof of his house in Newman Street.

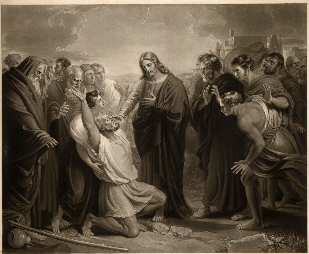
Christ Giving Sight to the Blind - Henry James Richter 1816

The work was purchased by the trustees of the British Institution for 500 guineas and later presented to the New Church, Greenwich, completed in 1825, where it was installed as an altarpiece. A second version, attempting to improve on its truth to nature, was exhibited four years later. An engraving of this was done in 1816 by John Young. Then, in 1817, he published the pamphlet Daylight: a recent discovery in the art of painting, with hints on the philosophy of the fine arts, and on that of the human mind, as first dissected by Immanuel Kant. His more general ideas, including his approach to colour and use of models of his compositions in clay or wax, influenced other painters, notably the miniature painter James Holmes. Daylight combined his artistic interests with his study of metaphysical philosophy. Richter also wrote the article Metaphysics in the Encyclopaedia Londonensis and a paper, German Transcendentalism (1855).

In 1821 Richter was again elected to the Society of Painters in Water Colours, though his membership and the frequency of his exhibits varied through the decade. Between 1827 and 1828, John Sartain apprenticed under Richter. In 1823, the 14-year-old Sartain had sought become an experienced engraver under the indenture of John Swaine of the Merchant and Tailors Company. in 1828, Sartain continued his apprenticeship under Richter. By now he was an experienced engraver and Richter gave him his first attempt at "stipple on steel" or Mezzotint that was titled "Omphale". Around that time, Richter had painted The Tight Shoe and had requested that Sartain do the engraving. Sartain did so, then later did additional engravings after he went to the US. Richter had hoped that Sartain would also do the engraving for his painting, The Brute of a Husband, but their relationship had soured and Sartain left Richter's employ to go out on his own. Between 1829 and 1830, Sartain was self-employed in London before leaving for Philadelphia and becoming very well known and respected in the US. From 1829 until his death, Richter he was both a member and a frequent exhibitor of the Society of Painters in Water Colours. The subject's of his most ambitious paintings of this later phase were taken from Shakespeare. He was also known for drawings and engravings of characters of Sir Walter Scott.

Controversial Work In 1829, Parliament passed the Roman Catholic Relief Act 1829 which allowed members of the Catholic Church to sit in the parliament. Just two months before, Sartain engraved Richter's anti-catholic print, The Tempest, involving characters from William Shakespeare's play. This satirical work reflects the Miranda and Caliban respectively representing “the Church and the Devil” and was hung briefly in the window of a printshop before angry passersby caused it to be removed for fear of trouble.

His work became highly popular through reproductive engravings and, from 1828, through the illustrations he produced for annuals such as the Forget-me-Not and Fisher's Drawing Room Scrapbook for 1833; the painting, The School in an Uproar, was reproduced in several variations and even printed on pocket handkerchiefs. He reportedly produced as many as 150 works in the form of drawings, engravings and paintings. Some examples of his work are in the British Museum and in private collections.

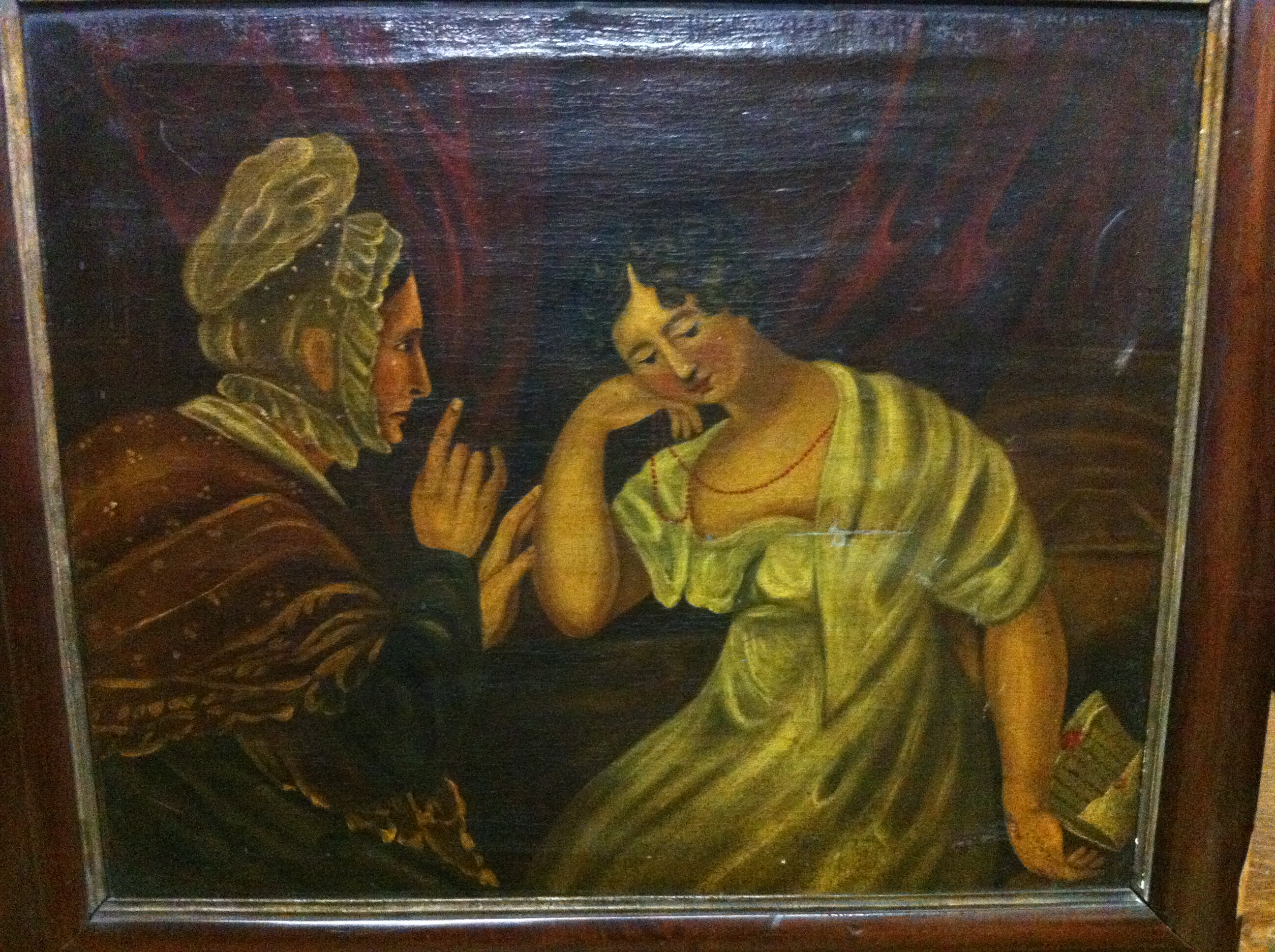
The painting The Love Letter, currently in a private collection.

The painting The Love Letter shows two characters taken from Sir Walter Scott's The Antiquary and was likely painted after 1828. A poem of the same name was written by Letitia Elizabeth Landon, who was noted for creating literary pieces based on drawings and paintings and well known in the UK during that period. The painting depicts Mrs Mailsetter in an admonishing pose and Jenny Caxon, the recipient of a love letter from her older beau, Lieutenant Richard Taffril, who was away at sea. An engraving by Charles Rolls of the painting and the poem were published side by side in Fisher's Drawing Room Scrapbook for 1833 (London, UK Fisher Jackson). An engraving made of this painting also references the title as being "Maternal Solicitude" and an earlier reference in the Literary Souvenir for 1828 gives descriptions of the collection of Alaric Alexander Watts with an alternative title of "Maternal Advice".

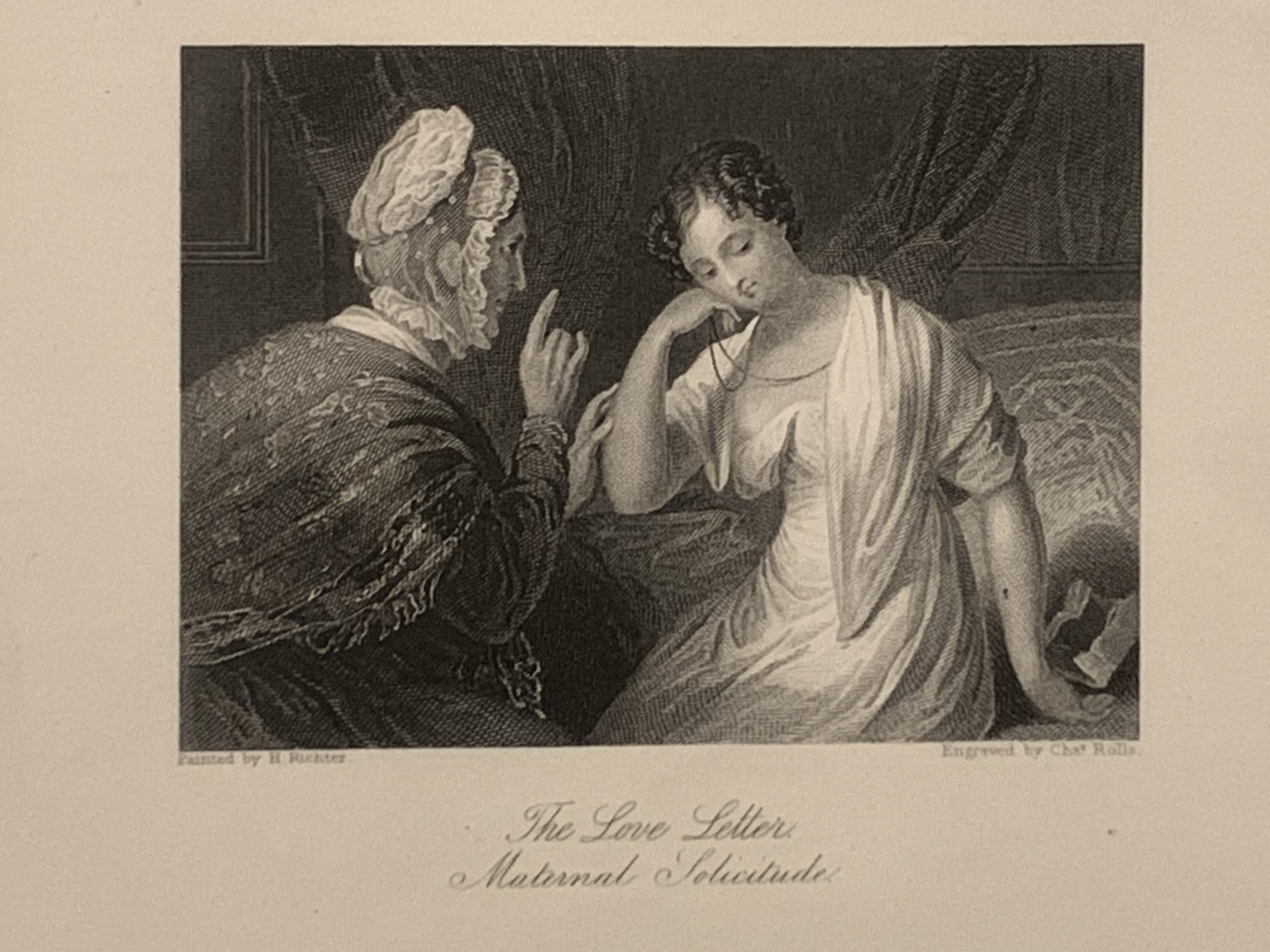
An engraving of Henry James Richter's painting, the Love Letter.

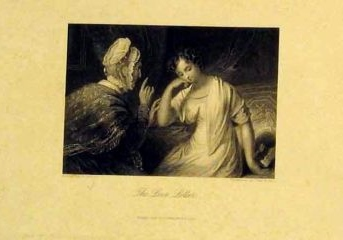
1843 The Love Letter by Henry James Richter

Rolls contributed by engraving a number of drawings and paintings done by Richter. It is believed that the painting may have been based on the drawing and subsequent engraving of a different view of the scene. This engraving has been referenced by the titles One Peep Was Enough (a short story by L. E. L.) and At the Post Office showing Mrs Mailsetter, Jenny and two other characters; Mrs Heukbane and Mrs Shortcake.

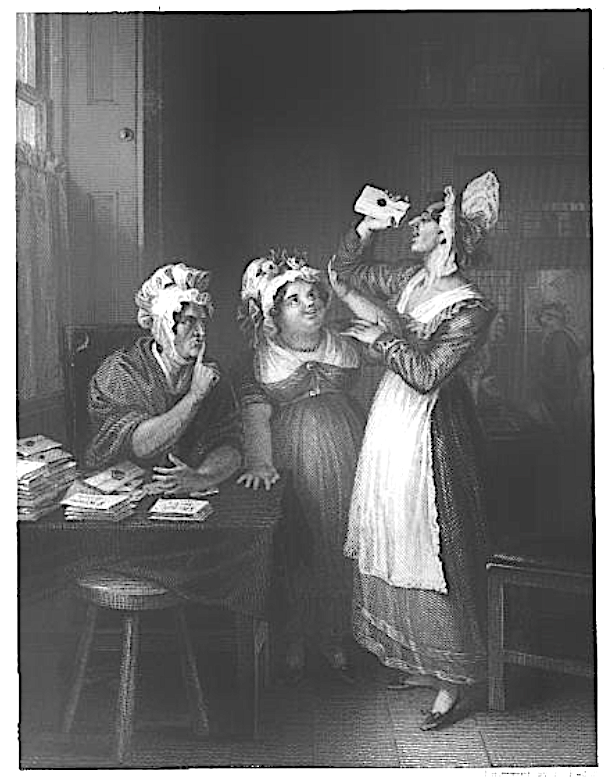
One Peep Was Enough

Richter was married twice: first, at Marylebone on 9 July 1808, to Elizabeth née Smith; and second, at Marylebone on 2 May 1818, to Charlotte Sophia née Edson (d. 1862). He had at least two sons and two daughters. On 8 April 1857, Henry James Richter died at his home at 101 Lisson Grove, London. He was 85. At the time of his death, he was translating a metaphysical work by J. S. Beck, a former student of Kant. His daughter Henrietta Sophia Richter (1813–1896) was a successful amateur portrait painter, who exhibited at the Royal Academy from 1842 to 1849. His son Henry Constantine Richter (1821–1902) became a well recognised draftsman and lithographer, noted for his illustrations of birds and mammals which were reproduced in the works of the English ornithologist and bird artist John Gould.
