= The Mammals of Australia =

Three-volume work written and published by John Gould

The Mammals of Australia is a three-volume work written and published by John Gould between 1845–63. It contains 182 illustrations by the author and its artist H. C. Richter. It was intended to be a complete survey of the novel species of mammals, such as the marsupials, discovered in the colonies of Australia.

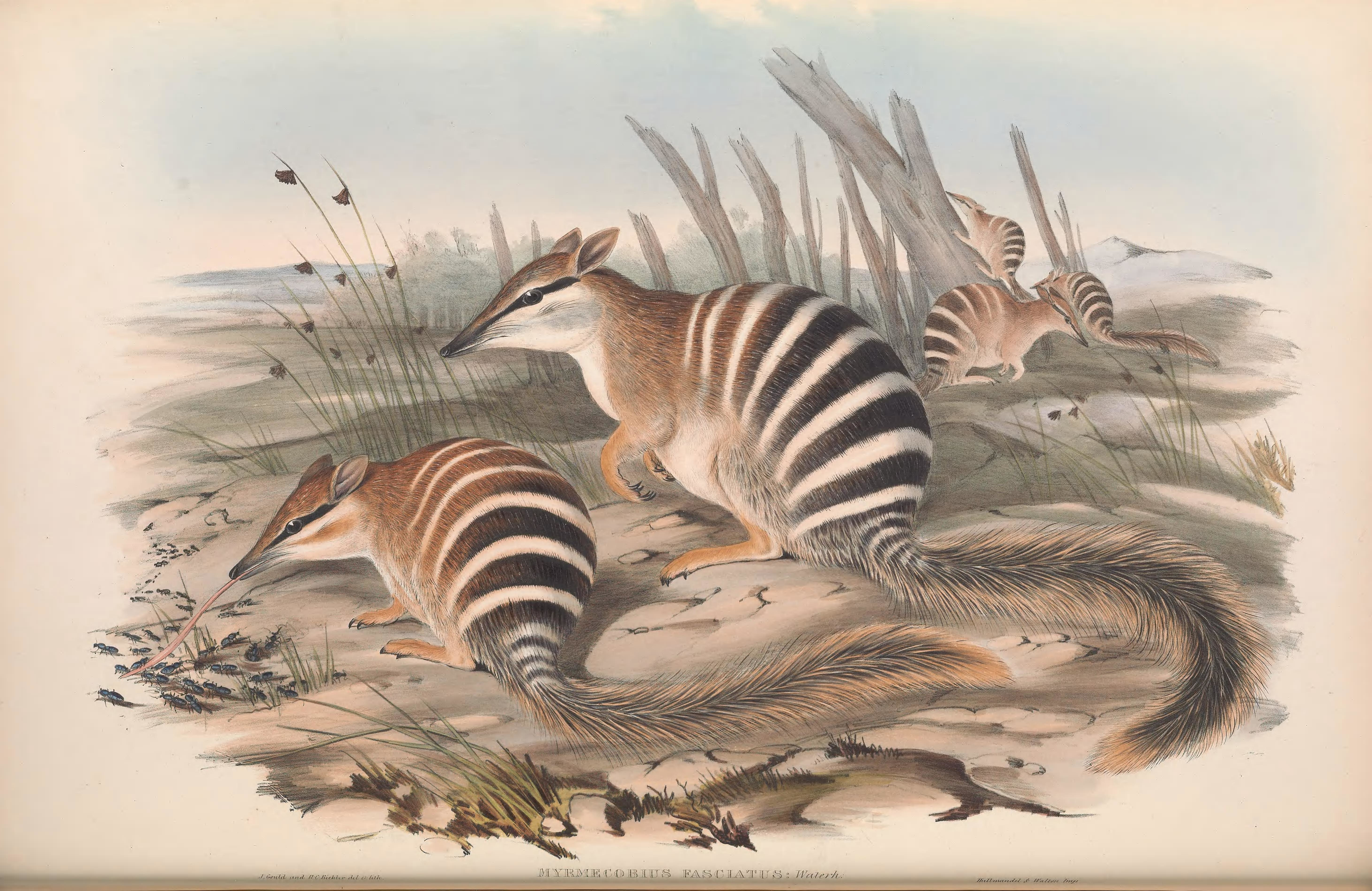
Plate from volume 1, Myrmecobius fasciatus

== Author ==
The author, John Gould, best known for The Birds of Australia and other major works of ornithology, visited Australia in 1838. In his introduction, Gould says:

It was not until I arrived in the country, and found myself surrounded by objects as strange as if I had been transported to another planet, that I conceived the idea of devoting a portion of my attention to the mammalian class of its extraordinary fauna.

During his short stay he made observations on the natural history and employed his skills as a taxidermist to obtain specimens.

== First survey ==
The publication of this major work by Gould followed his A Monograph of the Macropodidae or Family of Kangaroos in 1841. This work was the first comprehensive survey of Australian mammals, and gave an account of their classification and description. Gould also included the indigenous names for the species from the lists he made while in Australia. He used these names to make requests of the local peoples for his specimens, and recorded the regions where the names were used. This conserved a number of common names, such as dibbler (Parantechinus apicalis), which were later recommended by authorities.

== Artwork ==
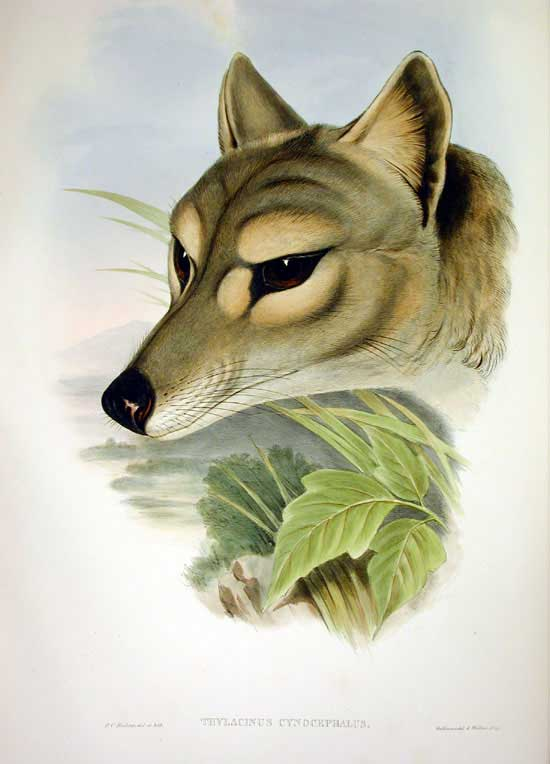
Iconic image of the thylacine

The large lithographs reproduced the artwork of Richter, after the drawings and watercolours made in Australia by Gould and his wife, Elizabeth. (The contribution by Elizabeth Gould was uncredited). These were hand-coloured by a group of artists, led by Gabriel Bayfield, that required the completion of 26,572 plates. The illustrations produced during their visit to Australia were supplemented by the preserved specimens returned to England and detailed the characteristics of the species. These illustrations have become iconic images of the mammals of Australia. Among the best known of the illustrations from the work are the two of Thylacinus cynocephalus (Tasmanian tiger), copied since its publication and the most frequently reproduced, made more recognizable by Cascade Brewery's appropriation for its label in 1987. The government of Tasmania published a monochromatic reproduction of the same image in 1934, the author Louisa Anne Meredith also copied it for Tasmanian Friends and Foes (1881).

== Subscription format ==
The Mammals of Australia was published by subscription in the format Imperial Folio; 13 parts in three volumes were issued from 1845 until 1863. To these the author added An Introduction to The Mammals of Australia (1863) in a separate work. This provided corrections and updates, a new preface, introduction, and a list of the mammals of the three volumes. The first two volumes were complete surveys of orders 'Marsupiata' (marsupials), and, with Rodentia in the third, it formed the sum of known mammalian species of Australia. With the addition of those contained in the later Introduction the total of species described reached 166. The same work notes the exclusion of marine mammals such as whales from the volumes, but reprints a manuscript by Charles Coxen on the dugong.

Beyond the scientific value of this comprehensive survey, the document is cited in reference to its subject's conservation. Some of the species included in the work, such as Onychogalea lunata (crescent nailtail wallaby), have since succumbed to changes in land use since European colonisation.

The work was received with acclaim, but the high cost of production, especially of the coloured plates, reduced its accessibility. The original listed price was £41 for the complete set of volumes. The public curiosity for the unique fauna of Australia was met by this handsomely illustrated and comprehensive survey, and it spawned imitations in Australia. The curator of the Australian Museum, Gerard Krefft, produced the more affordable The Mammals of Australia (1871); intended for educational purposes and influenced by Gould's illustrations. Gracius Broinowski's abandoned work, Birds and Mammals of Australia (1884), so closely imitated the plates that an injunction was threatened by its publisher.
