= Henry Constantine Richter =

British painter

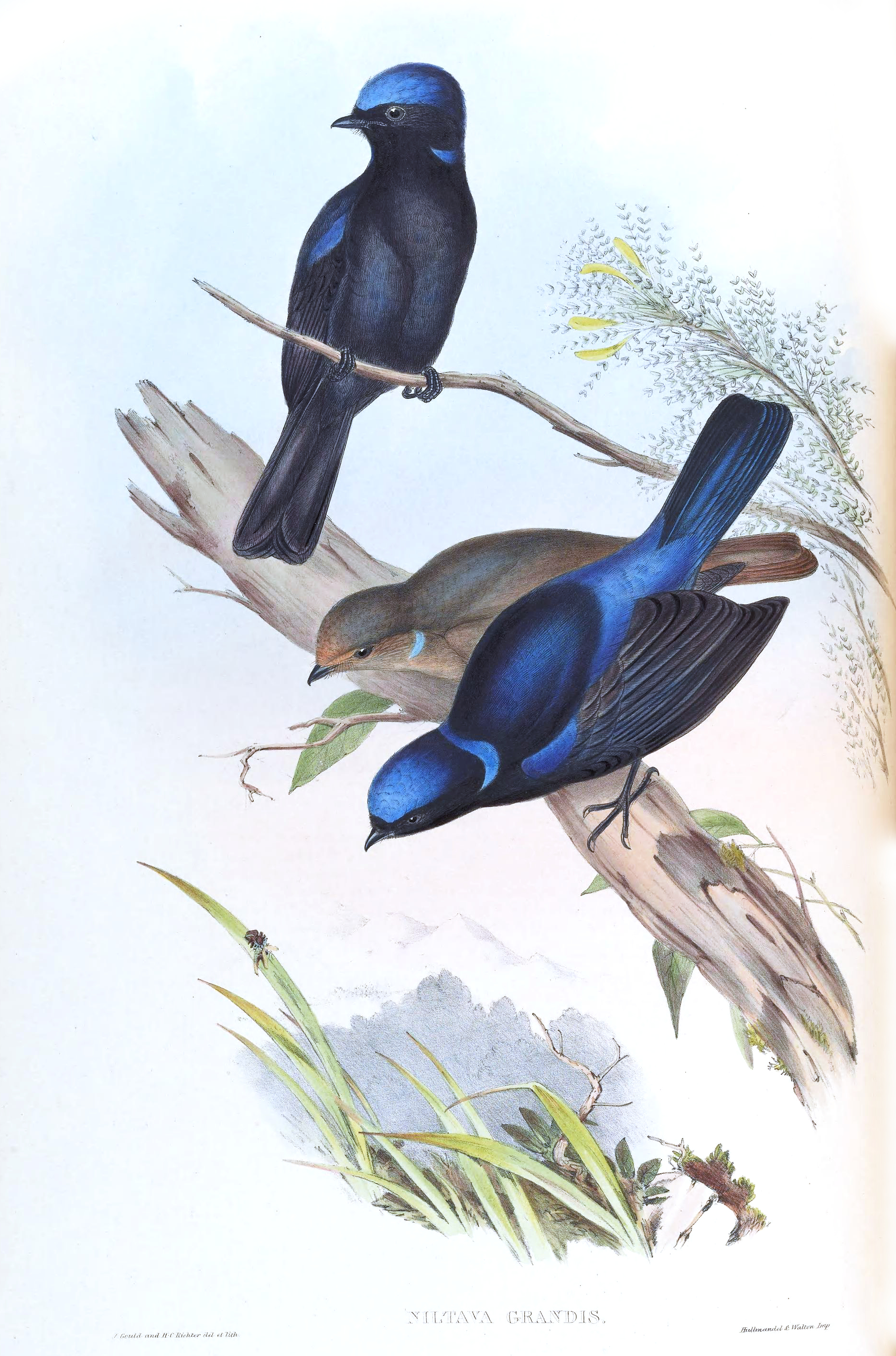
Large Niltava Niltava grandis, date between 1850 and 1883, The Birds of Asia, Volume 2, J. Gould and H. C. Richter

Henry Constantine Richter (7 June 1821 – 16 March 1902) was an English zoological illustrator who produced a very large number of skillful coloured lithographs of birds and mammals, mainly for the scientific books of the renowned English 19th century ornithologist John Gould.

Many of the original drawings used by Richter as the basis for his coloured lithographs were by Gould's wife, Elizabeth Coxen, produced before her death in 1841.

Richter's reputation was overshadowed by that of his much-celebrated employer. Since it was not customary to acknowledge illustrators alongside authors in the titles of publications, his name was forgotten. But in 1978, his great ability and the extent of his contribution to Gould's work came to light, in the work of the researcher Christine E. Jackson.

== Early years ==
Note:

(1) Henry Constantine Richter will be referred to as 'Richter' throughout this article, whereas full-length names will be used for each of his relatives, to reduce confusion.

(2) Where no citation is given in this section for the dates of birth, death, marriage and residence of the Richter family, the information can be accessed online from indexes of English registers in the Ancestry.com databases at https://www.ancestry.com

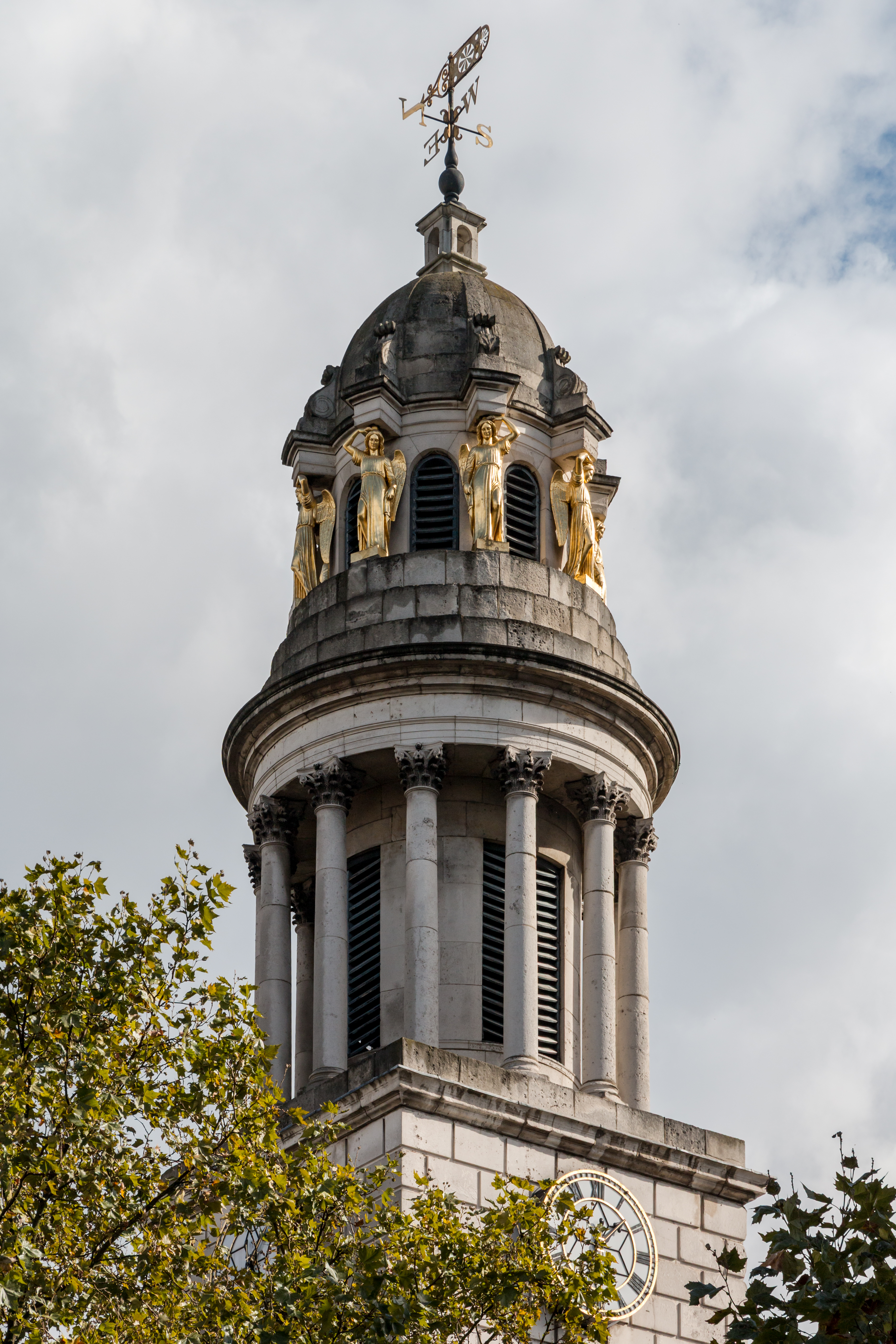
St. Marylebone Parish Church, London, England, completed 1817. Architect, Thomas Hardwick

Richter was born in Brompton, London in England on 7 Jun 1821, into an artistic family. His father, Henry James Richter (1772-1857), was a philosopher, painter and engraver who was born in Soho, Middlesex, England to Mary Haigh, the wife of John Augustus Richter, an immigrant from Dresden, Germany - himself an artist and engraver.

Richter's mother, Charlotte Sophia Edson (1793-1862), had married his father on 2 May 1818 in Marylebone, Middlesex, England. He was their first child. His birth was followed by that of his sister Antonia Charlotte (1823-1896) and his brother Charles (b.1827). A half-sister - Henrietta Sophia (1814-1896) had already been born to Henry James Richter's first wife, Elizabeth Smith (1787-1816), whom he had married on 9 July 1808, and lost after eight years' marriage.

Henry James Richter became a well-respected and popular artist - he was a member, and president (1811-1812), of the Associated Artists in Water Colours, exhibiting frequently. He was also elected to membership of the Society of Painters in Oil and Water Colours. Several of his works are owned by the British Museum.

Artistic talent also flourished elsewhere in Richter's family: his half-sister, Henrietta Sophia, became a successful miniature portrait artist, and exhibited at the prestigious Royal Academy of Arts in London, 1842–1849.

The English census returns indicate that the Richters were a close-knit family. For example, in 1851, the 30 year-old Richter was still living with his parents. Henry James Richter did not own a house, but always lived in rented accommodation. In that year, when he was aged 79, his household consisted of: his wife, Charlotte Sophia, his adult son, both of his adult daughters and one servant. This arrangement may have been out of financial necessity as much as family affection - artist and lithographers were paid very little. As related by Jackson (p. 48), one practitioner, GJ Keulmans, wrote of his remuneration: "it has just saved me from starvation and nothing else".

== The technique of lithography ==
Richter's work with his coloured lithographs was breaking new ground at the time. The technique was labour-intensive and demanded great skill and attention to minute detail.

The University of Tasmanian explains the process that artists use to produce a lithograph from an image, such as a sketch, a drawing or a painting:

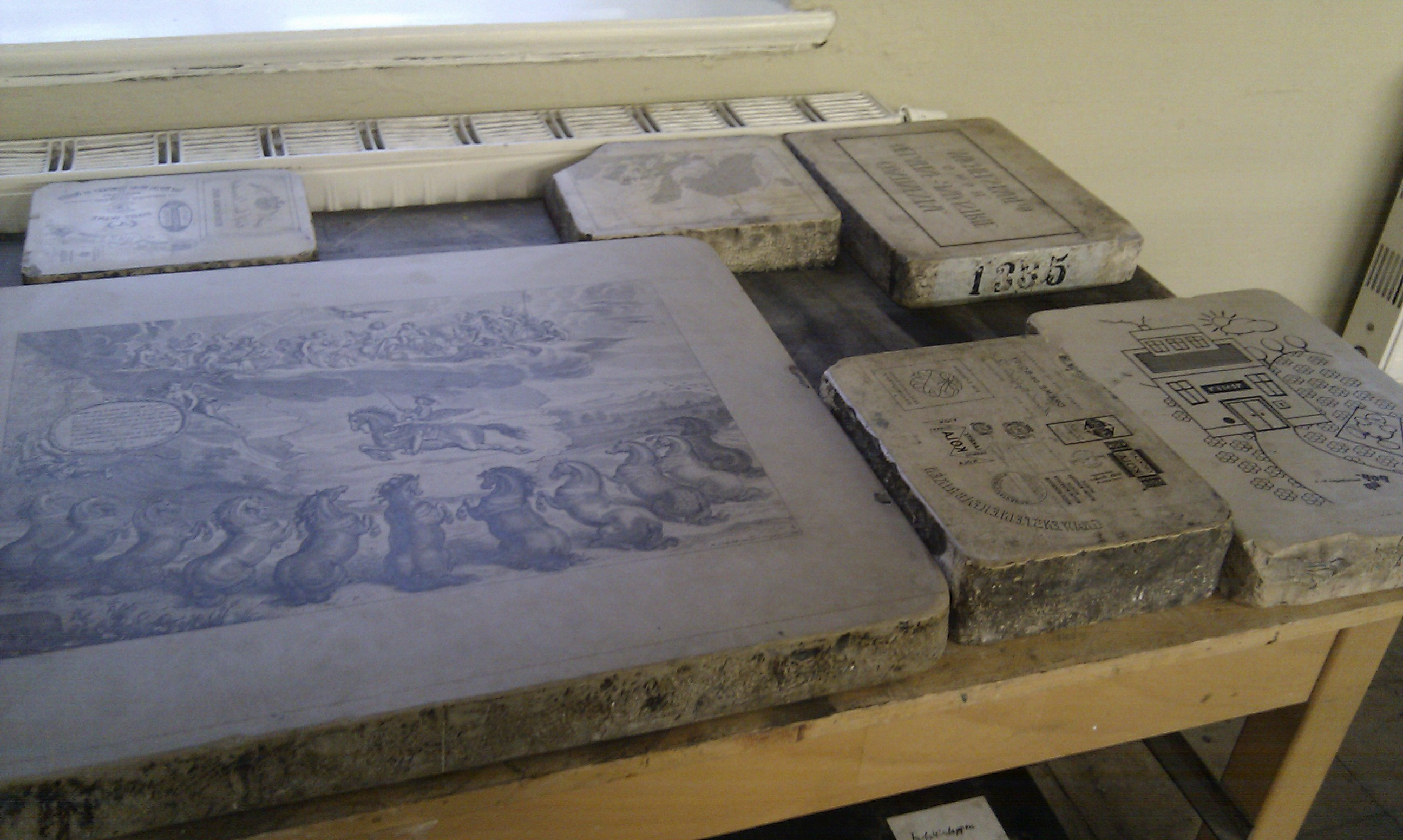
Lithographic stones, Museum of the Printing Arts, Leipzig, Germany

Lithography is essentially a chemical process. A drawing is made with a greasy crayon on limestone, then gum arabic and nitrate acid is rubbed into the material, changing its molecular structure so that when ink is applied it adheres to the crayon marks, but not the stone. Fine details are more difficult to achieve, but tonal qualities are easily suggested and it is possible for a drawing to be made directly onto the stone. The result is a more spontaneous impression, with the broad, fluid lines of a crayon and tonal planes producing a much softer or subtler result than that produced by the black and white linear imprint of engravings. - University of Tasmania.

John Gould was an experienced taxidermist, using his skill to preserve the skins of birds from his various worldwide expeditions. These skins were used by his artists to guide their illustrations, together with initial sketches made by Gould to indicate his requirements for the exact appearance of the finished images. The London Zoo was opened to the public in 1847 and was a further source of models of birds and animals for Richter's drawings.

== Career ==
Richter's earliest published bird illustrations were three plates in the book Genera of birds (1844–1849) by George Robert Gray. The plates depicted the Indian Barn Owl Strix javanica, the head and claws of two other owls, and a member of the pheasant and partridge family, Clapperton's spurfowl Pternistis clappertoni. His illustrations attracted the favourable attention of ornithologists.

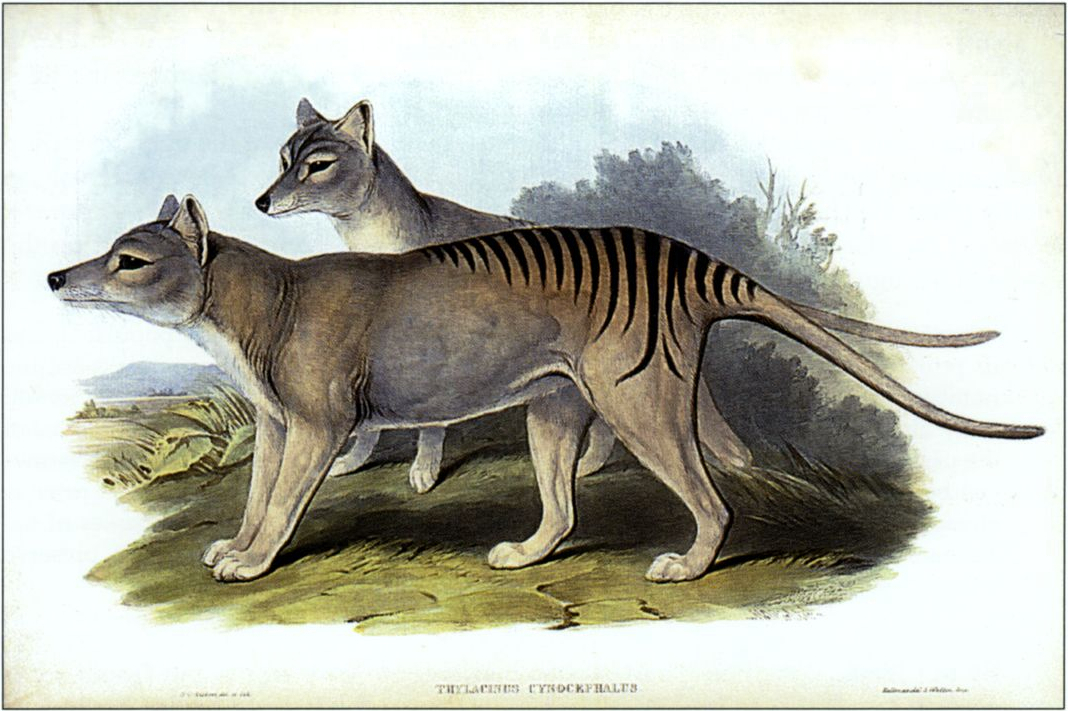
Tasmanian tiger Thylacinus cynocephalus, 1841, Plate 54 of Mammals of Australia, vol.I, J.Gould & H.C. Richter. The thylacine became extinct in 1936

In 1841 Richter was contacted by the zoologist John Gould, who urgently needed an illustrator, after the death of his wife Elizabeth Coxen (1804-1841), because he had committed to producing various parts of his lavish books on certain dates. The Gould-Richter working relationship lasted for forty years, until Gould died in 1881. Richter created about 3,000 lithographic plates and watercolours for Gould. Other illustrators employed by Gould included Edward Lear, William Matthew Hart and Joseph Wolf, although it was Richter who produced the vast majority of the works during Gould's lifetime.

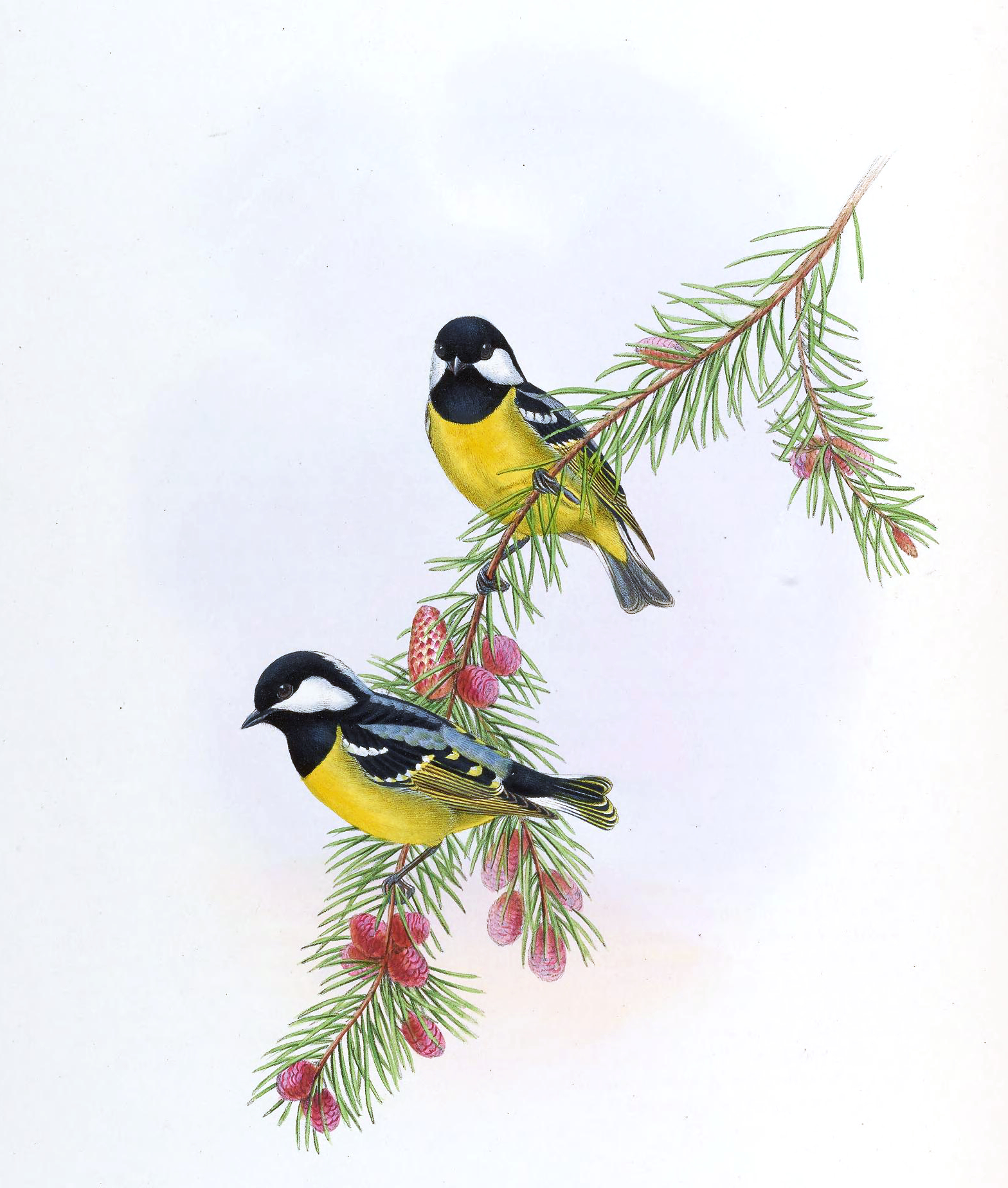
Yellow-bellied Tit Parus venustulus, between 1850 and 1883, The Birds of Asia. Volume 2, J. Gould & H.C. Richter

Amongst his best known illustrations are those of the male and female thylacine, from Gould's Mammals of Australia (1845–63) - frequently copied since publication. For example, an Australian company Cascade Brewery used the image on the label for one of their brands of beer, in 1987. Previously, the Tasmanian Government had published a monochromatic reproduction of the same image, in 1934 and, earlier still, the author Louisa Anne Meredith also copied it for Tasmanian Friends and Foes (1881).

In his will, John Gould wrote "I bequeath to my Artist H C Richter a legacy of £100 as a kind remembrance for the purchase of a [mourning] ring or any other article that he may prefer". He seems to have been unconcerned about the impecunious state of his 60-year-old artist, although Richter had contributed so materially to his own prosperity for over four decades.

After Gould's death Richter gained a small amount of work for Gray's Birds of Asia, and he prepared a plate for Sir Richard Owen's Memoirs on the extinct wingless birds of New Zealand (1878—1879 ). Work already completed by him was used in Gould's books that were published posthumously, such as Birds of Asia, but new plates for the books were commissioned from William Hart.

== Final years ==
Lacking a regular income after the death of Gould, Richter became dependent upon his sister, Antonia Charlotte, who had married a wealthy Nottinghamshire farmer with property in Ranby, Henry Francis Noble Champion. Antonia Champion had become a widow in 1854, one year after her marriage, and she inherited her husband's London residence in the Lisson Grove area of London. She continued to live there alone with a servant, and did not marry again.

After John Gould's death Antonia Champion took in her brother and their half-sister Henrietta Sophia Richter. Since Henry James Richter's death in 1857 they had been living in pauper's lodgings in the Lisson Grove area, with their mother whilst she was alive.

When Antonia Champion died in 1896, the house passed to Richter, and he stayed there until his death. The probate administration record states that he died 16 March 1902, and that administration occurred 17 April 1902. His estate was valued at just under 840 pounds.

Nothing is known of the life of Richter's younger brother, Charles Richter, beyond a mention in the English Census of 1841, when he was 14 years of age and living with his parents. In 1896, Richter had lost not only his sister, Antonia Charlotte Champion (in January), but also his half-sister, Henrietta Sophia Richter (in October), and since none of them had children, the Richter family line appears to have ended with the passing of Henry Constantine Richter.

== Works illustrated ==
Jackson (pp. 13–14) lists the 1,600+ hand-coloured plates drawn by Richter as follows:

- Gray, George Robert, Genera of bird', 1844-1849, 3 vols.

In Vol I plate XV, Strix javanica HCR del.
In Vol I plate 15, Head and claws of Phodius badicus & Strix flammea HCR del.
In Vol III Francolinus clappertoni HCR del.

- Gould, John, Birds of Australia, 1840-1848, 600 plates, & Supplement, 1851-1869, 81 plates, HCR after 1841 (when Mrs Gould died) del. & lith.
- Gould, Joh, Monograph of the Odontophorinae or partridges of America, 1844-50, 32 plates JG & HCR del. & lith.
- Proceedings of the Zoological Society of London, plates drawn and lith. by HCR.

1848 Aves Pl.I Trochilus (Helianthea) eos Gould

Pl.II Trochilus (Heliangelus) mavors Gould
Pl.IV Cinclosoma castaneothorax Gould

1849 Pl. XII Ptiloris Victoriae Gould

1850 (opp. P. 212) Notornis Mantelli Owen

- Transactions of the Zoological Society of London Plate drawn by HCR.

1849, iii: 379-380 Gould J. On a new species of Genus Apteryx. Plate accompanying text Apterux owenii

- Gould, John, Monograph of the Trochilidae, or family of humming-birds, 1849-1861.

5 vols, 360 plates, JG & HCR del. et lith.

- Gould, John, A monograph of the Ramphastidae or family of toucans: Supplement, 1855.

21 plates, JG & HCR, 2nd ed, 1852-1854, 52 plates JG & HCR del. & lith.

- Gould, John, A monograph of the Trogonidae or family of trogons 2nd ed., 1858-1875.

47 plates, JG & W. Hart & HCR del. & lith.

- Gould, John, Birds of Asia, 1850-1883, 7 vols. Approx. 500 plates JG & HCR and J. Wolf & HCR.
- Gould, John, The birds of Great Britain, 1862-1873, 5 vols, 367 plates. Artists JG, HCR & J. Wolf.
- Owen, Richard, Memoirs on the extinct wingless birds of New Zealand, 1878-1879.

1 large folded plate depicting Notornis mantelli, JG & HCR del & lith.

- Gould, John, A monograph of the Pittidae, edited by R. B. Sharpe, 1880.

10 plates from other Gould titles, including 3 plates JG & HCR del. * lith.

Note: Jackson's list omits Mammals of Australia, 1845–1863, though it is not clear whether this was intentional or not. Certainly his contribution of illustrations for the book was significant.

== A selection of illustrations by Richter ==
Unlike paintings, lithographs in Richter's time tended not to be dated by the artist, so it is normal to use the publication date of the book in which the lithograph was printed.

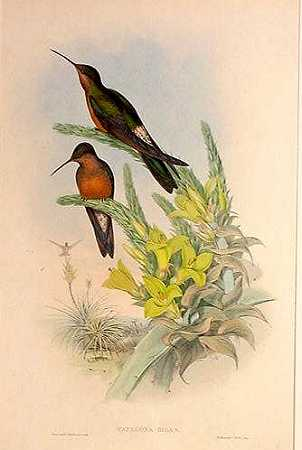
Giant Hummingbird, Patagona gigas, 1887, A Monograph of the Trochilidæ, or Family of Hummingbirds, J Gould & H.C. Richter

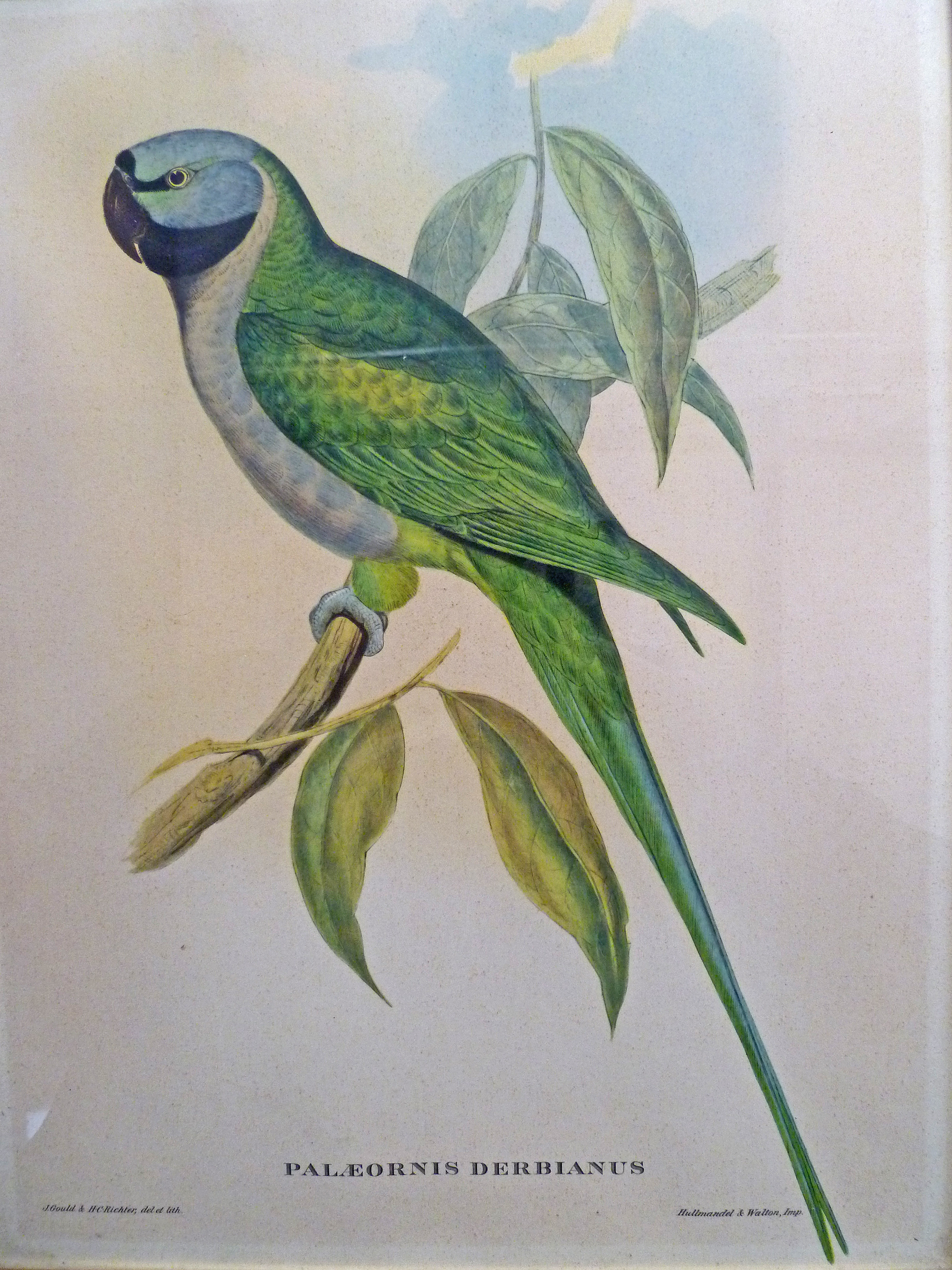
Lord Derby's Parakeet, Psittacula derbiana, J. Gould & H.C. Richter

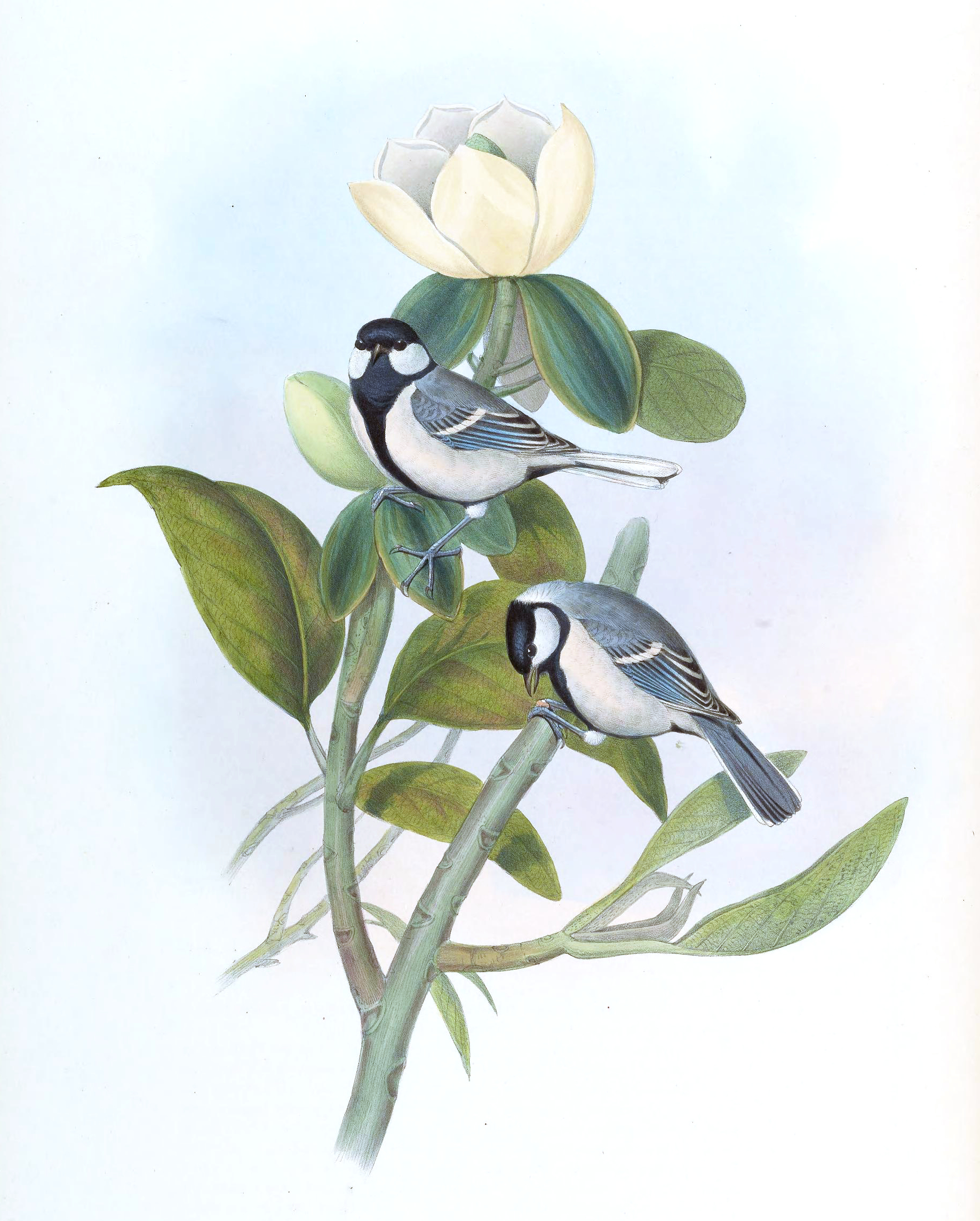
Cinereous Tit, Parus cinereus, between 1850 and 1883, Birds of Asia, Volume 2, J Gould & H. C. Richter

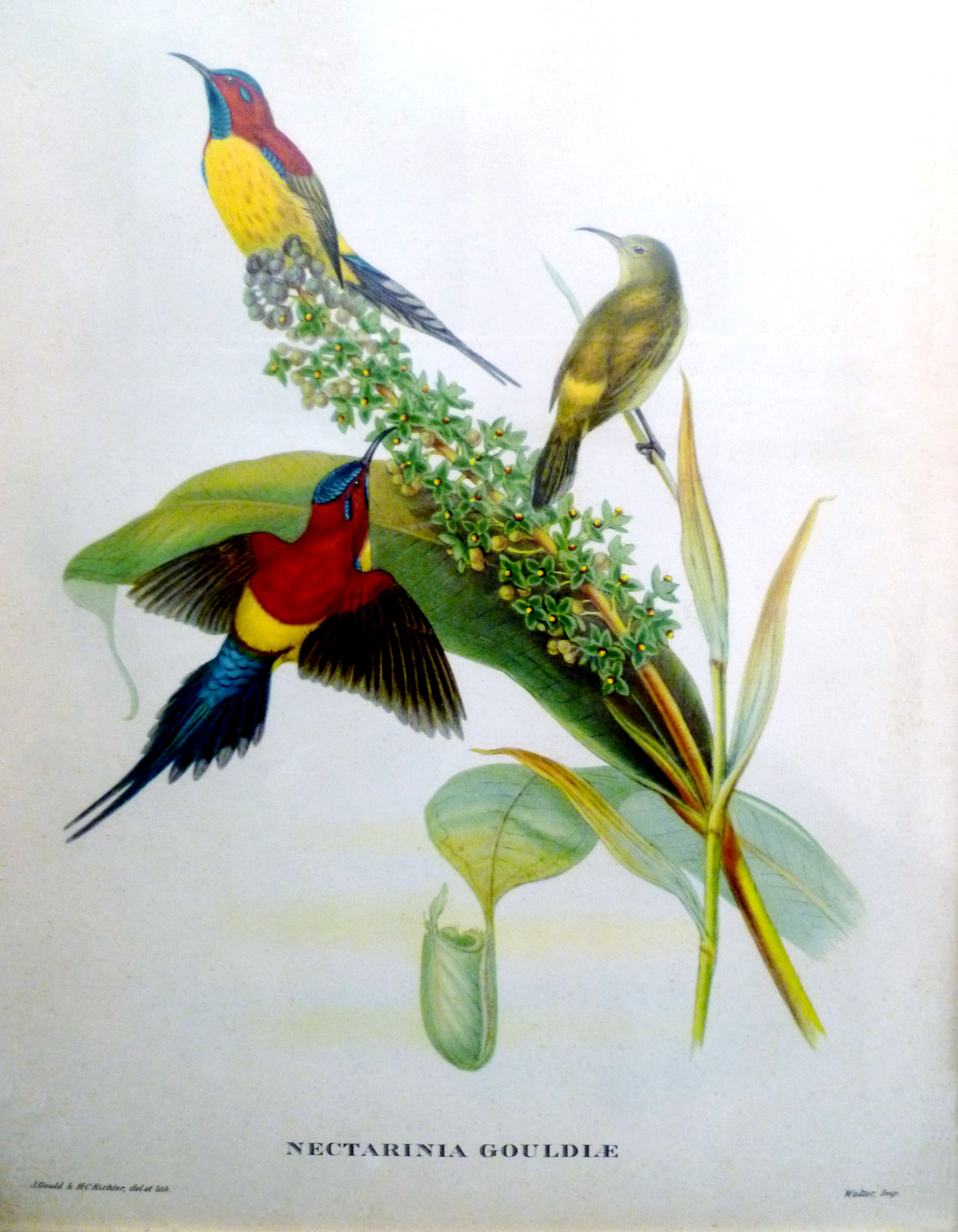
Mrs Gould's Sunbird, Aethopyga gouldiae, J Gould & H.C. Richter

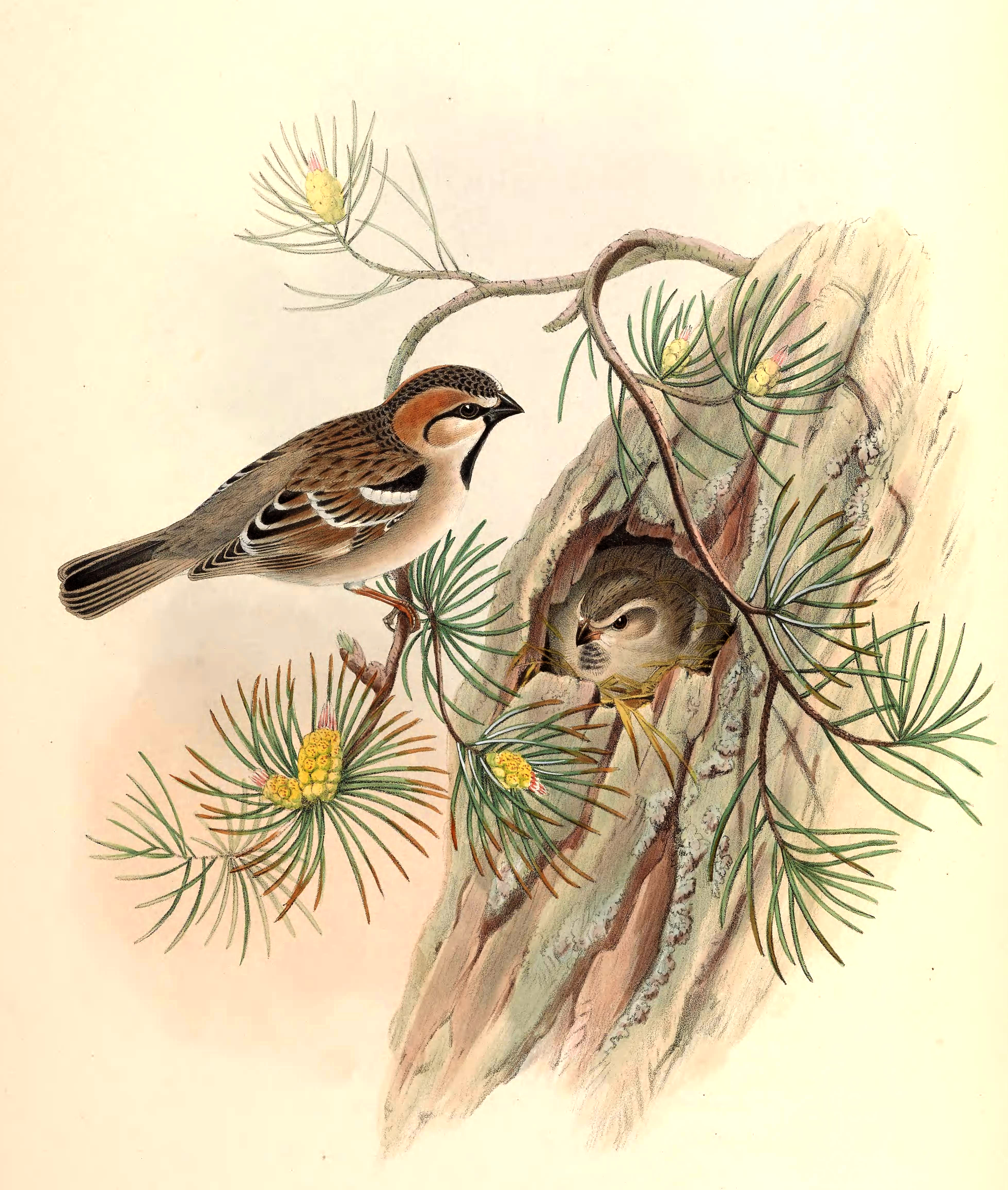
Saxual Sparrow, Passer ammodendri, Birds of Asia, Volume V, J Gould and H. C. Richter

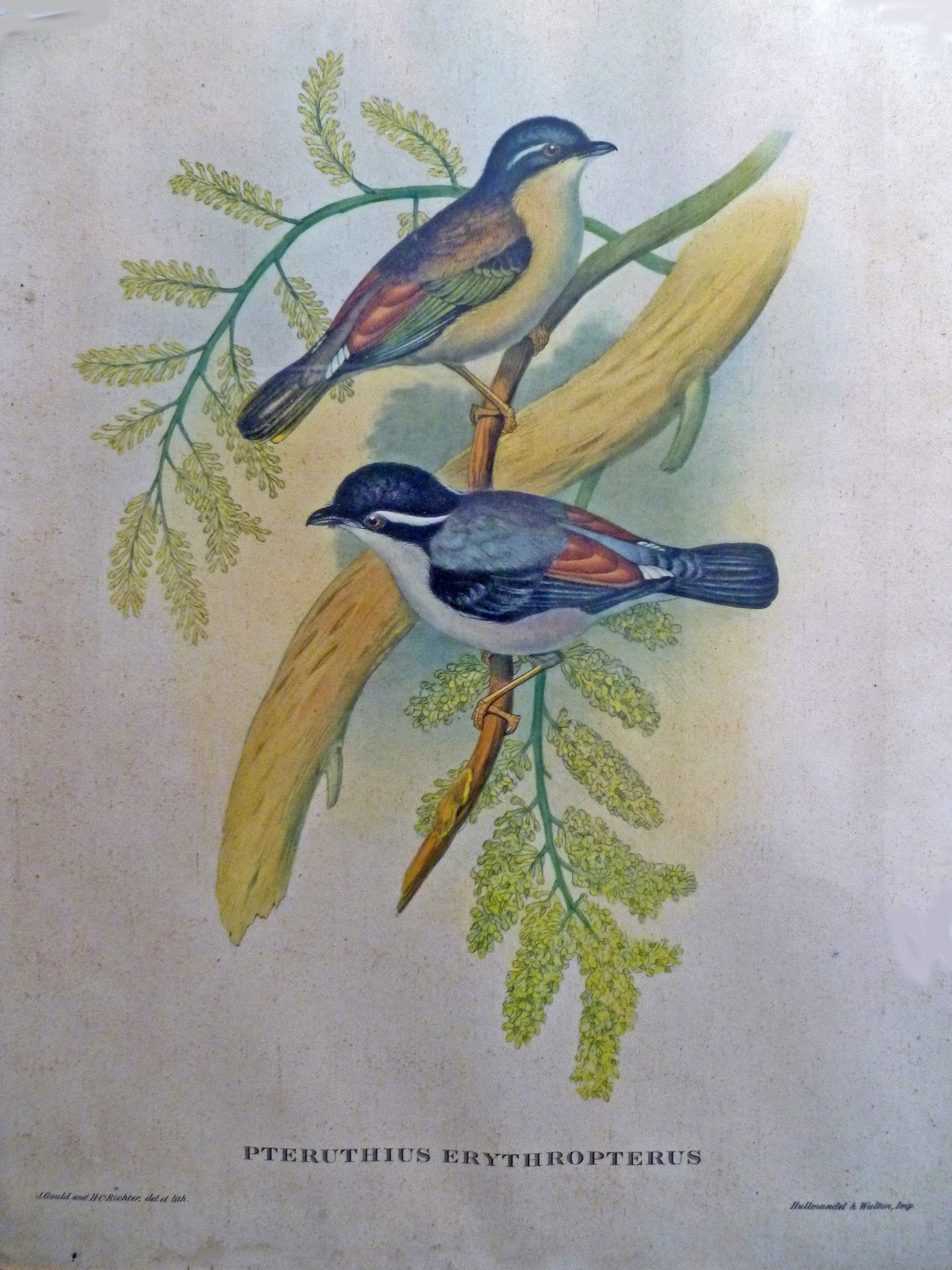
Himalayan Shrike-babbler, Pteruthius ripleyi, J. Gould & H.C. Richter

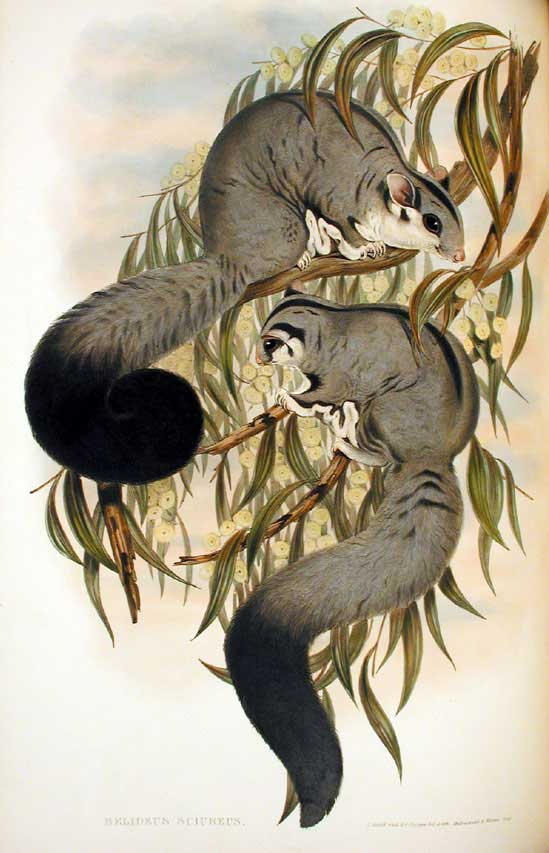
Squirrel Glider, Petaurus norfolcensis, 1845–1863, Mammals of Australia, J Gould & H. C. Richter

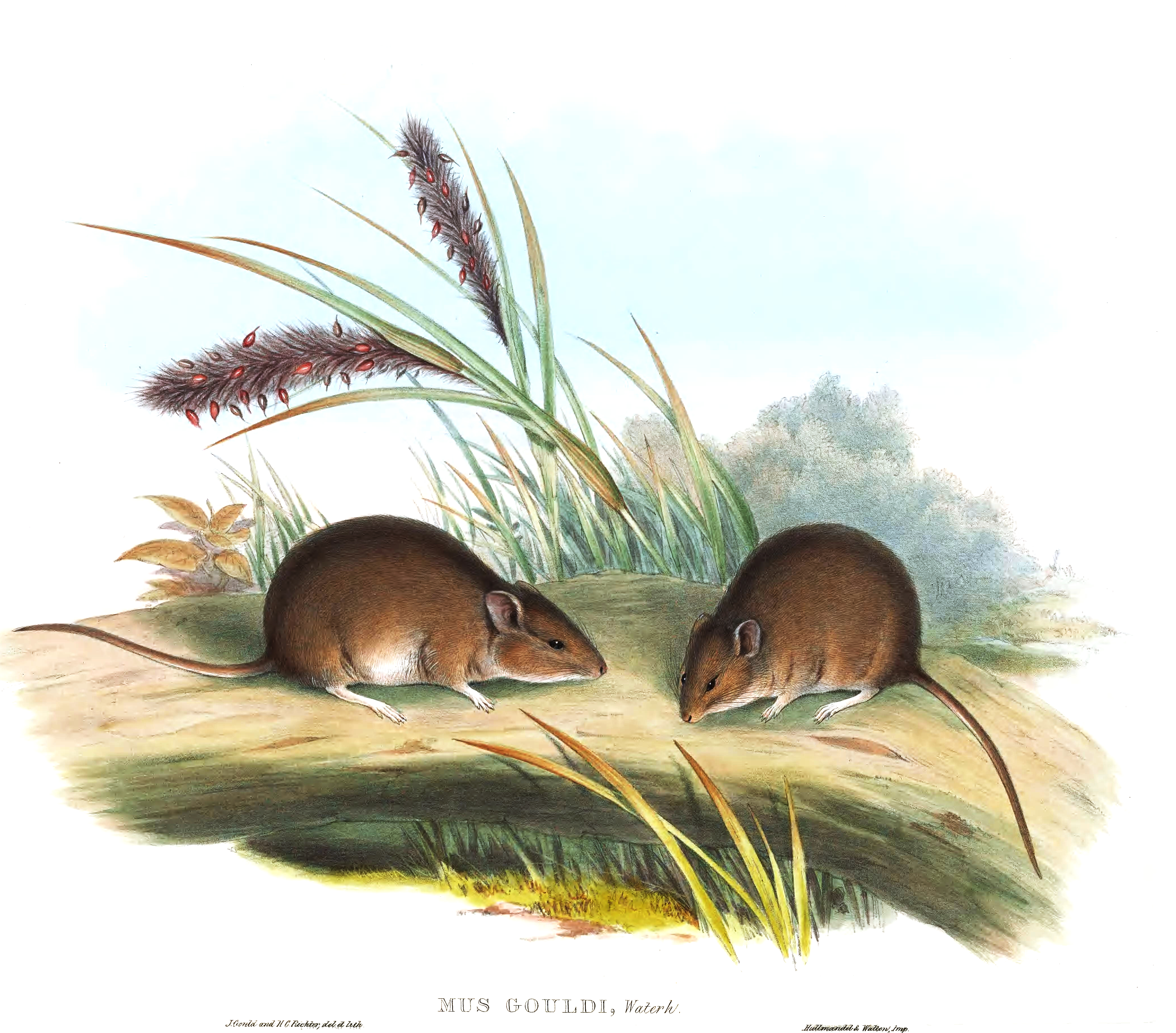
Gould's Mouse, Pseudomys gouldii, 1863, Mammals of Australia, J Gould & H. C. Richter

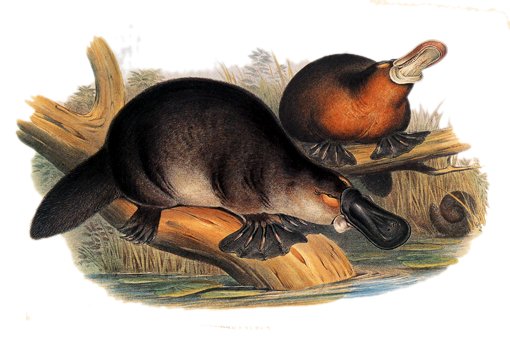
Duckbilled Platypus, Ornithorhynchus anatinus, 1845–1863, Mammals of Australia, Gould & H. C. Richter

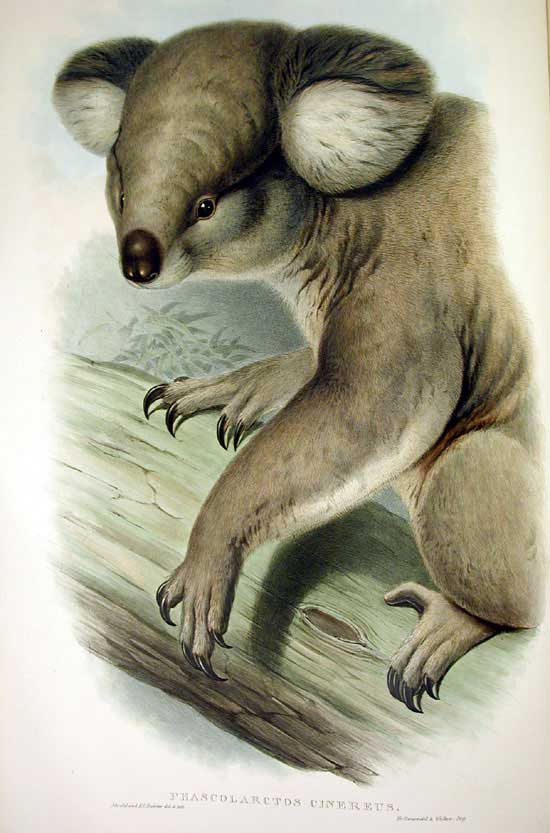
Koala, Phascolarctus cinereus, 1845–1863, Mammals of Australia, J Gould & H. C. Richter

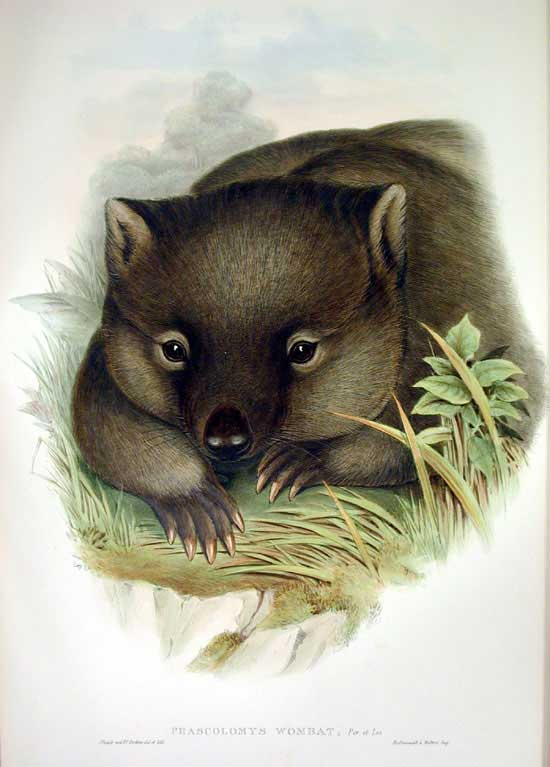
Common Wombat, Vombatus ursinus, 1845–1863, Mammals of Australia, J Gould & H. C. Richter

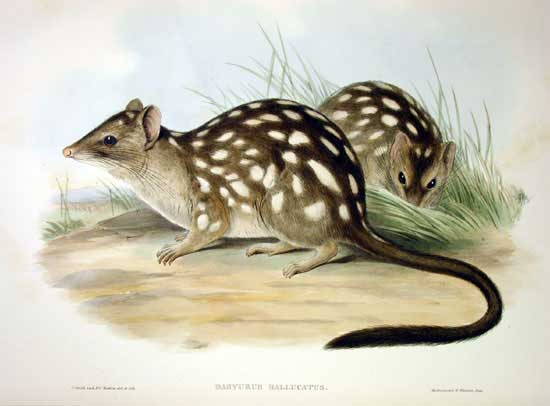
Northern Quoll, Dasyurus hallucatus, 1845–1863, Mammals of Australia, J Gould & H. C. Richter
