= Hypsiprymnodon karenblackae =

Hypsiprymnodon karenblackae Temporal range: Early Miocene, 18.5-17.0 Ma

Scientific classification
- Kingdom: Animalia
- Phylum: Chordata
- Class: Mammalia
- Infraclass: Marsupialia
- Order: Diprotodontia
- Family: Hypsiprymnodontidae
- Genus: Hypsiprymnodon
- Species: †H. karenblackae

Binomial name
- †Hypsiprymnodon karenblackae Bates, et al. 2014.

Extinct species of marsupial

Hypsiprymnodon karenblackae is an extinct species of small macropod marsupial that inhabited northwestern Australia during the Early Miocene. It is known from an upper jaw bone that was found at the Riversleigh World Heritage Area. It is considered to be one of the earliest Hypsiprymnodon species known. Much like its closest living relative, the musky rat-kangaroo, it was frugivorous.

== Discovery and naming ==
The holotype specimen of Hypsiprymnodon karenblackae, QMF 24152, consists of a left maxilla preserving the entire cheek tooth row that was recovered from the Camel Sputum site, which is classified as a Faunal Zone B deposit at the Riversleigh World Heritage Area, northwestern Queensland. The site has been radiometrically dated to the Early Miocene, ~18.5-17.0 Ma. It was described as a new species of musky rat-kangaroo by Hayley Bates and colleagues in 2014. In the same publication, the authors also described Hypsiprymndon philcreaseri and Hypsiprymnodon dennisi.

The specific epithet was chosen by the authors to honour Dr. Karen Black, in recognition for her significant contributions to palaeontology in Australia, especially the Riversleigh fossils, and for being an inspirational success as a female scientific researcher.

== Description ==
The holotype maxilla preserves a small portion of the jugal process just above the first upper molar, which is robust in appearance. The opening for the infraorbital foramen (a hole in the skull) is positioned in front of and above the third upper premolar. When viewed from below, the longitudinal axis of the premolar is flexed buccally (towards the outer side of the tooth) to the point where it is misaligned with the molar row. This separates it from Hypsiprymnodon moschatus and Hypsiprymnodon bartholomaii. The premolar itself is plagiaulacoid, with the ridge running lengthwise across the middle of the tooth being intersected by eight ridgelets, known as transcristae, and their corresponding cusps. The molars decrease in size as they progress towards the back of the skull, and are low crowned and bunolophodont. Unlike all other species of Hypsiprymnodon, the first upper molar possesses a lingual precingulum (small crest), parastyle and a small stylar cusp D. Both the second and third molars, however, have a reduced lingual precingulum, while the parastyle is reduced to a fossa on the second molar and stylar cusp D is absent on the third.

== Classification ==
Bates and colleagues conducted a phylogenetic analysis to determine the affinities of Hypsiprymnodon karenblackae using a slightly modified version of the dataset published by Kear and Pledge (2007). In their strict consensus tree, they found that H. karenblackae formed an unresolved polytomy with several other species of Hypsiprymnodon and propleopines at the base of Macropodoidea. The authors noted that, although Hypsiprymnodon wasn't recovered as monophyletic in their analysis, H. karenblackae can be referred to the genus based on very close morphological similarity. The phylogenetic tree of Bates and colleagues (2014) is reproduced below:

- Macropodoidea
  - †Ekaltadeta ima
  - Hypsiprymnodon moschatus
  - †Hypsiprymnodon philcreaseri
  - †Hypsiprymnodon dennisi
  - †Hypsiprymnodon karenblackae
  - †Hypsiprymnodon bartholomaii
  - †Jackmahoneya toxoniensis
  - †Propleopus oscillans
  - Balbaridae
    - †Nambaroo gillespieae
    - - †Balbaroo fangaroo
      - - †Ganawamaya acris
        - †Wururoo dayamayi
  - - †Bettongia moyesi
    - Bettongia penicillata
    - †Bulungamaya delicata
    - †Ganguroo bilamina
    - †Ngamaroo archeri
    - †Nowidgee matrix
    - Potorous tridactylus
    - †Purtia mosaicus
    - †Wabularoo naughtoni
    - †Wakiewakie lawsoni
    - †Wanburoo hilarus
    - - Dendrolagus lumholtzi
      - Dorcopsis muelleri
      - †Dorcopsoides fossilis
      - Sthenurinae
        - †Hadronomas puckridgi
        - †Rhizosthenurus flanneryi
        - - †Procoptodon goliah
          - †Simosthenurus occidentalis
      - Macropodinae
        - Thylogale thetis
        - - Macropus rufus
          - Petrogale penicillata
          - Wallabia bicolor

== Paleobiology ==
Hypsiprymnodon karenblackae was recovered from the Early Miocene-aged Camel Sputum site at the Riversleigh World Heritage Area, making it one of the oldest known Hypsiprymnodon species. At this point in time, the Riversleigh area had a tropical climate and was covered in rainforest habitat. H. blackae lived alongside another species of musky rat-kangaroo, Hypsiprymnodon philcreaseri. Other contemporaneous fauna include the propleopine Ekaltadeta ima; the balbarids Ganawamaya acris and Balbaroo gregoriensis; the basal macropodids Bulungamaya delicata and Gumardee pascuali; the thylacinids Ngamalacinus timmulvaneyi and Wabulacinus ridei; the wynyardiid Namilamadeta crassirostrum; the palorchestid Propalorchestes novaculacephalus; and the diprotodontids Ngapakaldia bonythoni and Neohelos stirtoni.

The morphology of the teeth suggests that Hypsiprymnodon karenblackae likely had a very similar diet and ecology to the modern musky rat-kangaroo (Hypsiprymnodon moschatus), being predominantly frugivorous and also opportunistically omnivorous.
