= Hypsiprymnodon dennisi =

Hypsiprymnodon dennisi Temporal range: Middle Miocene

Scientific classification
- Kingdom: Animalia
- Phylum: Chordata
- Class: Mammalia
- Infraclass: Marsupialia
- Order: Diprotodontia
- Family: Hypsiprymnodontidae
- Genus: Hypsiprymnodon
- Species: †H. dennisi

Binomial name
- †Hypsiprymnodon dennisi Bates, et al. 2014.

Extinct species of marsupial

Hypsiprymnodon dennisi is an extinct species of small macropod marsupial that inhabited Australia during the Middle Miocene. It is known from several skull bones that were found at the Riversleigh World Heritage Area in north-western Queensland. Much like its closest living relative, the musky rat-kangaroo, it was frugivorous.

== Discovery and naming ==
Hypsiprymnodon dennisi was named and described, alongside Hypsiprymnodon philcreaseri and Hypsiprymnodon karenblackae, by Hayley Bates and colleagues in 2014. Its holotype specimen, QM F20840, is a left maxilla preserving the entire cheek tooth row that was recovered from the Cleft of Ages 4 site, which is classified as a Faunal Zone C deposit at the Riversleigh World Heritage Area, north-western Queensland. The site has been interpreted as being Middle Miocene in age. Several dentaries and isolated teeth from the same site were also referred to this taxon.

The specific epithet was chosen by the authors to honour Dr. Andrew Dennis for his research contributions towards the biology of the living musky rat-kangaroo.

== Description ==
The holotype maxilla preserves a small portion of the jugal process above the first upper molar. Compared to Hypsiprymnodon bartholomaii and Hypsiprymnodon philcreaseri, the process is wider and more robust. When viewed from below, the longitudinal axis of the upper third premolar is flexed anterobuccally (towards the front of the cheek) to the point where it is misaligned with the molar row. The premolar itself is relatively long and robust compared to those of other species of Hypsiprymnodon. It is also plagiaulacoid, with nine ridgelets (transcristae) and cusps intersecting along the ridge running lengthwise across the middle of the tooth. The occlusal surface of the premolar overhangs the front margin of the first upper molar. The molars are low crowned and bunolophodont, having rounded cusps and prominent ridges running transversely along (across) their occlusal surfaces. Unlike all other species of Hypsiprymnodon, the first upper molar possesses both a protostyle and stylar cusp C.

Lower jaw bones referred to Hypsiprymnodon dennisi include QM F24621, which is the most complete dentary referable to this taxon. It retains all of its teeth, with the exception of the first lower incisor, which are all heavily worn. A small foramen is present on the underside of the dentary below the masseteric fossa. Unlike the upper third premolar, the lower third premolar has eight transcristids and cuspids along the middle of the tooth. A protostylid is present on the first lower molar, but is absent on all other lower molars. The talonid basin shows a decrease in size from the first to the fourth lower molar.

== Classification ==
In its initial description, Bates and colleagues conducted a phylogenetic analysis to determine the affinities of Hypsiprymnodon dennisi using a slightly modified version of the dataset published by Kear and Pledge (2007). In their strict consensus tree, they found that H. dennisi formed an unresolved polytomy with several other species of Hypsiprymnodon and propleopines at the base of Macropodoidea. The authors noted that, although Hypsiprymnodon wasn't recovered as monophyletic in their analysis, H. dennisi can be referred to the genus based on very close morphological similarity. The phylogenetic tree of Bates and colleagues (2014) is reproduced below:

- Macropodoidea
  - †Ekaltadeta ima
  - Hypsiprymnodon moschatus
  - †Hypsiprymnodon philcreaseri
  - †Hypsiprymnodon dennisi
  - †Hypsiprymnodon karenblackae
  - †Hypsiprymnodon bartholomaii
  - †Jackmahoneya toxoniensis
  - †Propleopus oscillans
  - Balbaridae
    - †Nambaroo gillespieae
    - - †Balbaroo fangaroo
      - - †Ganawamaya acris
        - †Wururoo dayamayi
  - - †Bettongia moyesi
    - Bettongia penicillata
    - †Bulungamaya delicata
    - †Ganguroo bilamina
    - †Ngamaroo archeri
    - †Nowidgee matrix
    - Potorous tridactylus
    - †Purtia mosaicus
    - †Wabularoo naughtoni
    - †Wakiewakie lawsoni
    - †Wanburoo hilarus
    - - Dendrolagus lumholtzi
      - Dorcopsis muelleri
      - †Dorcopsoides fossilis
      - Sthenurinae
        - †Hadronomas puckridgi
        - †Rhizosthenurus flanneryi
        - - †Procoptodon goliah
          - †Simosthenurus occidentalis
      - Macropodinae
        - Thylogale thetis
        - - Macropus rufus
          - Petrogale penicillata
          - Wallabia bicolor

== Paleobiology ==
The fossil remains of Hypsiprymnodon dennisi were found at the Middle Miocene-aged Clefts of Ages 4 site in the Riversleigh World Heritage Area, north-western Queensland. At this point in time, the Riversleigh area had a tropical climate and was covered in rainforest habitat. Hypsiprymnodon dennisi lived alongside other hypsiprymnodontids like Ekaltadeta ima and Ekaltadeta jamiemulvaneyi; the thylacoleonids Wakaleo oldfieldi and Lekaneleo roskellyae; and the vombatid Rhizophascolonus crowcrofti.

Based on its tooth morphology, Hypsiprymnodon dennisi likely had a very similar diet and ecology to the modern musky rat-kangaroo, which is predominantly frugivorous but also opportunistically omnivorous.
