= Hypsiprymnodon philcreaseri =

Hypsiprymnodon philcreaseri Temporal range: Early Miocene, 18.5-16.2 Ma

Scientific classification
- Kingdom: Animalia
- Phylum: Chordata
- Class: Mammalia
- Infraclass: Marsupialia
- Order: Diprotodontia
- Family: Hypsiprymnodontidae
- Genus: Hypsiprymnodon
- Species: †H. philcreaseri

Binomial name
- †Hypsiprymnodon philcreaseri Bates, et al. 2014.

Extinct species of marsupial

Hypsiprymnodon philcreaseri is an extinct species of small marsupial that inhabited northeastern Australia during the Early Miocene, making it one of the oldest species of musky rat-kangaroo known. It was named in 2014 based on several isolated maxilla and dentaries collected from the Riversleigh World Heritage Area. Like its modern relative, H. philcreaseri was predominantly frugivorous.

== Discovery and naming ==
The holotype specimen of Hypsiprymnodon philcreaseri, QM F24148, was collected from the Camel Sputum site, which is classified as a Faunal Zone B deposit at the Riversleigh World Heritage Area, in the Boodjamulla National Park of north-western Queensland. The specimen consists of a left maxilla and associated right and left dentaries. Additional remains collected from several localities at Riversleigh, including the type locality, were also referred to this taxon. It was described in 2014 by Hayley Bates and colleagues alongside other species of musky rat-kangaroo, namely Hypsiprymnodon dennisi and Hypsiprymnodon karenblackae.

The specific epithet was chosen by the authors to honour Phil Creaser, who instigated the World Heritage listing for the Riversleigh fossil deposits and founded the CREATE palaeoscience fund in the University of New South Wales Foundation.

== Description ==
Only a small portion of the jugal process is preserved on the holotype maxilla. It is thin, gracile, and relatively smaller in size compared to those of Hypsiprymnodon moschatus and Hypsiprymnodon bartholomaii. When viewed from below, the occlusal (biting) margin of the upper third premolar is aligned with the cusps nearest to the cheek on the molar row. The third premolar itself is plagiaulacoid, and has eight ridgelets (transcristae) and cusps intersecting along the ridge running lengthwise across the middle of the tooth. The upper molars are low-crowned and bunolophodont, having rounded cusps and prominent ridges running across their occlusal surfaces. It differs from Hypsiprymnodon dennisi and Hypsiprymnodon karenblackae in lacking a lingual cingulum, parastyle, stylar cusps B and D, and protostyle on the first upper molar. The buccal cusps (i.e., the paracone and metacone) of the first molar are tall and acutely pointed, while the lingual cusps (i.e., the protocone and metaconule) are shorter and bulbous. These cusps differ in height on the remaining upper molars, with the protocone being much larger on the second molar, and all cusps being of equal height on the third. The fourth molar is similar to the third but differs in that the metacone is reduced to the point where it has become incorporated into an extension of the postparacrista.

The right dentary of the holotype shows possible puncture wounds from a scavenger or predator just below the molar row. A small foramen is present on the buccal side of the dentary behind the first lower incisor. The first lower incisor is curved from top to bottom and is shaped like a cavalry saber. An alveoli for a possible second lower incisor is present directly behind the first incisor. The eighth cuspid on the lower third premolar is the largest and lacks transcristids. The lower molars decrease in size as they progress towards the back of the skull, and are all slightly angled anterolingually (towards the front of the tongue). A small protostlyid is present on the first lower molar, but is absent in the remaining molars.

== Classification ==
To determine the relationships and affinities of Hypsiprymnodon philcreaseri, Bates and colleagues (2014) performed a phylogenetic analysis using a slightly modified version of the dataset published by Kear and Pledge (2007). In their strict consensus tree, they found that H. philcreaseri formed an unresolved polytomy with several other species of Hypsiprymnodon and propleopines at the base of Macropodoidea. The authors noted that, although Hypsiprymnodon wasn't recovered as monophyletic in their analysis, H. philcreaseri can be referred to the genus based on very close morphological similarity. The phylogenetic tree of Bates and colleagues (2014) is reproduced below:

- Macropodoidea
  - †Ekaltadeta ima
  - Hypsiprymnodon moschatus
  - †Hypsiprymnodon philcreaseri
  - †Hypsiprymnodon dennisi
  - †Hypsiprymnodon karenblackae
  - †Hypsiprymnodon bartholomaii
  - †Jackmahoneya toxoniensis
  - †Propleopus oscillans
  - Balbaridae
    - †Nambaroo gillespieae
    - - †Balbaroo fangaroo
      - - †Ganawamaya acris
        - †Wururoo dayamayi
  - - †Bettongia moyesi
    - Bettongia penicillata
    - †Bulungamaya delicata
    - †Ganguroo bilamina
    - †Ngamaroo archeri
    - †Nowidgee matrix
    - Potorous tridactylus
    - †Purtia mosaicus
    - †Wabularoo naughtoni
    - †Wakiewakie lawsoni
    - †Wanburoo hilarus
    - - Dendrolagus lumholtzi
      - Dorcopsis muelleri
      - †Dorcopsoides fossilis
      - Sthenurinae
        - †Hadronomas puckridgi
        - †Rhizosthenurus flanneryi
        - - †Procoptodon goliah
          - †Simosthenurus occidentalis
      - Macropodinae
        - Thylogale thetis
        - - Macropus rufus
          - Petrogale penicillata
          - Wallabia bicolor

== Paleobiology ==
Specimens of Hypsiprymnodon philcreaseri have been collected from several sites within Faunal Zone B at the Riversleigh World Heritage Area, which have all been radiometrically dated using U-Pb isotopes to the Early Miocene subepoch. Various factors like the high number of arboreal taxa, overall species richness and the presence of certain rainforest taxa like bubble nesting frogs, lyrebirds and certain bats supports the interpretation that these sites were deposited in a lowland rainforest environment. Hypsiprymnodon philcreaseri was sympatric with Hypsiprymnodon karenblackae, and is the most abundant Hypsiprymnodon species known from Riversleigh. Other contemporaneous macropods include the propleopine Ekaltadeta ima; the balbarids Ganawamaya acris and Balbaroo gregoriensis; and the basal macropodids Bulungamaya delicata, Ganguroo bilamina and Gumardee pascuali.

Differences in tooth morphology between Hypsiprymnodon philcreaseri and the modern musky rat-kangaroo are minor, which suggests that they had very similar diets and ecologies. The modern species primarily feeds on fleshy fruit; however, it also supplements its diet with invertebrates and fungus.
