= Carpodaptes =

Carpodaptes Temporal range: Late Paleocene-earliest Eocene (Clarkforkian-Wasatchian) ~56.8–50.3 Ma

Scientific classification
- Kingdom: Animalia
- Phylum: Chordata
- Class: Mammalia
- Order: †Plesiadapiformes
- Family: †Carpolestidae
- Genus: †Carpodaptes; Matthew & Granger, 1921

Extinct genus of primates

Carpodaptes ("fruit eater" from Ancient Greek κᾰρπός (karpós), "fruit, grain" + δᾰ́πτης (dáptēs), "eater, consumer") was a genus that encompassed small, insectivorous animals that roamed the Earth during the Late Paleocene. Specifically, Carpodaptes can be found between the Tiffanian and Clarkforkian periods of North America. Although little evidence, this genus may have made it through to the early Eocene. They are known primarily from collections of jaw and teeth fragments in North America, mainly in southwestern Canada and northwestern America. Carpodaptes are estimated to have weighed approximately 53-96 grams which made them a little bigger than a mouse. However small, Carpodaptes was a placental mammal within the order Plesiadapiformes that appeared to have a high fiber diet. This insect-eating mammal may have been one of the first to evolve fingernails in place of claws. This may have helped them pick insects, nuts, and seeds more easily off the ground than with paws or claws. Carpodaptes was thought to only exist in North America but recent discoveries of dentition fragments have been found in China.

== Dentition ==
The fossil record of Carpodaptes is relatively sparse excluding jaw and teeth fragments. However, much can be concluded off of these few fragments. Their upper jaw had a dental formula of 2:1:3:3 and 2:1:2:3 on their lower jaw. Carpodaptes are characterized by their plagiaulacoid dentition seen on their first lower premolar. Their p4 had 5-7 apical cusps depending on the specimen. This enlarged p4 would have potentially allowed the mammal to have crack open nuts and seeds as well as act as a slicing function on invertebrates. Their p3 is characterized by lingual apical cusps that are flattened and sometimes even concave. In some species of Carpodaptes, their upper M1 indicates a specialized wedging function that acts in accordance with their p4. The varying development of dentition between Carpodaptes species indicates they were adapting their teeth to conform with a high fiber diet. However, their teeth are still rather primitive in comparison to other early-diverging primatomorpha of this era. Carpodaptes are also recognized by the loss of their p2, and some species even show to have a shortening of their mandible to potentially exert a greater biting force. Finally, their upper molars are studded and file-like which would have assisted with breaking open nuts and seeds.

== Taxonomy and phylogeny ==
Carpodaptes is part of an early diverging group of primates that lived approximately 60 million years ago. This genus was first identified in 1921 by Matthew and Granger. They are sister taxa to Carpolestes and Carpocristes. Carpocristes, unlike Carpolestes and Carpodaptes, dominated Asia whereas the other two thrived in North America. Within the genus, 7 species have been identified: Carpodaptes aulacodon, Carpodaptes cygneus, Carpodaptes hazelae, Carpodaptes hobackensis, Carpodaptes jepseni, Carpodaptes rosei, and Carpodaptes stonleyi.

It was originally thought that Carpodaptes was a subset of the genus Carpocristes until recent discoveries found the progression of ridges, serrations, and apical cusps more well defined in Carpodaptes than Carpocristes. This suggests that Carpocristes diverges from an earlier common ancestor with Carpodaptes rather than Carpodaptes being a direct descendant of Carpocristes.

The brief connection of North America with Europe could help explain how Carpodaptes expanded to Asian localities, however it is perplexing that no fossil evidence has been recovered from European regions. This may suggest Carpodaptes survived more efficiently in a warm and dry climate than a warm and moist one.

== Paleoecology ==
Carpodaptes prospered during the late Paleocene and some species made it through the early Eocene. Fragments of Carpodaptes have been notably found in the Swan Hills of Canada, Big Horn Basin, and Clark Forks Basin in Wyoming. This suggests that Carpodaptes lived in a subtropical, humid climate in which there would have been plenty of flora to seek refuge from larger animals. This coincides with the hypothesis that Carpodaptes mainly consumed fruits and nuts as there is a corresponding diversification of plant species in the late Paleocene. At the same time, insects began to recover from the Paleocene–Eocene Thermal Maximum (PETM) which allowed Carpodaptes to expand into broader niches with a broader dietary requirement. The radiation of insect herbivores in the late Paleocene is a possible explanation of a rise in CO_{2} levels at the end of the Paleocene. This would have been in part of Carpodaptes radiation into scansorial insectivores. It could also explain why many species of Carpodaptes did not survive through the Paleocene-Eocene boundary. Dental microwear and the wedge-like morphology of its trigonid and fourth mandibular premolar suggest that C. hazelae was omnivorous.
