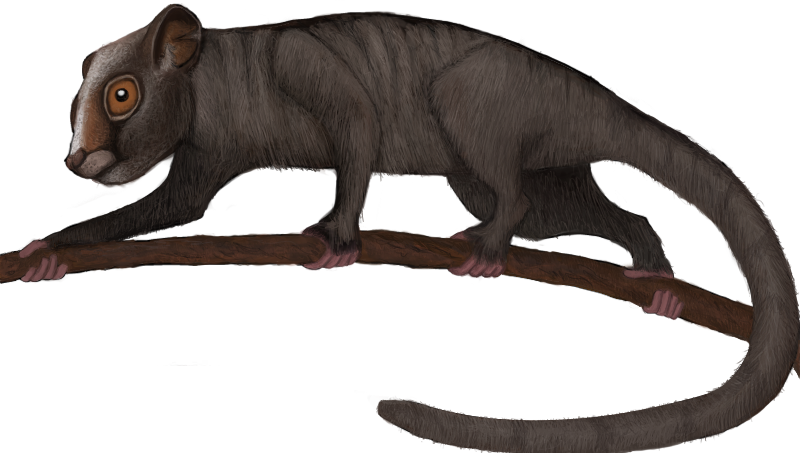

Scientific classification
- Kingdom: Animalia
- Phylum: Chordata
- Class: Mammalia
- Order: Plesiadapiformes
- Family: †Carpolestidae
- Genus: †Carpolestes
- Species: †C. simpsoni

Binomial name
- †Carpolestes simpsoni Bloch and Gingerich, 1998

= Carpolestes simpsoni =

Carpolestes simpsoni Temporal range: late Paleocene, 58.7–56.8 Ma

Extinct species of mammal

Carpolestes simpsoni is an extinct species of Plesiadapiforms, late species of Carpolestes which is one of the earliest primate-like mammals appearing in the fossil record during the late Paleocene. C. simpsoni had grasping digits but no forward-facing eyes.

Weighing about 100 g (3.5 oz), C. simpsoni appeared adapted for an arboreal habitat. One large, nail-tipped toe opposed other toes, allowing a firm grip on branches. Like other species of Carpolestes, the dental morphology of C. simpsoni is specially adapted to eating fruit, seeds, and invertebrates.
