= Black dorcopsis =

Conservation status
- Critically Endangered (IUCN 3.1)

Scientific classification
- Kingdom: Animalia
- Phylum: Chordata
- Class: Mammalia
- Infraclass: Marsupialia
- Order: Diprotodontia
- Family: Macropodidae
- Genus: Dorcopsis
- Species: D. atrata

Binomial name
- Dorcopsis atrata Van Deusen, 1957
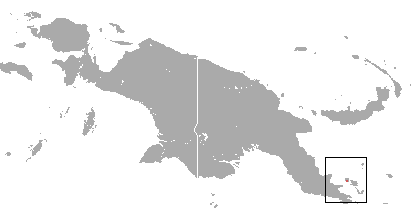
- Black dorcopsis range

Species of marsupial

The black dorcopsis or black forest wallaby (Dorcopsis atrata) is a species of marsupial in the family Macropodidae. It is endemic to Goodenough Island at the eastern end of New Guinea where its natural habitat is subtropical or tropical dry forests. It is threatened by habitat loss and hunting, its population is declining and the IUCN lists it as being "Critically endangered". It was discovered in 1953 during The Fourth Archbold Expedition to New Guinea.

== Description ==
The black dorcopsis has black upper parts and dark brown underparts. It has a long muzzle, a naked snout, small rounded ears and a tail which lacks hair on its hind half. Its fore limbs are robust, but its hind limbs and feet are relatively small. Many of them have white 'sox' on one or both of their front paws, and a white tail tip, which contrast strongly with the black body fur. Adults reach a length of between 29 and 39 inches (74 and 99 cm) with a tail of 11 to 16 inches (28 to 41 cm) and weigh around 2 kilograms (4.4 lb).

== Biology ==
The black dorcopsis is believed to be mainly nocturnal but may move around during the day in dense forest. It feeds on shoots, leaves, grasses, fruit, roots and possibly the occasional insect, which it gathers with its mouth and manipulates with its fore paws. A young black dorcopsis develops in its mother's pouch. There are four nipples in the pouch despite the fact that there is normally only a single juvenile developing there at any one time.

== Status ==
The black dorcopsis is known from a single location, Goodenough Island at the eastern end of Papua New Guinea where it has a total extent of occurrence of less than 100 square kilometres (39 sq mi). It spends most of the year in oak forests at altitudes of between 1,000 and 1,800 metres (3,300 and 5,900 ft) where there is little undergrowth but the ground is carpeted with mosses, lichens and ferns. It descends seasonally to gullies and lower ground at which time it is vulnerable to being hunted. The montane forest is being degraded using slash and burn techniques and is eventually being converted into grassland. Although the black dorcopsis is common in suitable habitat, the overall population is declining and the IUCN lists its conservation status as being "Critically endangered".
