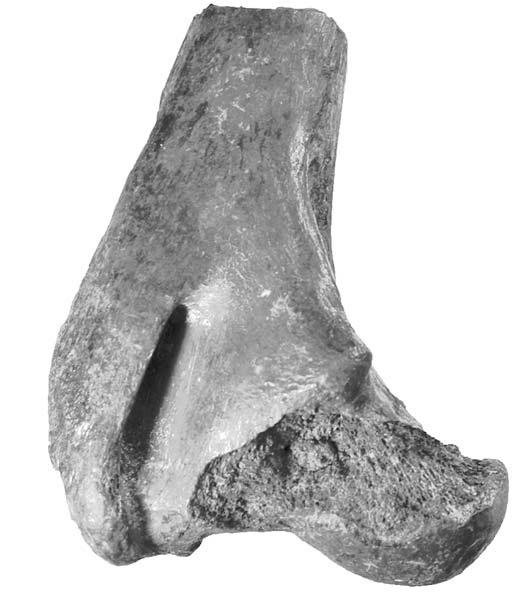

Scientific classification
- Domain: Eukaryota
- Kingdom: Animalia
- Phylum: Chordata
- Class: Mammalia
- Infraclass: Marsupialia
- Order: Diprotodontia
- Family: Hypsiprymnodontidae
- Genus: †Brachalletes de Vis, 1883
- Species: †B. palmeri

Binomial name
- †Brachalletes palmeri de Vis, 1883

= Brachalletes =

Brachalletes Temporal range: Pleistocene

Extinct genus of marsupials

Brachalletes was an early marsupial from the Pliocene deposits of Australia. Its relationship with other marsupial species is under debate. The genus is extinct. The species was assigned to the order Diprotodontia by McKenna and Bell in 1997, though it is placed in its own order by other authorities. The species is described as an omnivore.

The first description of the species Brachalletes palmeri was assigned to a new genus by the author Charles De Vis, suggesting that it was probably distinguishable from the genus Procoptodon. The specimens obtained at the Chinchilla site were presented to the Linnean Society of New South Wales and published in its journal in 1883. The genus name was intended to allude what was estimated to be a "contracted gait" of the new macropod, the specific epithet was an honour to Arthur Hunter Palmer, who had assisted in the collection of the specimens.
