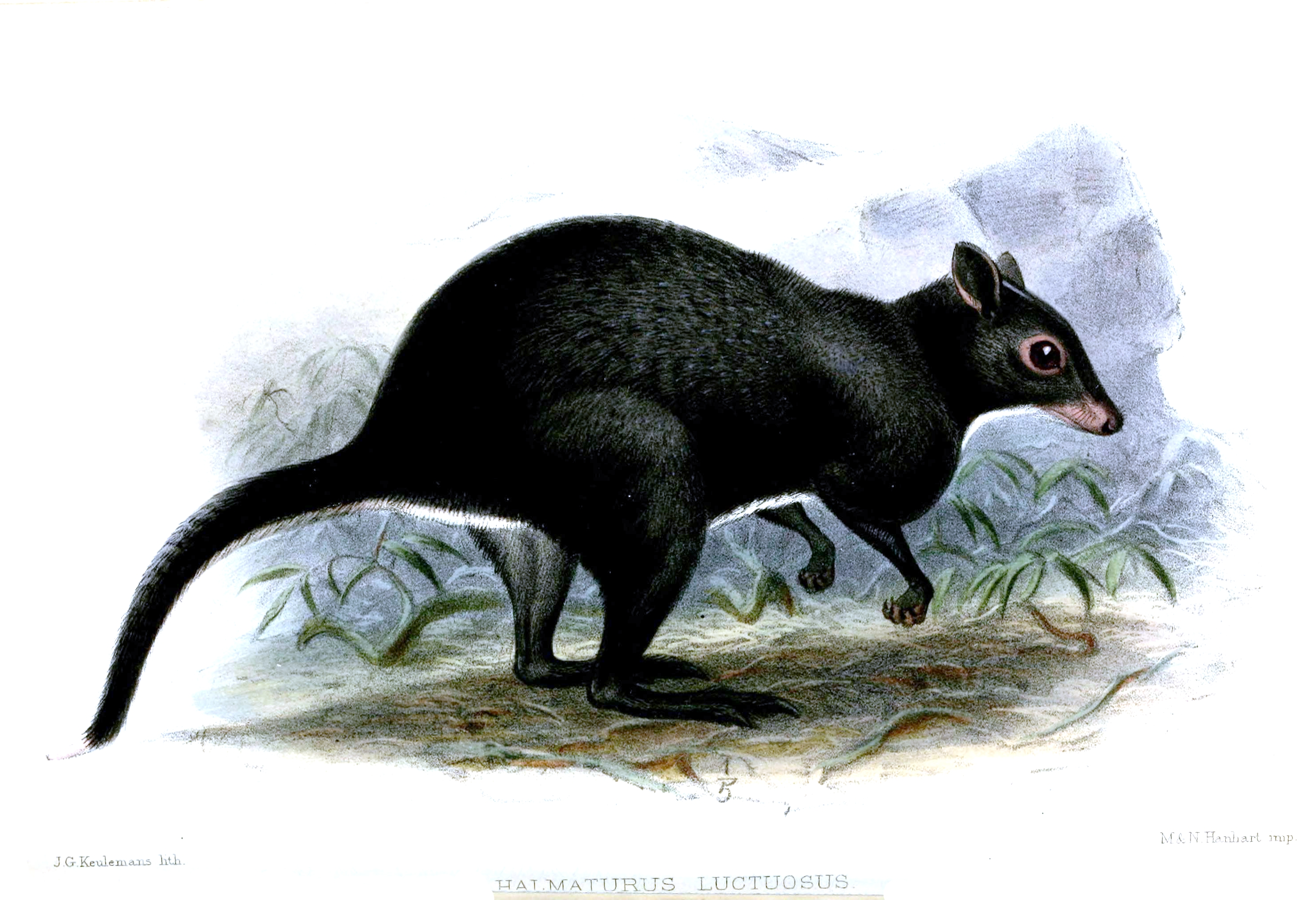

Conservation status
- Vulnerable (IUCN 3.1)

Scientific classification
- Kingdom: Animalia
- Phylum: Chordata
- Class: Mammalia
- Infraclass: Marsupialia
- Order: Diprotodontia
- Family: Macropodidae
- Genus: Dorcopsis
- Species: D. luctuosa

Binomial name
- Dorcopsis luctuosa (D'Albertis, 1874)
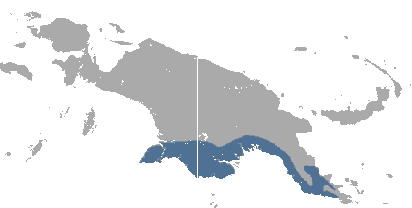
- Gray dorcopsis range

Synonyms
- Halmaturus luctuosus

= Gray dorcopsis =

Species of marsupial

The gray dorcopsis or gray forest wallaby (Dorcopsis luctuosa) is a species of marsupial in the family Macropodidae. It is found in West Papua and Papua New Guinea.

== Description ==
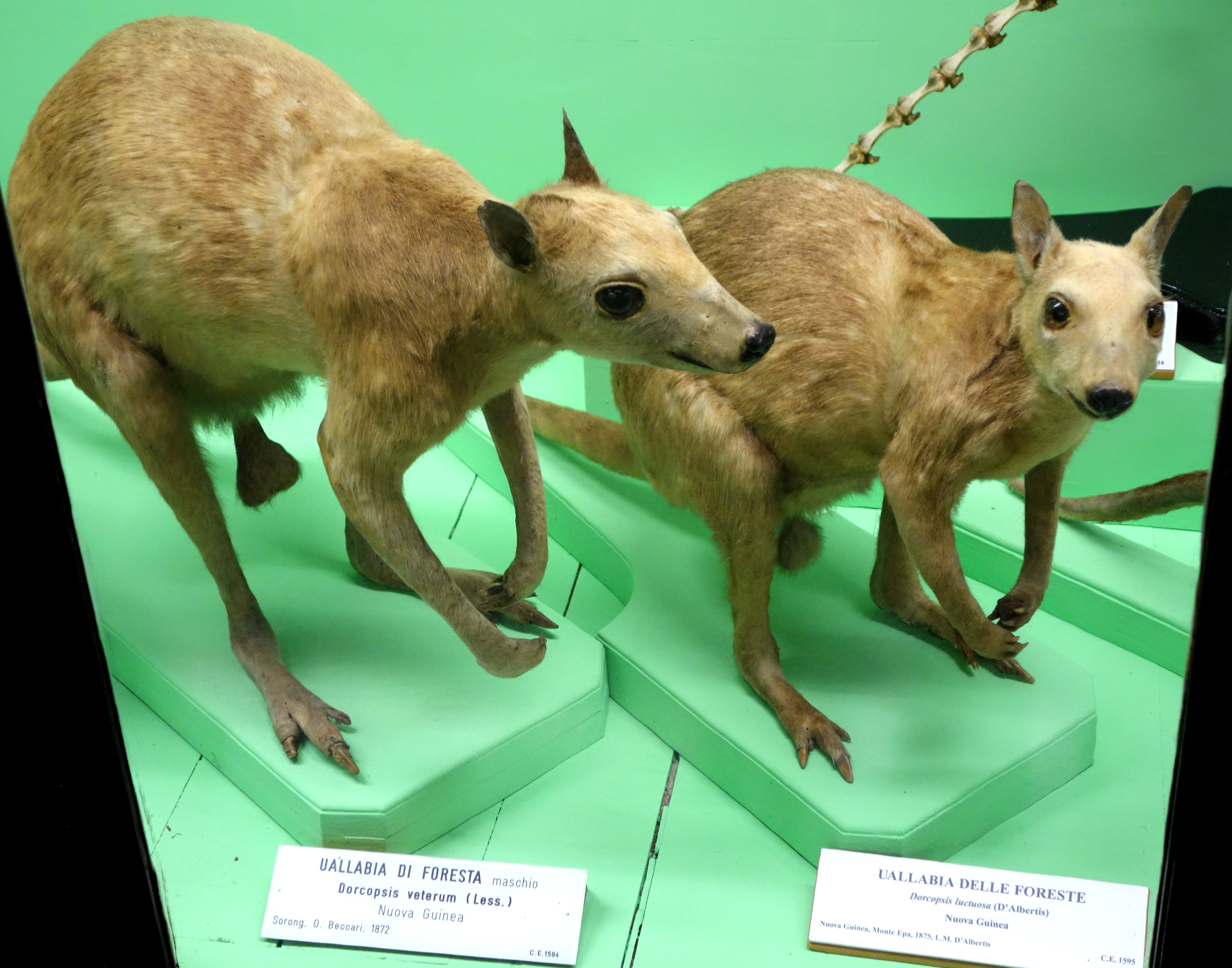

The gray dorcopsis has a long muzzle and small, rounded ears. The forelegs are relatively longer in comparison to the hind legs than they are in most other members of the family Macropodidae. The tail is long and has a bare, cornified tip. The short, dense fur is smoky-grey above and paler grey beneath, with a yellowish patch around the single cloacal orifice. Males are much larger than females, a male weighing up to 11.6 kg (26 lb) while a female reaches 3.6 kg (8 lb). The head and body length is 97 cm (38 in) in males and 39 cm (15 in) in females, with tails reaching 97 cm (38 in) and 31 cm (12 in) respectively.

== Distribution and habitat ==
The gray dorcopsis is endemic to the southern and southeastern part of the island of New Guinea where it occurs at altitudes of up to 400 metres (1,300 ft). Its habitat is tropical primary and secondary forest, in particular gallery forest, and it is also found in disturbed areas such as abandoned gardens.

== Status ==
The major threats experienced by the gray dorcopsis are the loss of its forest habitat through timber extraction and conversion to small-scale agriculture and the fact that it is hunted for bushmeat. In the vicinity of Port Moresby it has been hunted intensively and few animals remain. It used to be found in the nearby Varirata National Park but it is unclear whether it is still present there. Because of the hunting pressure on this animal, the IUCN believes the population is in decline and lists it as being "Vulnerable". It advocates ongoing monitoring and assessment.
