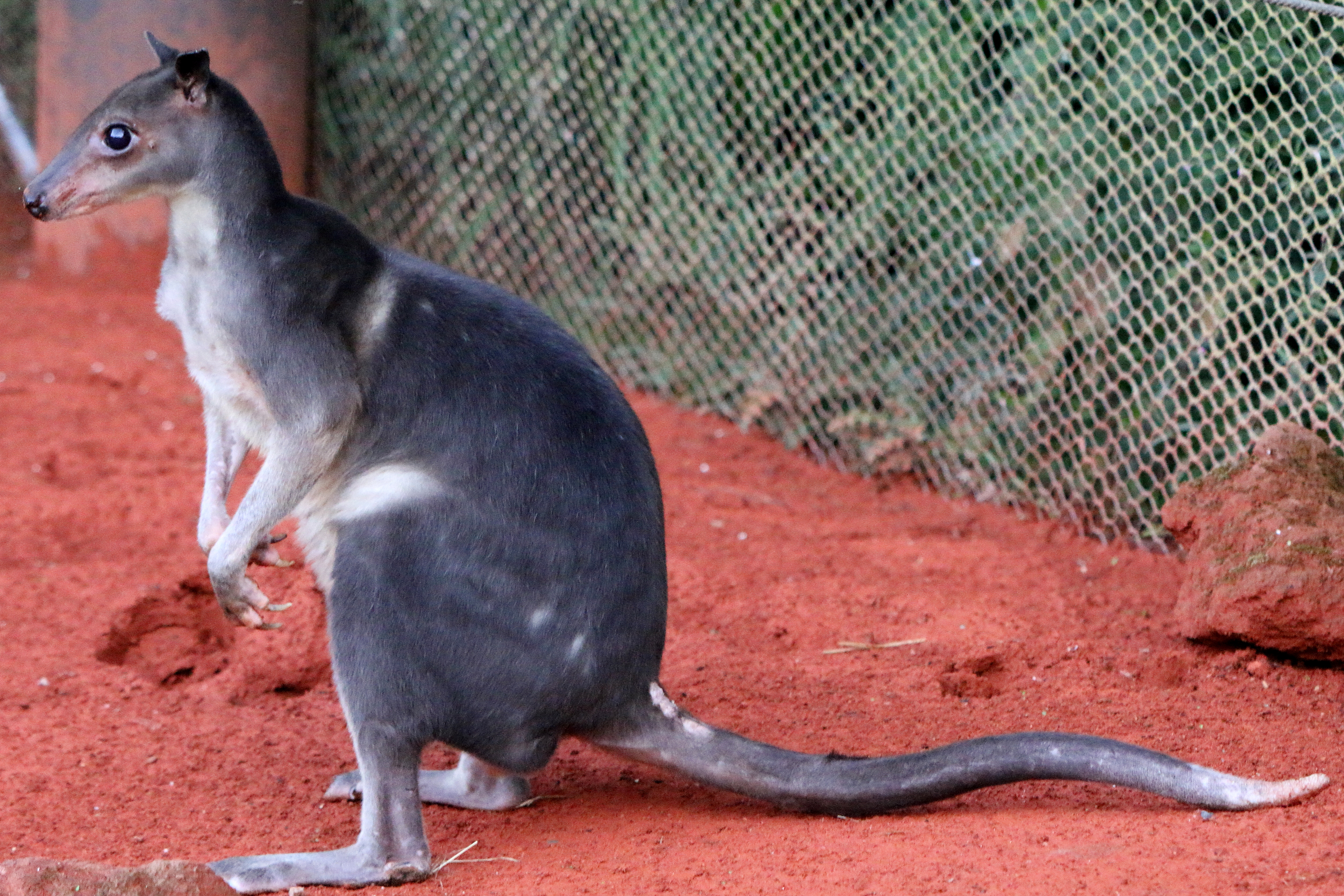
- White-striped dorcopsis in Pairi Daiza

Conservation status
- Least Concern (IUCN 3.1)

Scientific classification
- Kingdom: Animalia
- Phylum: Chordata
- Class: Mammalia
- Infraclass: Marsupialia
- Order: Diprotodontia
- Family: Macropodidae
- Genus: Dorcopsis
- Species: D. hageni

Binomial name
- Dorcopsis hageni Heller, 1897
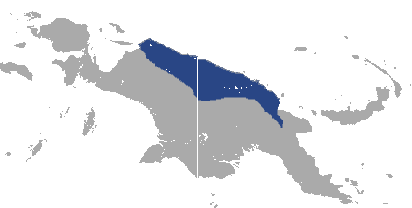
- White-striped dorcopsis range

= White-striped dorcopsis =

Species of marsupial

The white-striped dorcopsis or greater forest wallaby (Dorcopsis hageni) is a species of marsupial in the family Macropodidae found in the northern part of New Guinea. It is a common species in suitable tropical forest habitat and the IUCN lists its conservation status as being of "Least concern".

== Distribution and habitat ==
The white-striped dorcopsis is endemic to New Guinea; its range includes much of the northern parts of Indonesian Papua (predominantly in Papua province and some parts of Highland Papua) and Papua New Guinea, but it is absent from the Huon Peninsula. It is present at altitudes of up to about 400 metres (1,300 ft) above sea level. It lives in both primary and secondary tropical forests and is tolerant of some degree of habitat degradation. In the northern part of its range it is found in alluvial fans at the edge of the Sepik floodplains. In the southern part of its range it is found in mixed alluvial forest but is absent from even the lowest part of hill forests.

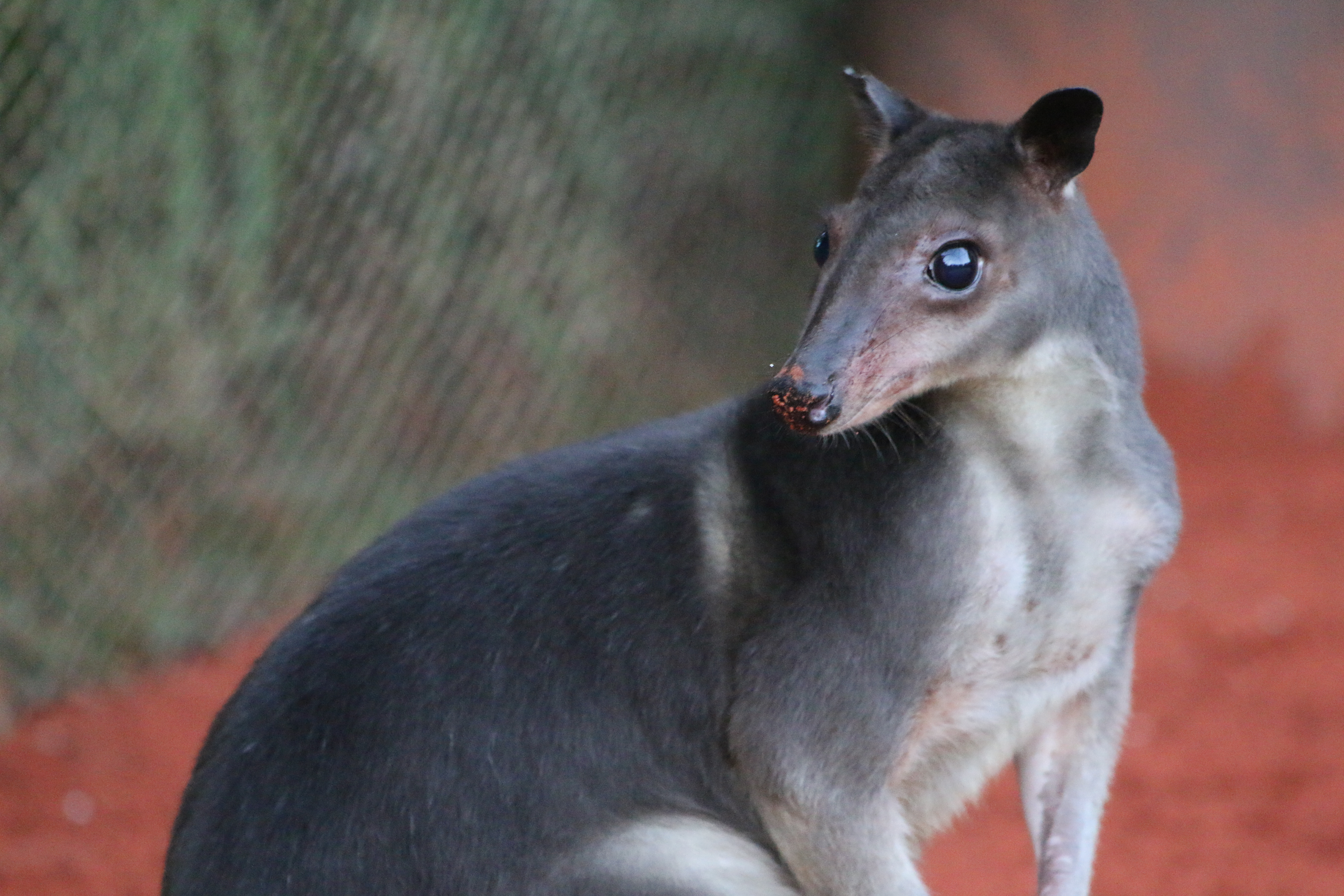
Close up

== Biology ==
The white-striped dorcopsis is a terrestrial herbivore and browser but has also been seen during daylight hours turning over flat stones in search of insects and other organisms. It also feeds on the fruiting bodies of fungi and may play a part in spreading spores and thus maintaining healthy mycorrhizal communities in the forest. Single naked young have been found in the pouches of females during the months of January and April.

== Status ==
The white-striped dorcopsis has a range covering a large area of northern New Guinea and within that range it is common in suitable habitat. It is present in both primary and secondary forest and in some protected areas. Apart from some hunting for human consumption, it does not face any significant threats. The total number of animals is believed to be large and the population trend stable. For these reasons, the International Union for Conservation of Nature has listed it as being of "Least concern" in its Red List of Threatened Species.
