= Mesolaelaps =

Scientific classification
- Kingdom: Animalia
- Phylum: Arthropoda
- Subphylum: Chelicerata
- Class: Arachnida
- Order: Mesostigmata
- Family: Laelapidae
- Genus: Mesolaelaps; Hirst, 1926

Genus of mites

Mesolaelaps is a genus of mites in the family Laelapidae. The small macropod species Hypsiprymnodon moschatus, the musky rat kangaroo, is recorded as a to host species of this mite.

== Species ==
- Mesolaelaps anomalus (Hirst, 1926)
- Mesolaelaps antipodiana (Hirst, 1926)
- Mesolaelaps australiensis (Hirst, 1926)
- Mesolaelaps bandicoota (Womersley, 1956)
- Mesolaelaps lagotisinus (Hirst, 1931)
- Mesolaelaps sminthopsis (Womersley, 1954)
