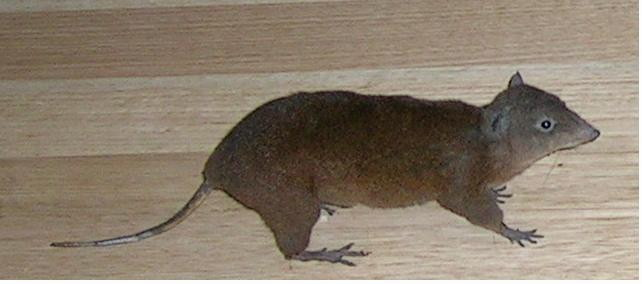
- Hypsiprymnodon moschatus

Scientific classification
- Kingdom: Animalia
- Phylum: Chordata
- Class: Mammalia
- Infraclass: Marsupialia
- Order: Diprotodontia
- Superfamily: Macropodoidea
- Family: Hypsiprymnodontidae; Collett, 1877

Subfamilies and genera
- Hypsiprymnodontinae; Hypsiprymnodon; †Propleopinae; †Jackmahoneyi; †Ekaltadeta; †Propleopus; †Brachalletes

= Hypsiprymnodontidae =

Hypsiprymnodontidae Temporal range: Oligocene–Recent

Family of marsupials

The Hypsiprymnodontidae /ˌhɪpsɪˌprɪmnoʊdɒnˈtaɪdiː/ are a family of macropods, one of two families containing animals commonly referred to as rat-kangaroos. The single known extant genus and species in this family, the musky rat-kangaroo, Hypsiprymnodon moschatus, occurs in northern Australia. During the Pleistocene, this family included the megafauna genus Propleopus.

== Classification ==
- Family Hypsiprymnodontidae
  - Subfamily Hypsiprymnodontinae
    - Genus Hypsiprymnodon
      - Hypsiprymnodon moschatus, musky rat-kangaroo
      - †Hypsiprymnodon bartholomaii
      - †Hypsiprymnodon philcreaseri
      - †Hypsiprymnodon dennisi
      - †Hypsiprymnodon karenblackae
  - Subfamily †Propleopinae Archer and Flannery, 1985
    - Genus †Ekaltadeta
      - †Ekaltadeta ima
      - †Ekaltadeta jamiemulveneyi
    - Genus †Propleopus
      - †Propleopus oscillans
      - †Propleopus chillagoensis
      - †Propleopus wellingtonensis
    - Genus †Jackmahoneyi
      - †Jackmahoneyi toxoniensis
    - Genus †Brachalletes
      - †Brachalletes palmeri
