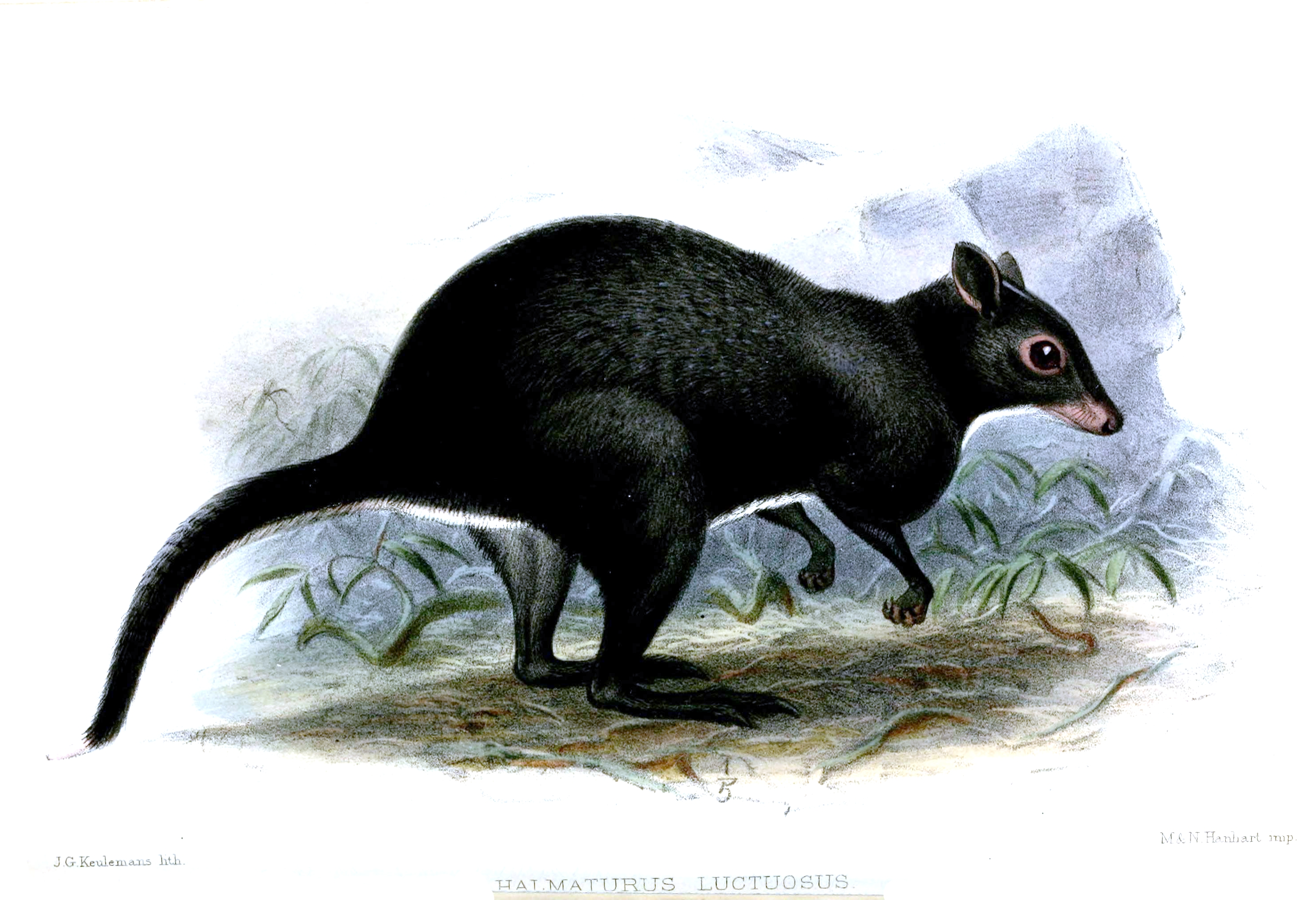
- An illustration of a gray dorcopsis
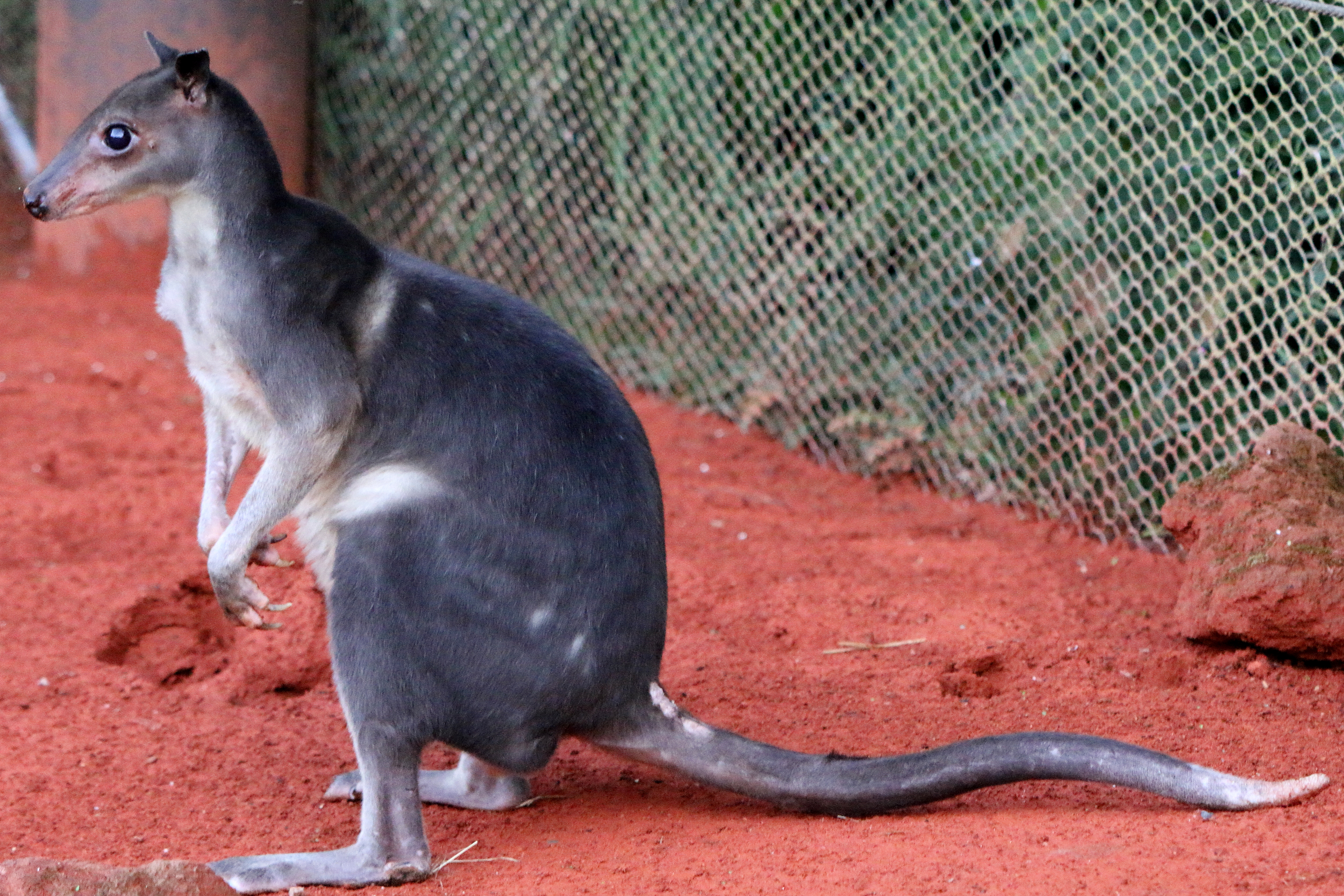
- A white-striped dorcopsis

Scientific classification
- Kingdom: Animalia
- Phylum: Chordata
- Class: Mammalia
- Infraclass: Marsupialia
- Order: Diprotodontia
- Family: Macropodidae
- Subfamily: Macropodinae
- Genus: Dorcopsis; Schlegel & S. Müller, 1845

Type species
- Didelphis brunii Quoy & Gaimard, 1830 (= Macropus muelleri Lesson, 1827)

Species
- See text
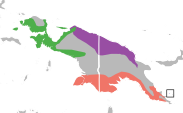
- Distribution rangemap of Dorcopsis species. D. luctuosa in red, D. hageni in purple, D. muelleri in green, D. atrata in blue in box.

= Dorcopsis =

Genus of marsupials

Dorcopsis is a genus of marsupial in the family Macropodidae. The members of the genus are found on the island of New Guinea.

The fossil record of the genus is scant, coming only from Pliocene southeastern Australia in the form of one species (Dorcopsis wintercookorum) and indeterminate fossil teeth attributed to the genus Dorcopsis.

== Species ==
The genus contains the following species:

- Black dorcopsis (Dorcopsis atrata)
- White-striped dorcopsis (Dorcopsis hageni)
- Gray dorcopsis (Dorcopsis luctuosa)
- Brown dorcopsis (Dorcopsis muelleri)
- †Dorcopsis wintercookorum
