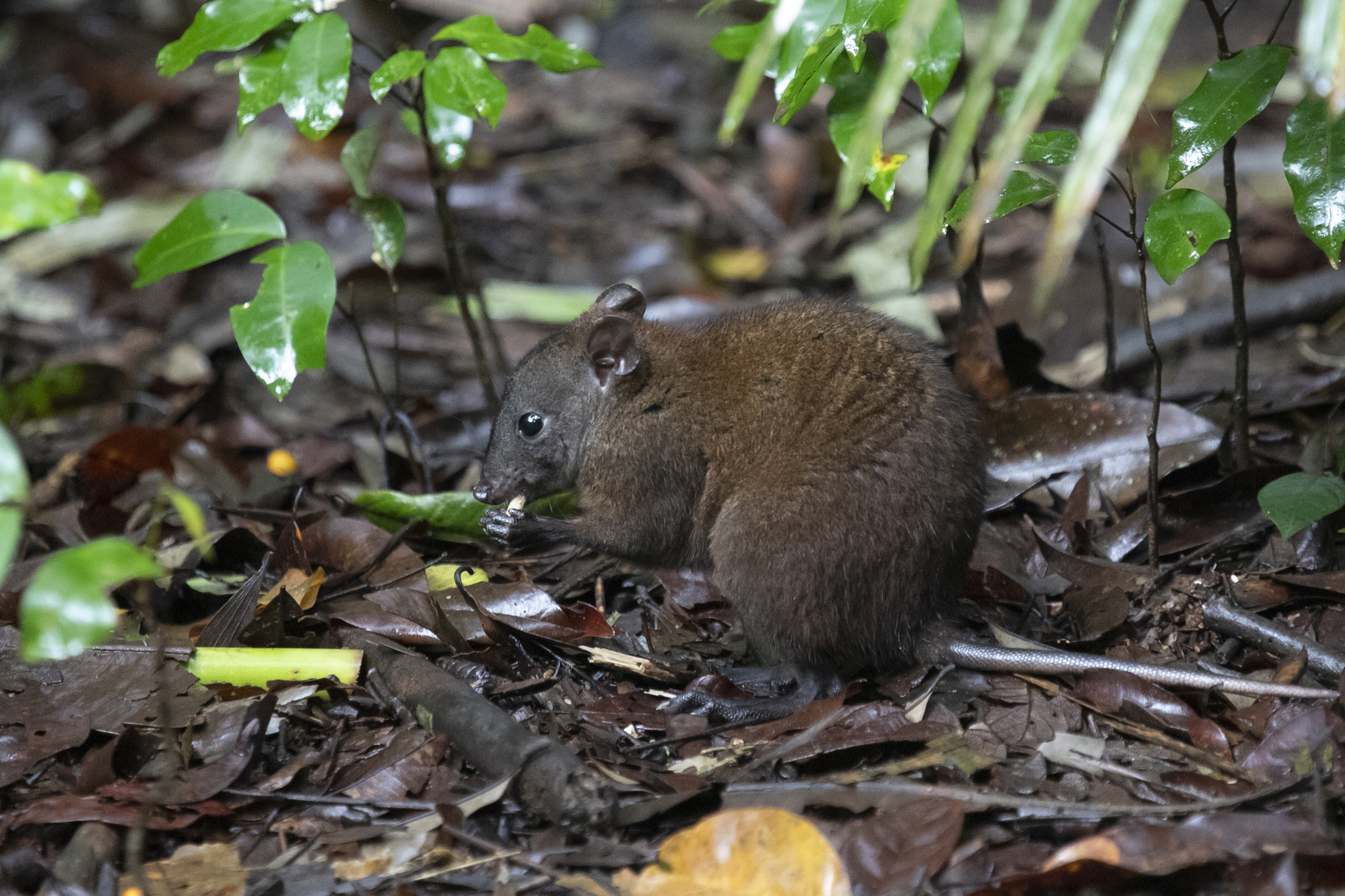
- Hypsiprymnodon moschatus

Scientific classification
- Kingdom: Animalia
- Phylum: Chordata
- Class: Mammalia
- Infraclass: Marsupialia
- Order: Diprotodontia
- Family: Hypsiprymnodontidae
- Genus: Hypsiprymnodon; Ramsay, 1876

Type species
- Hypsiprymnodon moschatus Ramsay, 1876

Species
- †H. bartholomaii; †H. dennisi; †H. karenblackae; H. moschatus; †H. philcreaseri

= Hypsiprymnodon =

Hypsiprymnodon Temporal range: Early Miocene–Present

Genus of marsupials

Hypsiprymnodon is a genus of macropods. The sole extant species is Hypsiprymnodon moschatus, the musky rat-kangaroo. The genus includes four known fossil species.

The generic name combines the Ancient Greek ὕψος (hyps-, 'high'), πρυμνός (prumnós, 'hindmost'), and ὀδών (odṓn, 'tooth'). This name was derived from the genus Hypsiprymnus, a synonym for Potorous, and distinguishes this by combining the Ancient Greek odoús, meaning 'tooth'.
