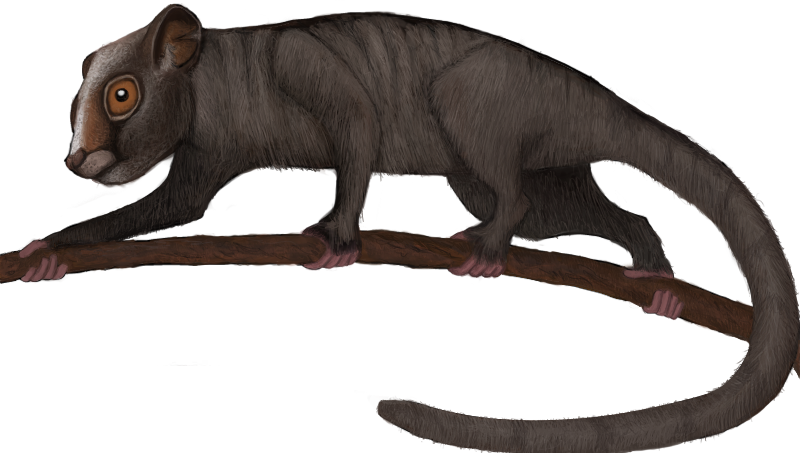
- Carpolestes simpsoni

Scientific classification
- Kingdom: Animalia
- Phylum: Chordata
- Class: Mammalia
- Order: †Plesiadapiformes
- Family: †Carpolestidae
- Genus: †Carpolestes; Simpson, 1928

Type species
- †Carpolestes nigridens

Species
- †C. dubius Jepsen, 1930 †C. nigridens Simpson, 1928 †C. simpsoni Bloch and Gingerich, 1998 †C. twelvemilensis Mattingly, Sanisidro & Beard, 2017

= Carpolestes =

Carpolestes Temporal range: Late Paleocene, 61.7–55.8 Ma

Extinct genus of mammals

Carpolestes (from Ancient Greek καρπός (karpós), meaning "fruit", and λῃστής (lēistḗs), meaning "robber", and thus, "fruit robber") is a genus of extinct primate-like mammals from the late Paleocene of North America. It first existed around 58 million years ago. The three species of Carpolestes appear to form a lineage, with the earliest occurring species, C. dubius, ancestral to the type species, C. nigridens, which, in turn, was ancestral to the most recently occurring species, C. simpsoni.

== Description ==
Carpolestes had flattened fingernails on its feet but with claws on its fingers. It appears to have been a distant relative of the Plesiadapiformes, such as Plesiadapis.

== Palaeobiology ==
=== Palaeoecology ===
Morphologically, Carpolestes supports Robert Sussman's theory of the co-evolution of tropical fruiting angiosperms and early primates where angiosperms provide nectar and fruits in return for dispersing the seed for tropical rainforest plants. The dental microwear of C. dubius and the wedge formed by its mandibular fourth premolar and its trigonid suggests that it was an omnivore with an affinity for frugivory.
