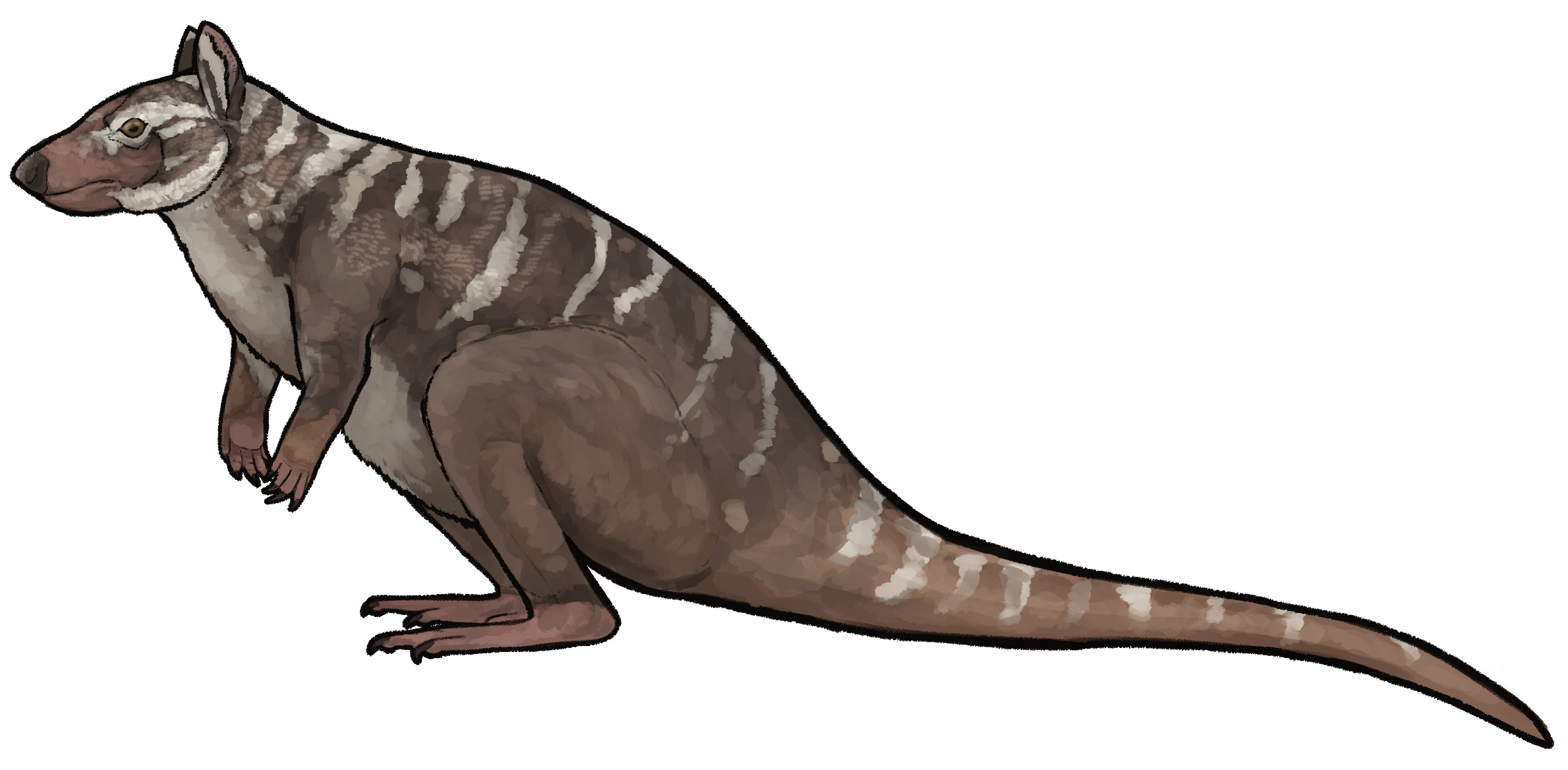
- Restoration of Ekaltadeta ima

Scientific classification
- Kingdom: Animalia
- Phylum: Chordata
- Class: Mammalia
- Infraclass: Marsupialia
- Order: Diprotodontia
- Family: Hypsiprymnodontidae
- Genus: †Ekaltadeta; Mike Archer & Flannery, 1985

Species
- †Ekaltadeta ima Archer & Flannery, 1985 (type species); †Ekaltadeta jamiemulvaneyi Wroe, 1996

= Ekaltadeta =

Ekaltadeta Temporal range: Late Oligocene–Miocene

Extinct genus of marsupials

Ekaltadeta is an extinct genus of marsupials related to the modern musky rat-kangaroos. Ekaltadeta was present in what is today the Riversleigh formations in Northern Queensland from the Late Oligocene to the Miocene, and the genus includes two species. The genus is hypothesized to have been either exclusively carnivorous, or omnivorous with a fondness for meat, based on the chewing teeth found in fossils. This conclusion is based mainly on the size and shape of a large buzz-saw-shaped cheek-tooth, the adult third premolar, which is common to all Ekaltadeta.

Fossils of the animals include two near complete skulls, and numerous upper and lower jaws.

== Taxonomy ==
The description of a new species and genus was published by Mike Archer and Tim Flannery in 1985. The type species is Ekaltadeta ima. It was originally put within the family of Potoroidae, but like the musky rat-kangaroo, the genus was moved to the family Hypsiprymnodontidae. The diagnosis of the genus was revised in a 1996 study by Stephen Wroe of propleopine taxa, after new fossil specimens allowed for comparison with the type material and showcased new characteristics. A largely complete skull of E. ima was described by Wroe in 1998, prompting another reinvestigation of the propleonine clade which the author had suggested contained paraphyletic and polyphyletic species.

The name Ekaltadeta is derived from two words in an indigenous language associated with the McDonnell Ranges, combining the words for powerful, ekalta, and eta to describe the "powerful tooth". The specific epithet ima means "condemned to die" in the language of the same people. The specific epithet jamiemulvaneyi refers to an honour given to J. Mulvaney as a supporter of the Riversleigh Society.

== Distribution ==
A member of the exclusively Australian clade Hypsiprymnodontidae, both species of Ekaltadeta are known exclusively from the Riversleigh World Heritage Area in Queensland. The specimens used in the description of E. jamiemulvaneyi were obtained at two sites in this area, the "Encore" and "Cleft of Ages" sites. Both of these sites are dated to the end of the Middle or the beginning of the late Miocene.

== See also ==
- Riversleigh fauna
