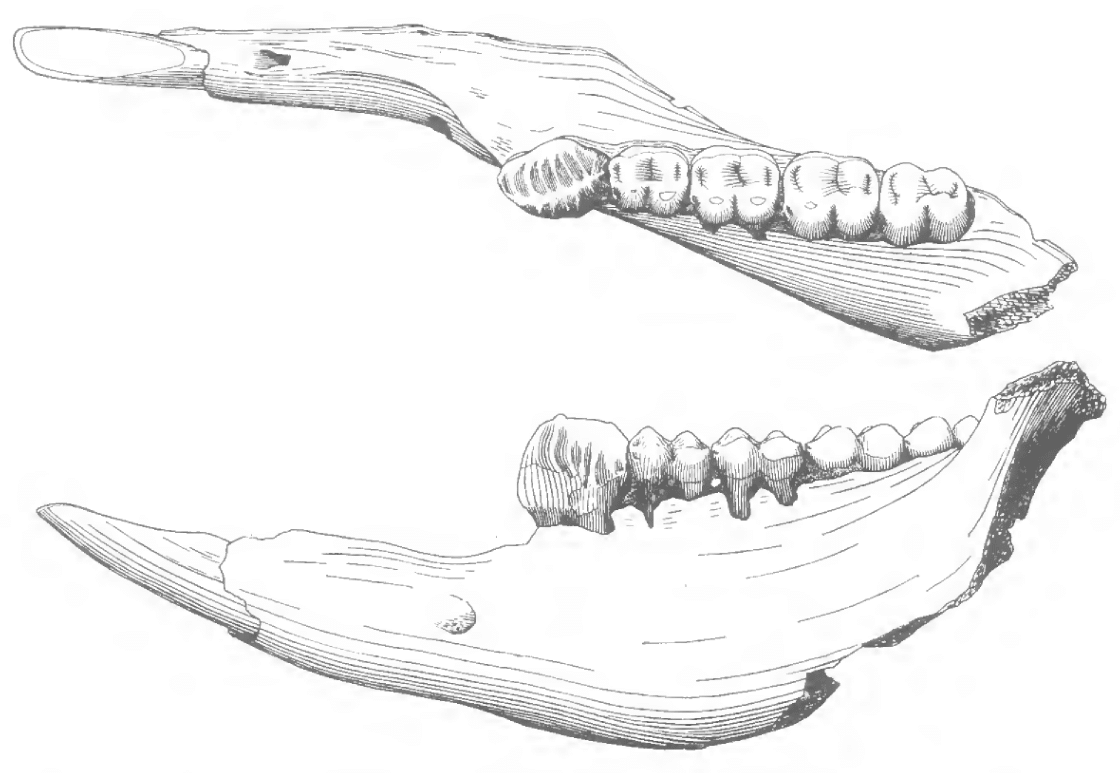
- Diagram of the holotype of P. oscillans

Scientific classification
- Kingdom: Animalia
- Phylum: Chordata
- Class: Mammalia
- Infraclass: Marsupialia
- Order: Diprotodontia
- Family: Hypsiprymnodontidae
- Genus: †Propleopus; Longman, 1924

Type species
- Triclis oscillans De Vis, 1888

Species
- P. oscillans (De Vis, 1888); P. chillagoensis Archer, Bartholomai & Marshall, 1978; P. wellingtonensis Archer & Flannery, 1985

= Propleopus =

Propleopus Temporal range: 4.3–0.055 Ma Pliocene - Pleistocene

Extinct genus of marsupials

Propleopus is an extinct genus of marsupials. The genus contains three species: P. chillagoensis from the Plio-Pleistocene, and P. oscillans and P. wellingtonensis from the Pleistocene.

== Discovery and naming ==
The type species Propleopus oscillans was first named under the genus Triclis by Charles Walter De Vis in 1888. Because the German entomologist Hermann Loew had already named the genus Triclis for a robber fly in 1851, Albert Heber Longman named a replacement name Propleopus in 1924, combining the prefix pró (πρό, 'before') with pleopus, the latter in reference to the junior synonym of Hypsiprymnodon moschatus: Pleopus nudicaudatus named by Richard Owen in 1877. In 1978 and 1985, Archer and colleagues named two more species, P. chillagoensis and P. wellingtonensis, and provided a taxonomic revision of the genus.

== Description ==
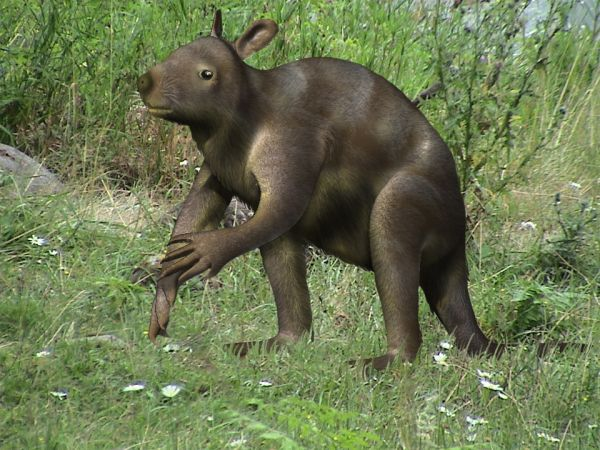
Speculative life restoration

In contrast to most other kangaroos, and similar to their small extant relative, the musky rat-kangaroo, they were probably omnivorous and quadrupedal. Propleopus is estimated to have weighed around 35.5–47.1 kilograms (78–104 lb).
