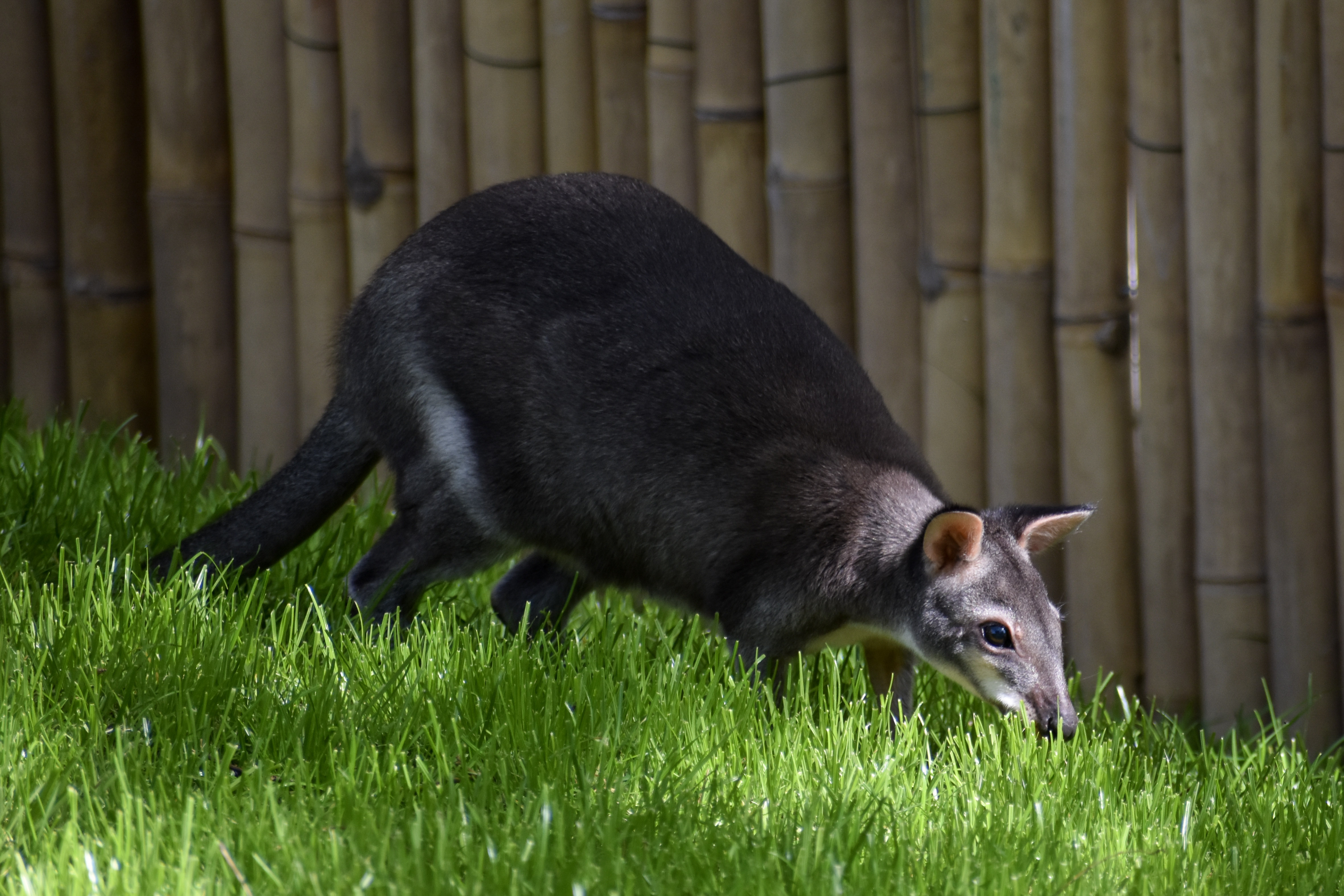

Conservation status
- Least Concern (IUCN 3.1)

Scientific classification
- Kingdom: Animalia
- Phylum: Chordata
- Class: Mammalia
- Infraclass: Marsupialia
- Order: Diprotodontia
- Family: Macropodidae
- Genus: Dorcopsis
- Species: D. muelleri

Binomial name
- Dorcopsis muelleri (Schlegel, 1866)
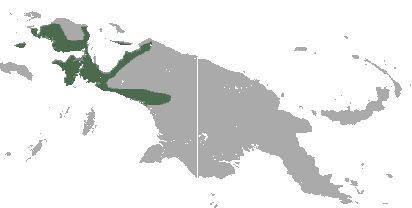
- Brown dorcopsis range

Synonyms
- Kangurus veterum Lesson, 1827; Kangurus brunii Quoy & Gaimard, 1830; Macropus mülleri Schlegel, 1866

= Brown dorcopsis =

Species of marsupial

The brown dorcopsis (Dorcopsis muelleri), also known as the brown forest wallaby, is a species of marsupial in the family Macropodidae. It is endemic to the lowlands of West New Guinea (Southwest Papua, West Papua, Central Papua, Papua) and the nearby Indonesian islands (Salawati, Misool, Yapen).

== Taxonomy ==
The species was originally described under the name Kangurus veterum by René Lesson. The lack of a physical holotype has led to confusion as to whether that name applies to this species or to the sympatric grizzled tree kangaroo. Jean Quoy and Joseph Gaimard would give the species a new name soon after: Kangurus brunii, which was a preoccupied name and therefore could not be used. The next name given to this species would be Hermann Schlegel's "Macropus muelleri" over 25 years later.

This species has consistently been called Dorcopsis muelleri since 1866; however, many authors and taxonomic databases continue to recognize Lesson as the author, even though the specific epithet muelleri does not appear in his 1827 work. The American Society of Mammalogists recognizes Schlegel as the correct author, but Wilson & Reeder's 2005 work Mammal Species of the World and the ITIS both recognize Lesson. Depending on the validity of Lesson's description, this species's taxonomic name may be changed in the future.

This species is named after Salomon Müller, a prominent Dutch naturalist and taxidermist who worked with Schlegel, and after whom Schlegel named several species.

== Description ==
Five subspecies of Dorcopsis muelleri are recognised. The dorsal colour is dull brown, chocolate brown, reddish brown or fawn and the underparts are whitish, creamy-yellow or greyish. The arms are sometimes paler than the dorsal surface and the tip of the tail is devoid of hair.

== Distribution and habitat ==
The brown dorcopsis is endemic to the western end of New Guinea and the islands to the west of this, Misool and Salawati and possibly also Batanta and Waigeo. Its typical habitat is swampy tropical lowland forest including areas that flood in the rainy season, and it is believed to be tolerant of secondary forest, including abandoned gardens.

== Archaeology ==
Many bones have been found in the deposits on the floor of two caves used by hunters, the result of 26,000 years of human occupation of this area of western New Guinea. 80% of the animal bones belonged to the brown dorcopsis, known locally as "djief", and the occupants of these caves are consequently known as "djief hunters".

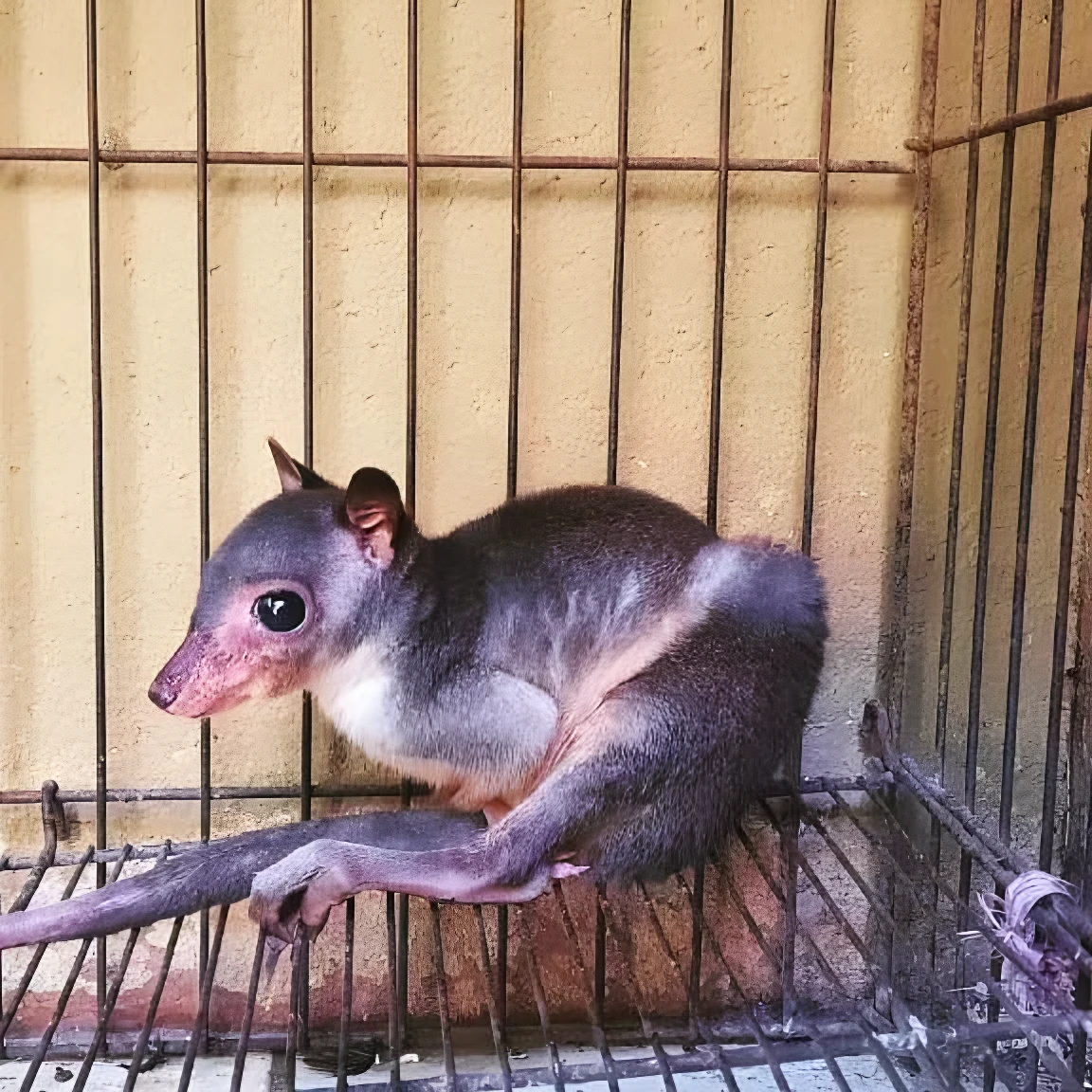
A rescued juvenile

== Status ==
The brown dorcopsis has a broad distribution. It is common in the south coastal part of its range but less common in the centre of the Vogelkop Peninsula and overall its population seems to be stable. Much of its range is uninhabited by humans, but it is also present in areas close to human habitation. Its habitat can be affected by logging, especially on Yapen Island, and the clearing of forested land for small-scale agriculture. Although it is hunted for food, it faces no major threats, and therefore the IUCN lists it as being of "Least concern".
