= Balbaroo fangaroo =

Balbaroo fangaroo Temporal range: Late Oligocene–Early Miocene

Scientific classification
- Domain: Eukaryota
- Kingdom: Animalia
- Phylum: Chordata
- Class: Mammalia
- Infraclass: Marsupialia
- Order: Diprotodontia
- Family: †Balbaridae
- Genus: †Balbaroo
- Species: †B. fangaroo

Binomial name
- †Balbaroo fangaroo Cooke, 2000

Extinct species of marsupial

Balbaroo fangaroo is an extinct species of kangaroo. It was discovered at the Riversleigh World Heritage Area in Northern Australia and described as a new species in 2000.

The species was described from fossilized remains of part of the skull. The skull is approximately the size of that of a modern wallaby. The curved upper canine teeth are more than twice as long as the adjacent incisors and form "fangs" which may have been visible on the living animal even when its mouth was closed. This feature is reflected in the fossil's nickname, "fangaroo", which later became part of its official scientific name.
