= Meniscolophus =

Meniscolophus Temporal range: Late Pliocene

Scientific classification
- Kingdom: Animalia
- Phylum: Chordata
- Class: Mammalia
- Infraclass: Marsupialia
- Order: Diprotodontia
- Family: †Diprotodontidae
- Genus: †Meniscolophus; Stirton, 1955
- Species: †M. mawsoni

Binomial name
- †Meniscolophus mawsoni Stirton, 1955

Extinct genus of marsupials

Meniscolophus is an extinct genus of marsupial of the family Diprotodontidae. Only one species has been described, Meniscolophus mawsoni, from the Late Pliocene of the Tirari Desert, South Australia.

== History and naming ==
The first remains of Meniscolophus were collected by a joint expedition between the South Australian Museum, Department of Geology of the University of Adelaide, and the University of California Museum of Paleontology in 1953. They were found in the Pliocene-aged Tirari Formation of Lake Palankarinna, South Australia. The fossils were subsequently described by Ruben A. Stirton in 1955, alongside other fossils collected during the expedition. The holotype is a mandible and left maxillary fragment belonging to the same individual. Isolated teeth from the same locality have also been referred to this taxon.

The genus name means "crescent crest" in Ancient Greek. The species name was chosen to honour Sir. Douglas Mawson, a former professor at the University of Adelaide.

== Description ==
The upper molar teeth of Meniscolophus have narrow V-shaped valleys that separate the protoloph from the metaloph. Both the second and third molars have expansions on the protoloph, with no expansions or ridges on the metaloph. Stylar cusps are entirely absent on the first lower and second upper molars. The labial surface on the first lower incisor is flat, while the anterior surface is convex. The lower third premolar lacks a hypoconid or talonid. A cingulum (shelf) runs from the labial (outwards, towards the cheek) side of the tooth's central cuspid down to its posterolingual base. The lower molars have crests that join cusps together (known as lophids) running across them. Descending from the anterolingual corner of the hypoconid is a metalophid, which blocks a valley near the midline of each tooth. In contrast to Zygomaturus, the labial cingulum is more extensive.

== Classification ==
In 1967, American palaeontologist Ruben A. Stirton divided Diprotodontidae into four subfamilies; Diprotodontinae, Nototheriinae (to which Meniscolophus was referred to), Zygomaturinae, and Palorchestinae. This taxonomic grouping, however, wouldn't last long as Archer (1977) synonymised Nototheriinae with Diprotodontinae. Archer & Bartholomai (1978) later recognised Meniscolophus as a diprotodontine. In their 1984 book, Archer suggested that Meniscolophus and Euryzygoma might be congeneric. The cladogram below shows its placement within Diprotodontinae and as sister taxon to Euowenia, from Black & Mackness (1999).

- Diprotodontoidea
  - Palorchestidae
  - Diprotodontidae
    - Diprotodontinae
      - - Ngapakaldia
        - Pitikantia
      - - Bematherium
        - - Pyramios
          - - - Meniscolophus
              - Euowenia
            - - Euryzygoma
              - Diprotodon
    - Zygomaturinae
      - Silvabestius
      - - Alkwertatherium
        - - Nimbadon
          - - - Plaisiodon
              - Kolopsoides
            - - Neohelos
              - - Kolopsis
                - - - Maokopia
                    - Hulitherium
                  - Zygomaturus

== Paleobiology ==
The Tirari Formation is Late Pliocene in age, with a date range of 3.9-3.4 Ma. It can be split into three main divisions: the basal Mampuwordu Member, the medial Main Body, and the overlying Pompapillina Member. Meniscolophus is known from the Palankarinna Fauna of the Mampuwordu Member. At the time, the area would have been a seasonally arid environment that may have housed fan-deltas, lakes and floodplains. Meniscolophus would have coexisted in this area alongside the diprotodontid Ambulator keanei, peramelemorphian Ischnodon australis and macropodine Prionotemnus palankarinnicus.
