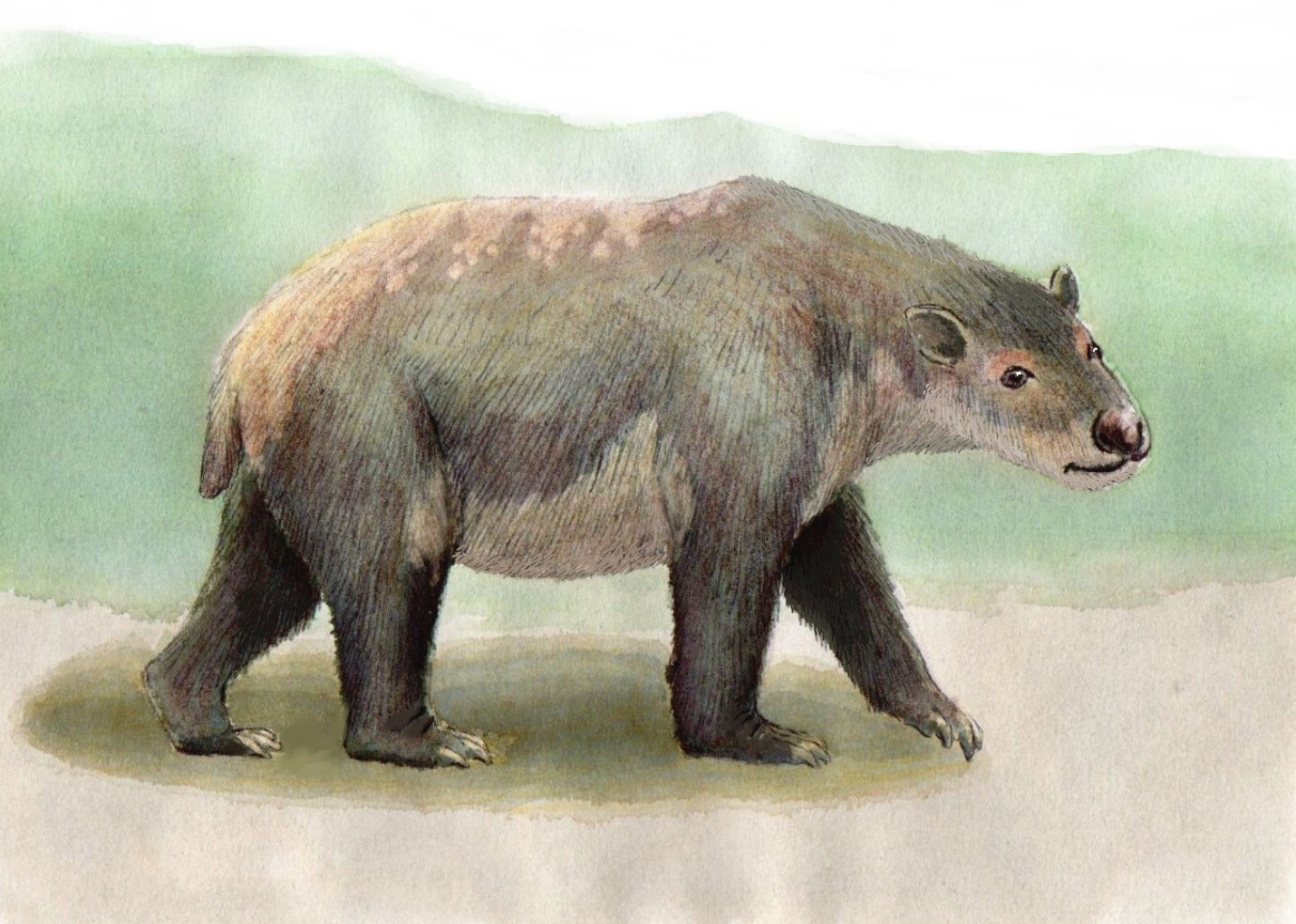
- Speculative life restoration

Scientific classification
- Kingdom: Animalia
- Phylum: Chordata
- Class: Mammalia
- Infraclass: Marsupialia
- Order: Diprotodontia
- Family: †Diprotodontidae
- Subfamily: †Zygomaturinae
- Genus: †Silvabestius; Black & Archer, 1997

Type species
- Silvabestius johnnilandi Black & Archer, 1997

Other species
- †S. michaelbirti Black & Archer, 1997

= Silvabestius =

Silvabestius Temporal range: Late Oligocene

Extinct genus of marsupials

Silvabestius is an extinct genus of diprotodontid marsupial which inhabited Australia during the Late Oligocene. Its fossils have been found from various sites at the Riversleigh World Heritage Area (north-western Queensland). Two species are currently known, S. johnnilandi and S. michaelbirti. A pair of well preserved Silvabestius skulls were found close together, believed to be from a mother and cub.

== Discovery and naming ==
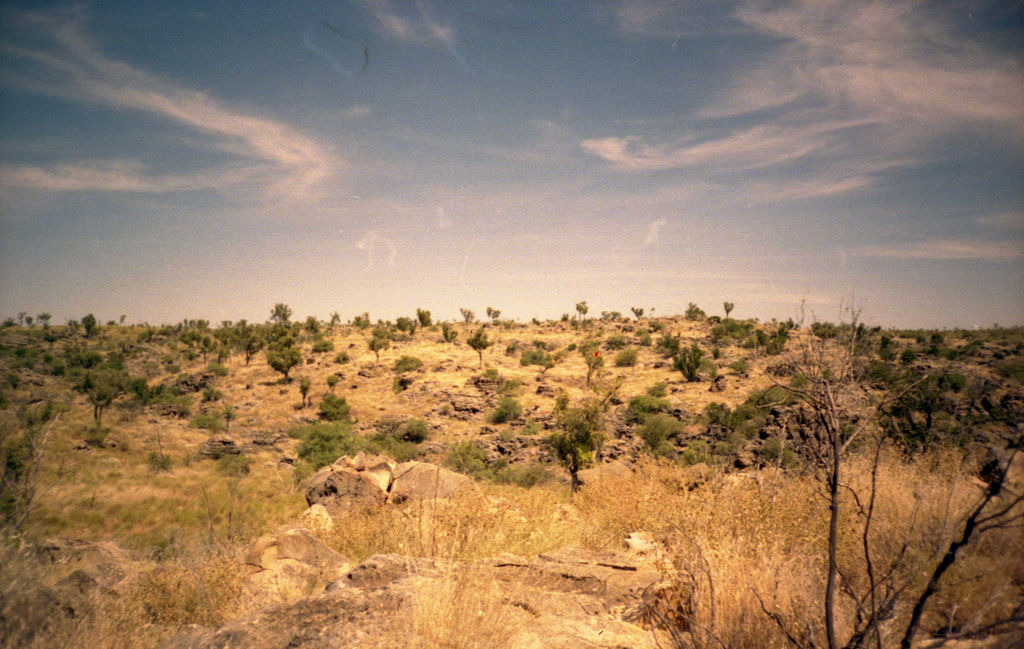
Silvabestius is known from several sites at the Riversleigh World Heritage Area.

The fossils of Silvabestius were discovered in various locations across the Riversleigh World Heritage Area, in the Boodjamulla National Park of north-western Queensland. The fossils were described in 1997 by Karen H. Black and Michael Archer as a distinct genus of zygomaturine diprotodontid. The type species is S. johnnilandi, described on the basis of a skull and lower jaw bone of a juvenile individual (QM F30504) as well as a complete adult skull (QM F30505) from the Late Oligocene VIP Site. Both specimens were found in close proximity to one another and are thought to represent a mother and cub. The second species, S. michaelbirti, was named in the same publication based on a relatively complete skull from the similarly aged Hiatus Site.

In 1967, Richard H. Tedford identified a maxillary fragment from Site D at Riversleigh as belonging to an indeterminate palorchestine. However, it was later referred to Silvabestius sp. by Black & Archer (1997).

The generic name is a combination of the Latin words for "forest" (silva) and "beast" (bestia). This name was chosen to reference its inferred habitat.

== Species ==
- Silvabestius johnnilandi

The type species of the genus, S. johnnilandi lived during the Late Oligocene and was described in 1997. Its remains, which consist of two virtually complete skulls, were found in 1989 from a site at the Riversleigh WHA. The species name was chosen to honour Professor John Niland, for their strong support of the Riversleigh Project and helping to collect fossils at Riversleigh.

- Silvabestius michaelbirti

S. michaelbirti is the smallest of the two species. It is known from a single skull that was discovered in 1992. Its premolar morphology is intermediate between those of diprotodontines and other zygomaturines like S. johnnilandi. It was named after the former Vice Chancellor of the University of New South Wales Professor Michael Birt, who assisted in the collection and preparation of specimens at Riversleigh.

== Description ==
The first upper incisor of Silvabestius is large and curved, while the second, and especially third, are small. Both species retain upper canines, a feature not seen in any other diprotodontid except for Neohelos. However, the canines of S. johnnilandi are limited to alveoli. The upper premolar of S. johnnilandi has four main cusps: the parametacone, protocone, parastyle, and hypocone. In contrast, S. michaelbirti only has three as it lacks the hypocone. Viewed from the top of the tooth (occlusal view), the parametacone has a pyramid-like appearance. This cusp is positioned more towards the centre of the premolar in S. michaelbirti, whereas in S. johnnilandi it is more posterior. The protocone is lingually (towards the tongue) opposite to the parametacone and varies in size depending upon species. Both species possess a small parastyle, a feature that sets it apart from all other zygomaturines. In addition, they also lack a deep trench that separates the parastyle from the base of the parametacone. The upper molars are low-crowned and bilophodont (two-ridged). S. michaelbirti has steeper sloping surfaces on the protolophs and metalophs (crests on the crowns) compared to the type species.

The lower incisors are procumbent and lanceolate in shape. The lower premolar is longer than it is wide and tapers towards the front of the tooth. It possesses a protoconid with a short, bow-like blade. This blade extends from behind the apex of the protoconid and ends in a small cuspid on the posterior cingulid. In front of the protoconid, a poorly developed crest ends in a slight swelling at the front tooth margin. The protolophid and hypolophid crests on the lower molars differ in relative size, with the two being subequal on the second molar and the hypolophid smaller on the third and fourth molars.

Silvabestius was a small diprotodontid, with S. michaelbirti and S. johnnilandi having an estimated body weight of ~34 kg (75 lbs) and ~65 kg (143 lbs) respectively.

== Classification ==
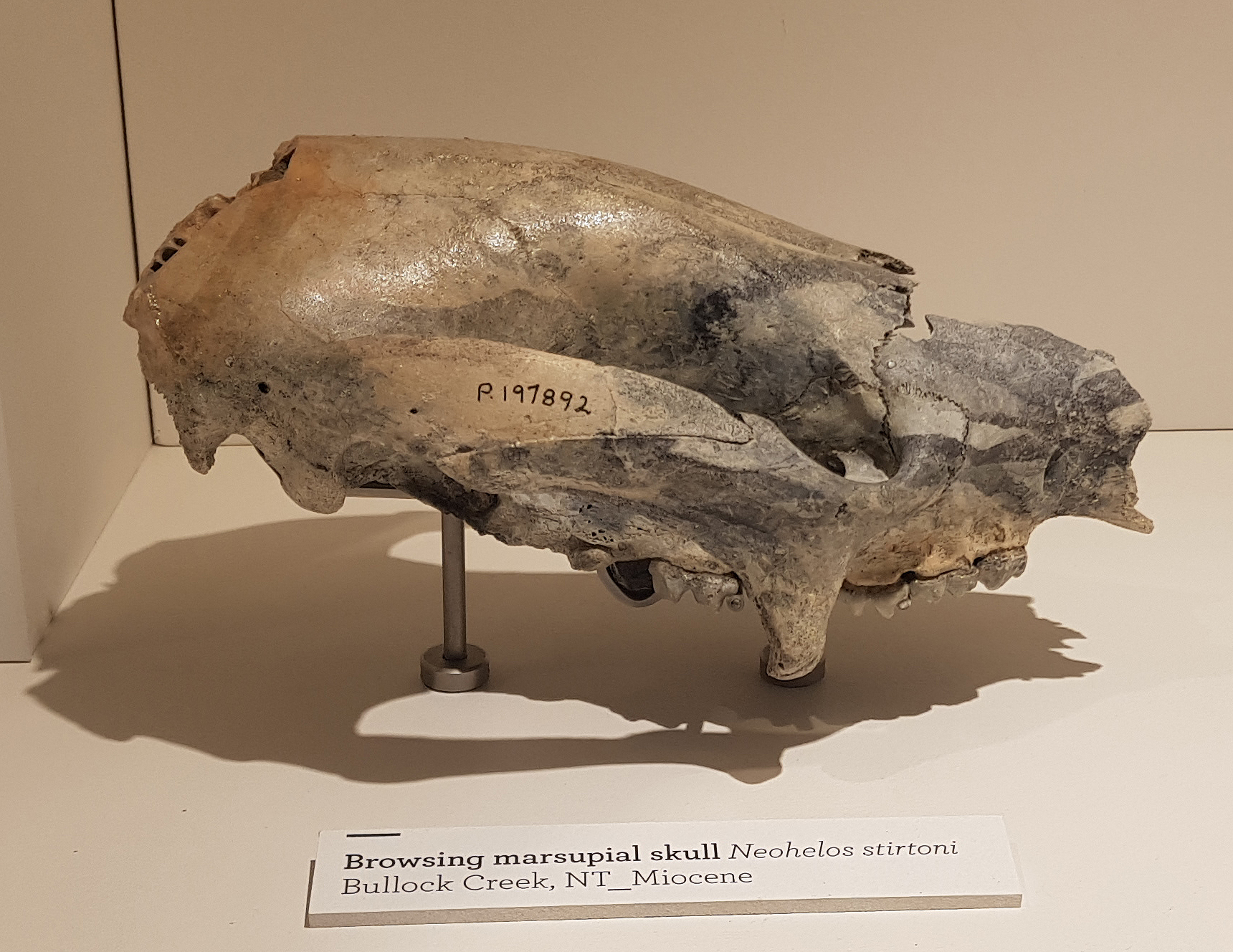
Skull of Neohelos stirtoni, a fellow member of Zygomaturinae

In their 1997 description of Silvabestius, Karen Black and Michael Archer referred this taxon to subfamily Zygomaturinae based on the following synapomorphies: a parastyle on the third upper premolar, and a ventral alisphenoid tympanic process. In addition, they regarded it as the most plesiomorphic zygomaturine known with the possible exception of Raemeotherium. The authors noted that the tricuspid upper premolars of S. michaelbirti are intermediate between the bicuspid premolars of diprotodontines, and the quadricuspid premolars of S. johnnilandi and other zygomaturines. This seems to support the idea that zygomaturines evolved from a diprotodontine-like ancestor, which was first proposed by Stirton et al. (1967).

The cladogram below shows its placement within Zygomaturinae as the basalmost taxon, from Black & Mackness (1999).

- Diprotodontoidea
  - Palorchestidae
  - Diprotodontidae
    - Diprotodontinae
      - - Ngapakaldia
        - Pitikantia
      - - Bematherium
        - - Pyramios
          - - - Meniscolophus
              - Euowenia
            - - Euryzygoma
              - Diprotodon
    - Zygomaturinae
      - Silvabestius
      - - Alkwertatherium
        - - Nimbadon
          - - - Plaisiodon
              - Kolopsoides
            - - Neohelos
              - - Kolopsis
                - - - Maokopia
                    - Hulitherium
                  - Zygomaturus

The most recent phylogenetic analysis to be conducted which included Silvabestius was the one published by Arthur Crichton and colleagues in 2023 in their description of Mukupirna fortidentata. Their analysis used a slightly modified character set from Beck et al. (2020) and found it to be a basal diprotodontoid, not as derived as palorchestids and diprotodontids, but more derived than Raemeotherium.

== Paleobiology ==
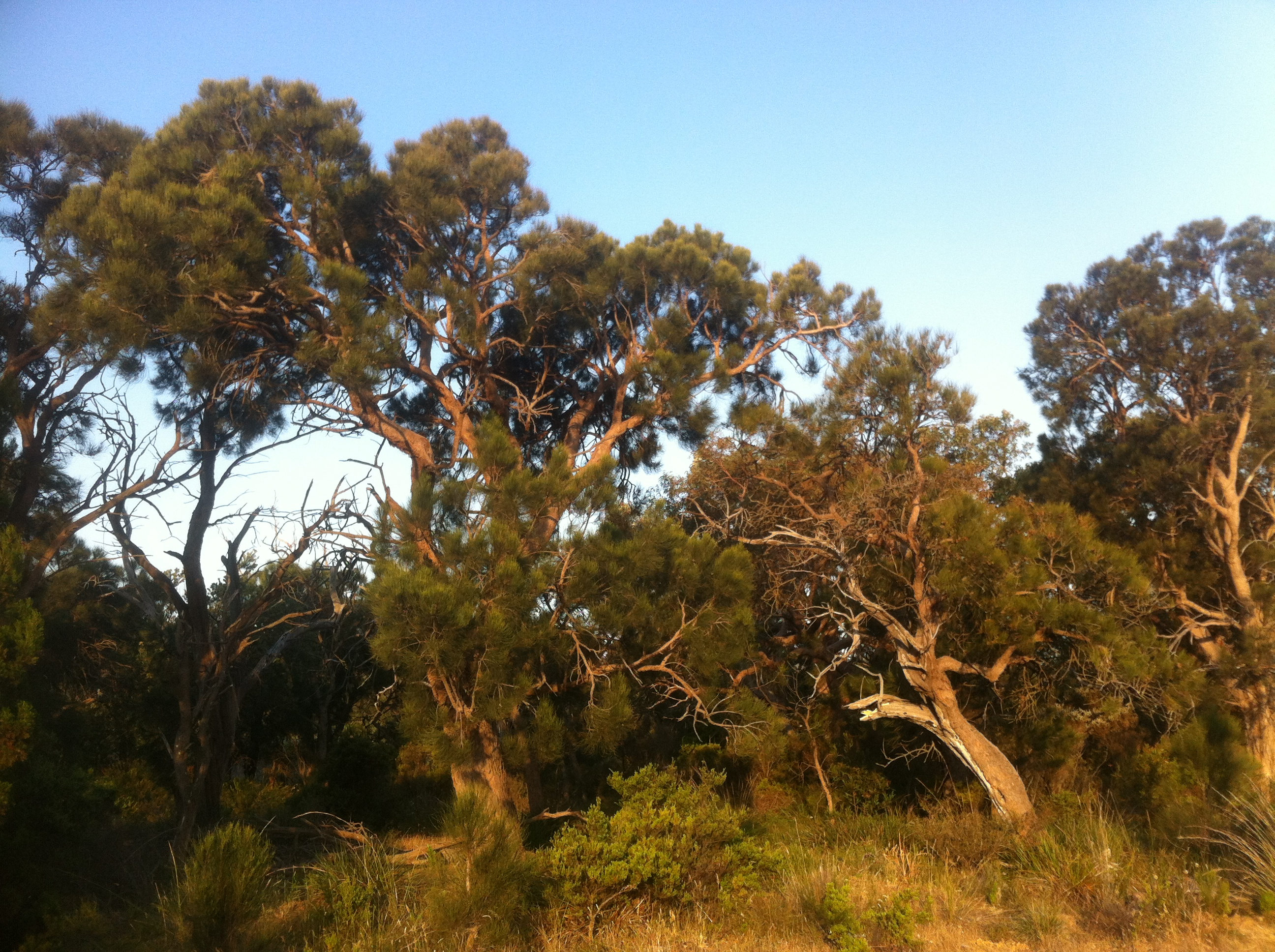
Silvabestius likely inhabited open forest or woodland habitat.

All known species of Silvabestius have been found in late Oligocene-aged deposits at the Riversleigh World Heritage Area in the northwest of Queensland. Fossils of S. johnnilandi have been recovered from the VIP Site, whereas S. michaelbirti stems from the Hiatus site. A third possible species was discovered at Site D. During the Oligocene, Riversleigh would have been covered in woodland or open forest. These forests would have been dominated by trees or shrubs from the family Casuarinaceae. Patches of rainforest may have also been present, specifically around pools or along watercourses. Silvabestius lived alongside other diprotodontids like Neohelos tirarensis and Ngapakaldia bonythoni; the palorchestid Propalorchestes ponticulus; the propleopine Ekaltadeta ima; and the vombatoid Marada arcanum.
