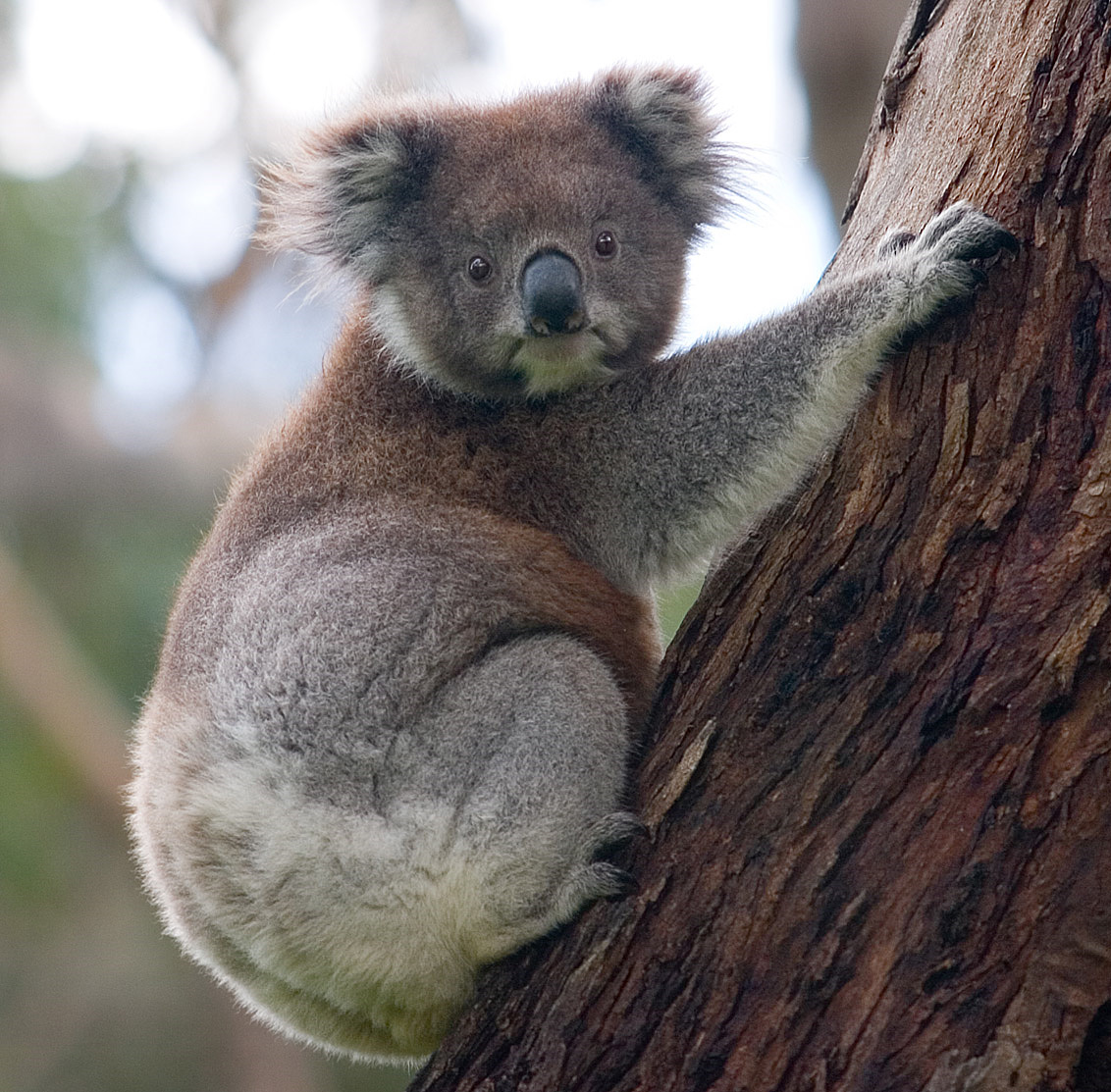
- Phascolarctos cinereus

Scientific classification
- Kingdom: Animalia
- Phylum: Chordata
- Class: Mammalia
- Infraclass: Marsupialia
- Order: Diprotodontia
- Suborder: Vombatiformes; Burnett, 1830

Families
- †Thylacoleonidae; Phascolarctidae; Vombatomorphia; †Wynyardiidae; †Ilariidae; Vombatoidea; †Maradidae; †Mukupirnidae; Vombatidae; Diprotodontoidea; †Diprotodontidae; †Palorchestidae

= Vombatiformes =

Vombatiformes Temporal range: Late Oligocene - Recent

Suborder of marsupials

The Vombatiformes are one of the three suborders of the large marsupial order Diprotodontia. Seven of the nine known families within this suborder are extinct; only the families Phascolarctidae, with the koala, and Vombatidae, with three extant species of wombat, survive.

Among the extinct families are the Diprotodontidae, which includes the largest marsupials ever, including the rhinoceros sized Diprotodon, as well as the "marsupial lions" Thylacoleonidae and "marsupial tapirs" Palorchestidae.

== Classification ==
After

- - - †Thylacoleonidae
      - - †Microleo attenboroughi
        - †Enigmaleo archeri
      - - †Lekaneleo
          - †Lekaneleo roskellyae
          - †Lekaneleo myersi
        - - †Wakaleo
            - †Wakaleo pitikantensis
            - - †Wakaleo schouteni
              - †Wakaleo oldfieldi
              - - †Wakaleo vanderfeueri
                - †Wakaleo alcootaensis
          - †Thylacoleo
            - †Thylacoleo hilli
            - - †Thylacoleo crassidentatus
              - †Thylacoleo carnifex
  - - Phascolarctidae
      - †Priscakoala
      - - - †Madakoala
          - †Perikoala robustus
        - - †Nimiokoala greystanesi
          - - †Litokoala
              - †Litokoala dicksmithi
              - †Litokoala kutjamarpensis
            - Phascolarctos
              - Phascolarctos cinereus (modern koala)
              - †Phascolarctos sulcomaxilliaris
              - †Phascolarctos stirtoni
    - - †Ilariidae
        - †Ilaria spp.
        - †Kuterintja ngama
        - †Koalemas
      - - †Wynyardiidae
          - †Namilamadeta spp.
          - †Muramura spp.
          - †Wynyardia
        - Vombatomorphia
          - Vombatoidea
            - †Mukupirna nambensis
            - Vombatidae
              - †Nimbavombatus boodjamullensis
              - - †Warendja wakefieldi
                - - Lasiorhinus
                    - Lasiorhinus krefftii (northern hairy-nosed wombat)
                    - Lasiorhinus latifrons (southern hairy-nosed wombat)
                  - - Vombatus
                      - Vombatus ursinus (common wombat)
                      - †Vombatus hacketti (Hackett's wombat)
                    - - †Ramsayia
                        - †Ramsayia magna
                        - †Ramsayia lemleyi
                      - - †Sedophascolomys medius
                        - †Phascolonus gigas
          - †Diprotodontoidea
            - †Silvabestius spp.
            - - †Ngapakaldia spp.
              - - - †Nimbadon
                  - †Neohelos
                - - †Palorchestidae
                    - †Propalorchestes
                    - †Palorchestes
                      - †Palorchestes painei
                      - †Palorchestes azael
                  - †Kolopsis
                  - - †Diprotodon
                    - - †Zygomaturus
                      - †Euryzygoma

Suborder Vombatiformes

- Family †Thylacoleonidae: (marsupial lions)
  - Genus Microleo
  - Genus Priscileo
  - Genus Thylacoleo
  - Genus Wakaleo
- Infraorder Phascolarctomorphia
  - Family Phascolarctidae: koalas
    - Genus Phascolarctos (one living species)
    - Genus †Koobor
    - Genus †Litokoala
    - Genus †Madakoala
    - Genus †Nimiokoala
    - Genus †Perikoala
- Infraorder Vombatomorphia
  - Family †Ilariidae
    - Genus Ilaria
    - Genus Koalemas
    - Genus Kuterintja
  - Family †Wynyardiidae
    - Genus Muramura
    - Genus Namilamadeta
    - Genus Wynyardia
  - Superfamily Vombatoidea
    - Family Vombatidae: wombats (two living genera)
      - Genus Lasiorhinus
      - Genus Vombatus
      - Genus †Rhizophascolonus
      - Genus †Phascolonus
      - Genus †Warendja
      - Genus †Ramsayia
      - Genus †Sedophascolomys
    - Family †Maradidae
      - Genus Marada
    - Genus Nimbavombatus (either considered the most basal vombatid or just outside Vombatidae)
    - Family †Mukupirnidae
      - Genus Mukupirna
  - Superfamily †Diprotodontoidea
    - Genus †Silvabestius
    - Genus †Ngapakaldia
    - Genus †Nimbadon
    - Genus †Neohelos
    - Family †Diprotodontidae:
      - Genus Alkwertatherium
      - Genus Bematherium
      - Genus Diprotodon
      - Genus Euowenia
      - Genus Euryzygoma
      - Genus Meniscolophus
      - Genus Nototherium
      - Genus Pyramios
      - Genus Sthenomerus
      - Subfamily †Zygomaturinae
        - Genus Hulitherium
        - Genus Kolopsis
        - Genus Kolopsoides
        - Genus Maokopia
        - Genus Neohelos
        - Genus Plaisiodon
        - Genus Raemeotherium
        - Genus Zygomaturus
    - Family †Palorchestidae: (marsupial tapirs)
      - Genus Palorchestes
      - Genus Pitikantia
      - Genus Propalorchestes
