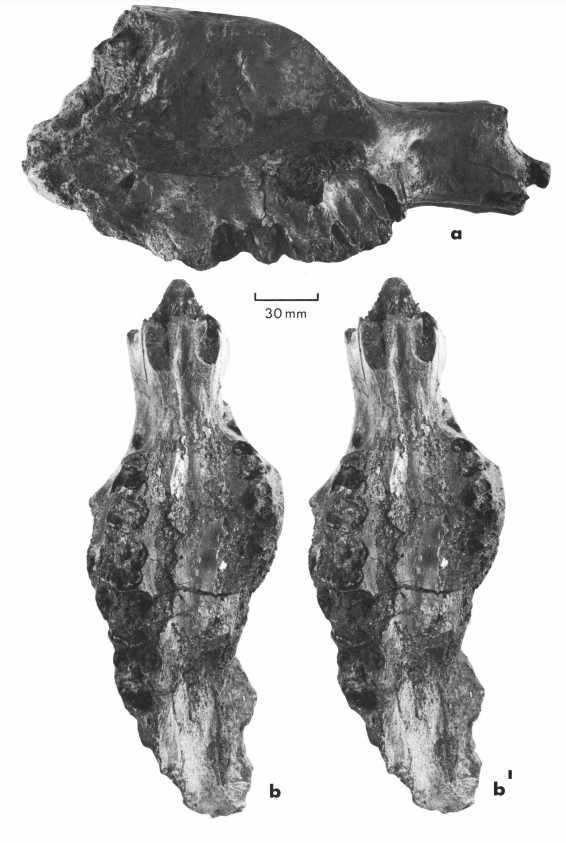
- Side (a) and underside (b) views of the Hulitherium skull
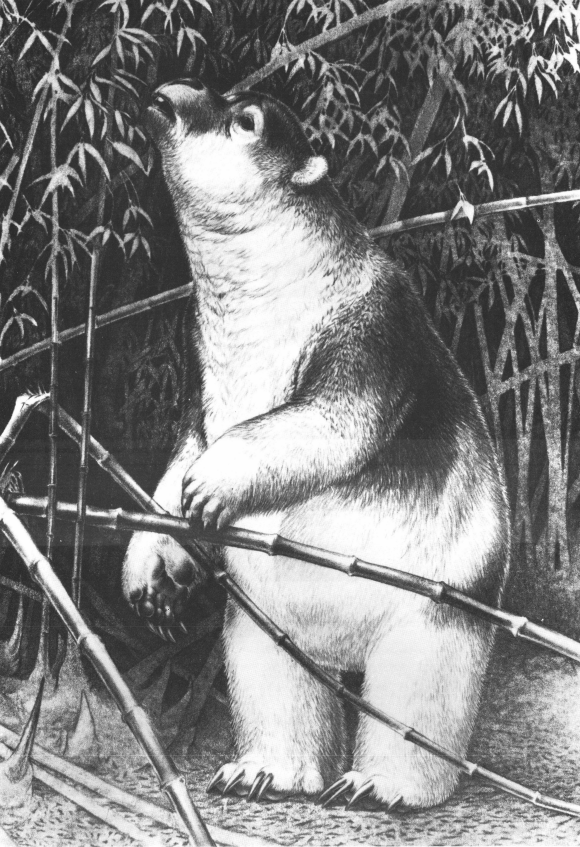
- Hulitherium restoration

Scientific classification
- Kingdom: Animalia
- Phylum: Chordata
- Class: Mammalia
- Infraclass: Marsupialia
- Order: Diprotodontia
- Family: †Diprotodontidae
- Subfamily: †Zygomaturinae
- Genus: †Hulitherium; Flannery & Plane, 1986
- Species: †H. tomasetti

Binomial name
- †Hulitherium tomasetti Flannery & Plane, 1986

= Hulitherium =

Hulitherium Temporal range: 0.0411–0.0361 Ma Late Pleistocene

Extinct genus of marsupials

Hulitherium tomasetti (meaning "Huli beast", after the Huli people) is an extinct zygomaturine marsupial that lived in New Guinea during the Pleistocene. The specific name honours Berard Tomasetti, a Catholic priest in Papua New Guinea, who brought the fossils to the attention of experts.

== Discovery ==
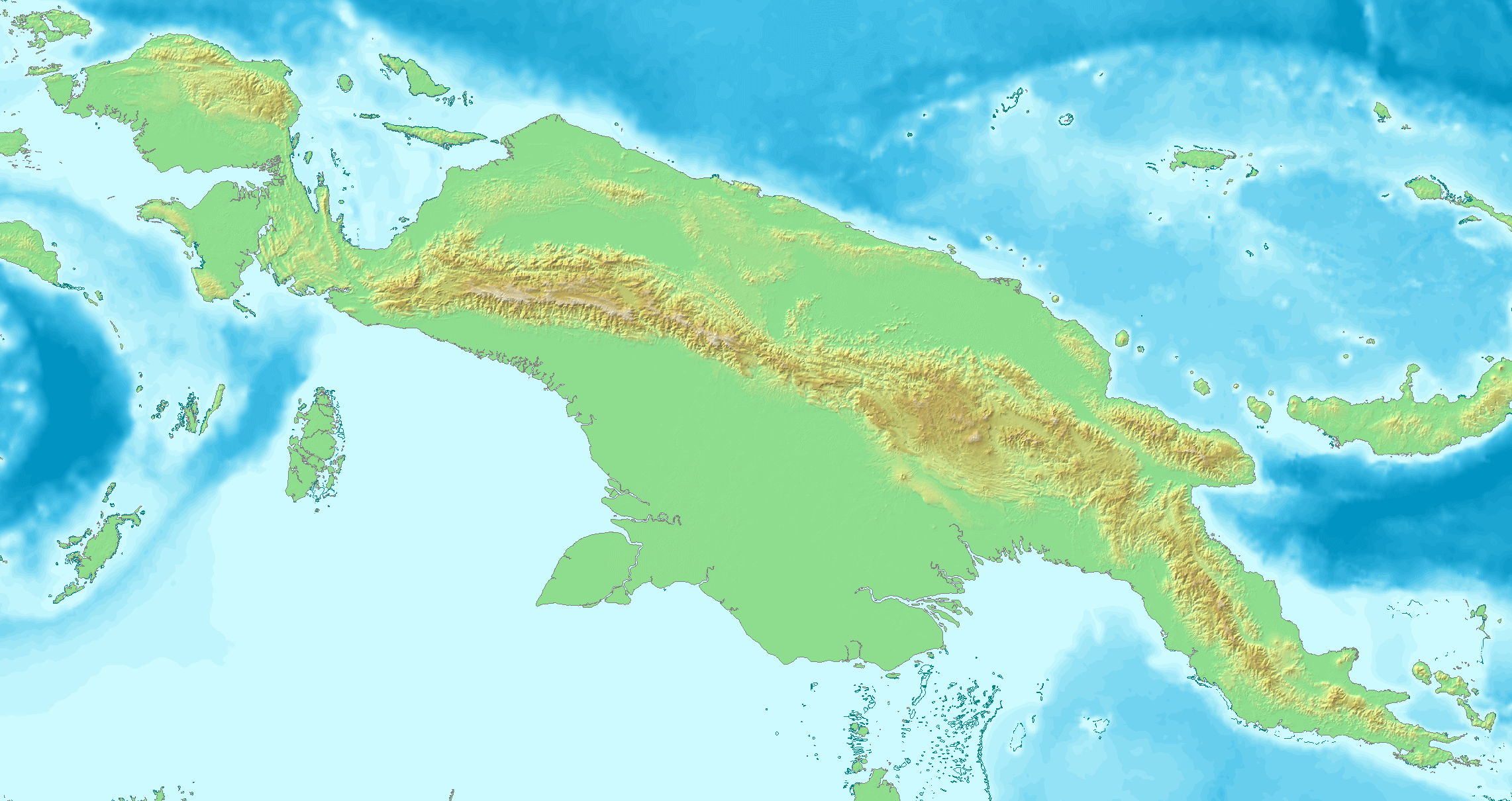
Location of Hulitherium type locality

While excavating a bank to widen the Pureni Mission airstrip in Wabag, New Guinea, to comply with new regulations, the Huli workers unearthed fossils in 1967. They reportedly were frightened by their discovery as bones in their culture are associated with the ancestors, so the material was somewhat damaged by their inquisitive prodding until they were brought to the attention of Father Berard Tomasetti, who recognized the significance. Geologists Paul Williams and Michael Plane subsequently headed field expeditions in the area beginning in 1969 in search of more remains.

Among the material was the partial skeleton of a diprotodontid, catalogue number CPC 25718, comprising: a well-preserved skull, several detached teeth, a fragment of the mandible, some cervical vertebrae (neck vertebrae), an almost complete humerus (in the forelimb), and some fragments from a femur and tibia (the hindlimb). In 1986, mammalogist Tim Flannery and Plane described it as Hulitherium tomasetti, the generic name honouring the indigenous Huli people for discovering the creature, and the specific name honoring Father Tomasetti who ensured it was brought to scientific eyes.

A log discovered in the same bed as the holotype was carbon dated to roughly 38,600 ± 2,500 years ago. The Pureni site is a 2,000 m (6,600 ft) marine limestone sequence stretching from the Late Oligocene to the Pliocene, until it was filled in by lava about 850,000 years ago by Mount Iumu during the Middle Pleistocene. Infrequent volcanism in the area continued from Mount Rentoul, Mount Sisa, and Doma Peaks. The most recent deposits dating to the Holocene consist of peat, clay, and ash.

== Anatomy ==
In either half of the upper jaw, Hulitherium has three incisors (I^{1–3}), no canines, one premolar (P^{3}), and five molars (M^{1–5}). As for the lower jaw, it is only known that it has a premolar (P_{3}) and five molars (M_{1–5}) on either side. The first incisor was the largest, and the second the smallest. Hulitherium has an unusually high-arched palate (the roof of the mouth). The snout is quite narrow and has an almost-oval-shaped cross-section. The frontal bone (forehead) juts up suddenly from the snout, and there is a depression on its midline. The eye sockets are placed fairly low on the skull, about 3 cm (1.2 in) above the P^{3} socket. There is a weak sagittal crest running along the midline of the braincase. The pterygoid bones (behind the mouth) were probably enlarged.

The atlas (the first cervical vertebra, in the neck) is somewhat more reinforced than might be expected for its skull size, though the occipital condyles (which jut out from the skull to connect to the atlas) are unusually short relative to other marsupials. Another cervical vertebral centrum was preserved, measuring only 16 mm (0.63 in), which may indicate Hulitherium had a short neck.

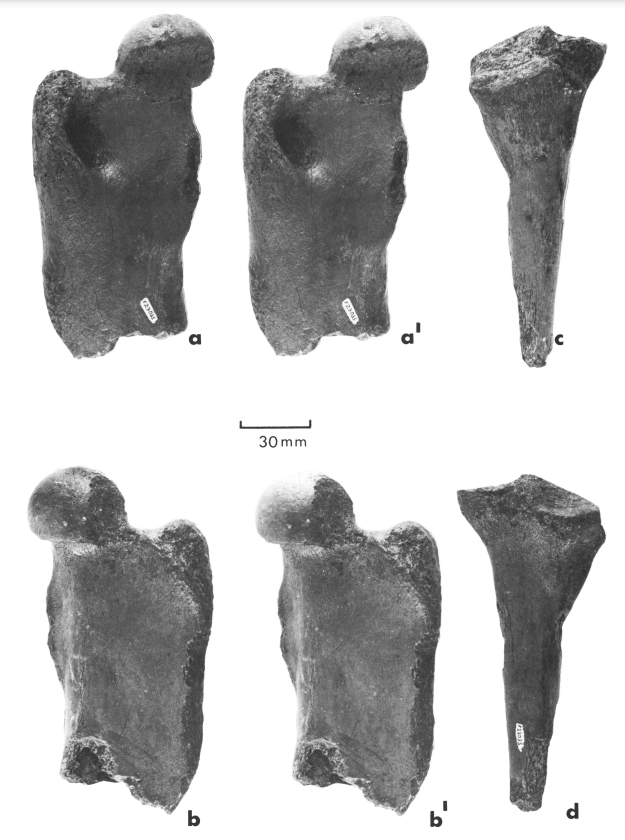
Hulitherium proximal femur (a and b) and tibia (c and d)

The only elements of the forelimb known are a single right humerus (missing some of the middle portion) and a poorly preserved distal radial fragment (towards the wrist joint). The proximal humerus (towards the shoulder joint) as 180° of articulating surface (the part of the bone forming the shoulder joint) in the anteroposterior (front-to-back) direction, indicating considerable mobility especially in that direction. Its middle portion is remarkably narrow, only 32 mm (1.3 in) at its smallest laterally and 23 mm (0.91 in) at its smallest anteroposteriorly. The two condyles of the humerus at the elbow joint also have 180° of articular surfacing, much like in kangaroos rather than other diprotodontids.

The elements of the hindlimb known are a single left femur (missing some of the middle portion), a gracile right tibia (missing the distal portion towards the ankle joint), and what is probably a fibular fragment. Unusually for diprotodontids, the femoral neck is greatly reduced, so that the femoral head lies directly on top of the femoral shaft and sticks out of the femur quite pronouncedly, which may have enhanced the mobility of the hip.

== Biology ==
Hulitherium lived in montane rain forests and was proposed in its initial description to have fed on bamboo, as a kind-of marsupial analogue of the giant panda. It was one of New Guinea's largest mammals, standing at 1 m (3 ft) tall, close to 2 m (6 ft) long, and with an estimated weight of 75–200 kilograms (165–441 lb). Flannery and Plane (1986) suggested that because little had changed since the Late Pleistocene, humans may have been the major factor that led to its extinction. The head of the femur lies directly above the shaft, which along with the morphology of the humerus-ulnar joint, suggests that Hulitherium reared up on its hind legs to feed. Dental microwear results support that Hulitherium was a browser that fed on soft plant material, rather than on fibrous bamboo.

== Other relatives ==
Murray (1992) concluded that Hulitherium is most closely related to the New Guinean Maokopia, and that these two together are most closely related to Kolopsis rotundus also from New Guinea. Black and Mackness (1999) suggested that the Hulitherium clade is more closely related to the clade comprising Zygomaturus plus another undescribed genus from Australia, than it is to Kolopsis.

== See also ==
- Silvabestius
- Neohelos

== Sources ==
- David Norman. (2001): The Big Book Of Dinosaurs. Pg.133, Welcome Books.
- Wildlife of Gondwana: Dinosaurs and Other Vertebrates from the Ancient Supercontinent (Life of the Past) by Pat Vickers Rich, Thomas Hewitt Rich, Francesco Coffa, and Steven Morton
- Australia's Lost World: Prehistoric Animals of Riversleigh by Michael Archer, Suzanne J. Hand, and Henk Godthelp
- Classification of Mammals by Malcolm C. McKenna and Susan K. Bell
- Extinctions in Near Time: Causes, Contexts, and Consequences (Advances in Vertebrate Paleobiology) by Ross D.E. MacPhee and Hans-Dieter Sues
- https://www.seraphicmass.org/news/berard/panegyric.htm
- McBride, Malachy. "Welcome, Mbilai. That is your name now". seraphicmass.org. Archived from the original on 5 October 2007.
