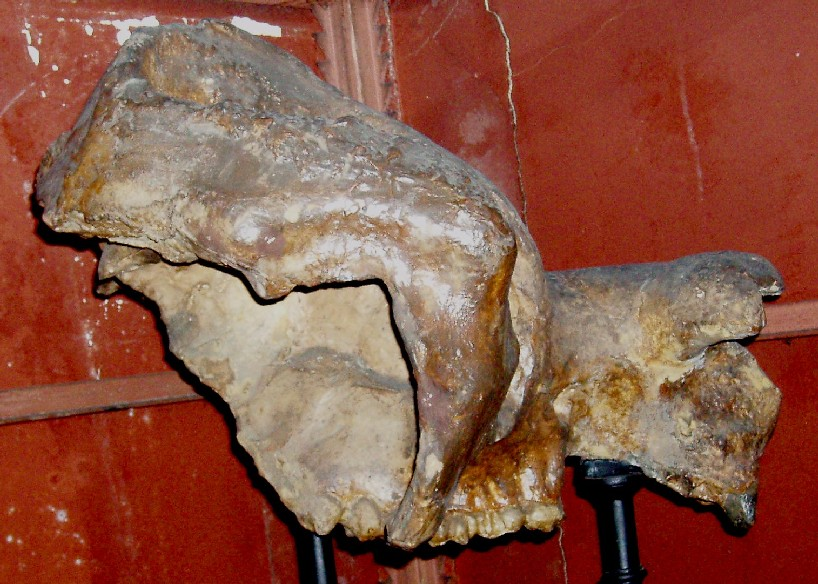
- Fossil skull
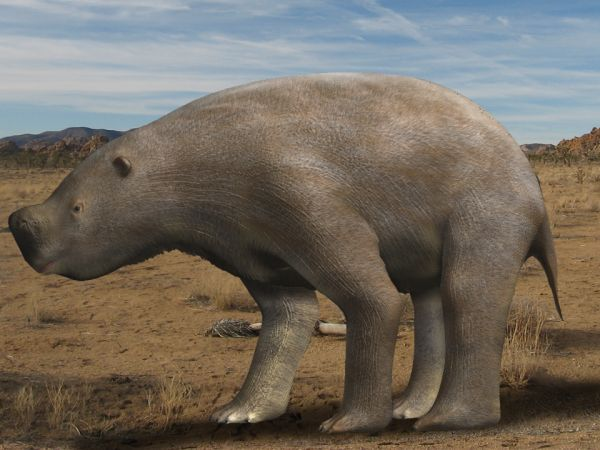
- Life reconstruction of Nototherium mitcheli

Scientific classification
- Kingdom: Animalia
- Phylum: Chordata
- Class: Mammalia
- Infraclass: Marsupialia
- Order: Diprotodontia
- Family: †Diprotodontidae
- Genus: †Nototherium; Owen, 1845

Type species
- Nototherium inerme Owen, 1845

Species
- See text

= Nototherium =

Nototherium Temporal range: Pliocene–Pleistocene

Extinct genus of marsupials

Nototherium, from Ancient Greek νότος (nótos), meaning "south", and θηρίον (thēríon), meaning "beast", is an extinct genus of diprotodontid marsupial from Australia and New Guinea. This marsupial had hypsodont molars and weighed around 500 kg. It was a relative of the larger Diprotodon and a distant kin to modern wombats.

== Species ==
- Nototherium inerme Owen, 1845
- Nototherium watutense Anderson, 1937 (formerly considered to be a member of Kolopsis) Plio-Pleistocene, New Guinea.
- Nototherium mitchelli Owen, 1845 Pleistocene, Australia (possibly a junior synonym of N. inerme)
