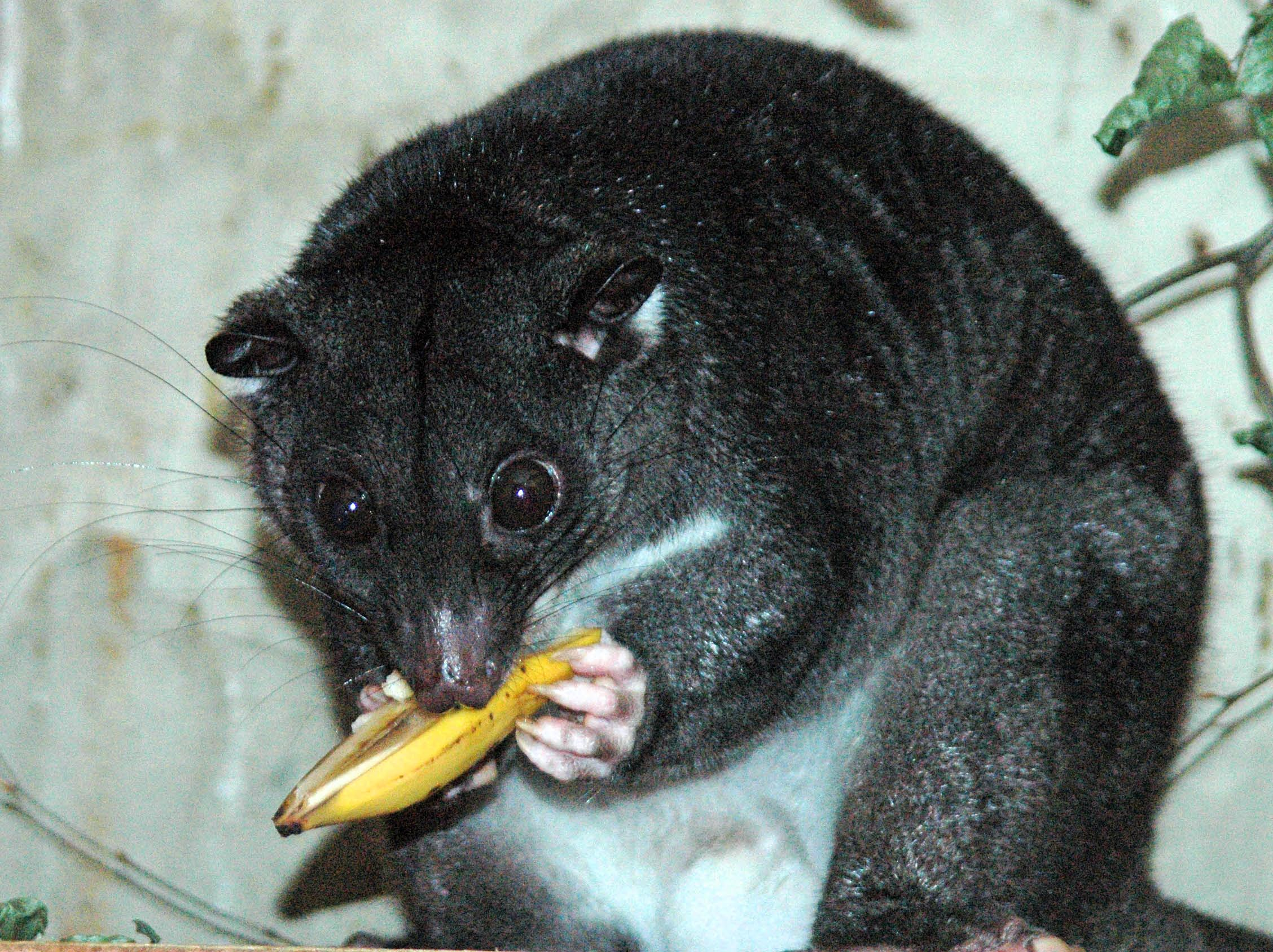
- Ground cuscus

Scientific classification
- Domain: Eukaryota
- Kingdom: Animalia
- Phylum: Chordata
- Class: Mammalia
- Infraclass: Marsupialia
- Order: Diprotodontia
- Suborder: Phalangerida

Families
- Phalangeridae: brushtail possums and cuscuses Burramyidae: pygmy possums Tarsipedidae: Honey possum Petauridae: (Striped possum, Leadbeater's possum, and gliders); Pseudocheiridae: ringtailed possums and allies Potoridae: bettongs, potaroos and rat kangaroos Acrobatidae: (Feathertail glider and Feathertail possum); Hypsiprymnodontidae: Musky rat-kangaroo Macropodidae: kangaroos, wallabies and allies

= Phalangerida =

Suborder of marsupials

Phalangerida is one of the two former suborders of the large marsupial order Diprotodontia. This large and diverse suborder included kangaroos, wallabies, quokkas, possums, gliding possum-like marsupials and others. The much smaller suborder Vombatiformes encompasses only the koalas and wombats. This suborder is no longer considered to accurately describe the diversity in Diprotodontia.

Phalangeriformes has come to replace Phalangerida but does not include the potoroos (Potoroidae), kangaroos and wallabies (Macropodidae) or the musky rat-kangaroo (Hypsiprymnodontidae). These families are now placed in a new suborder named Macropodiformes.
