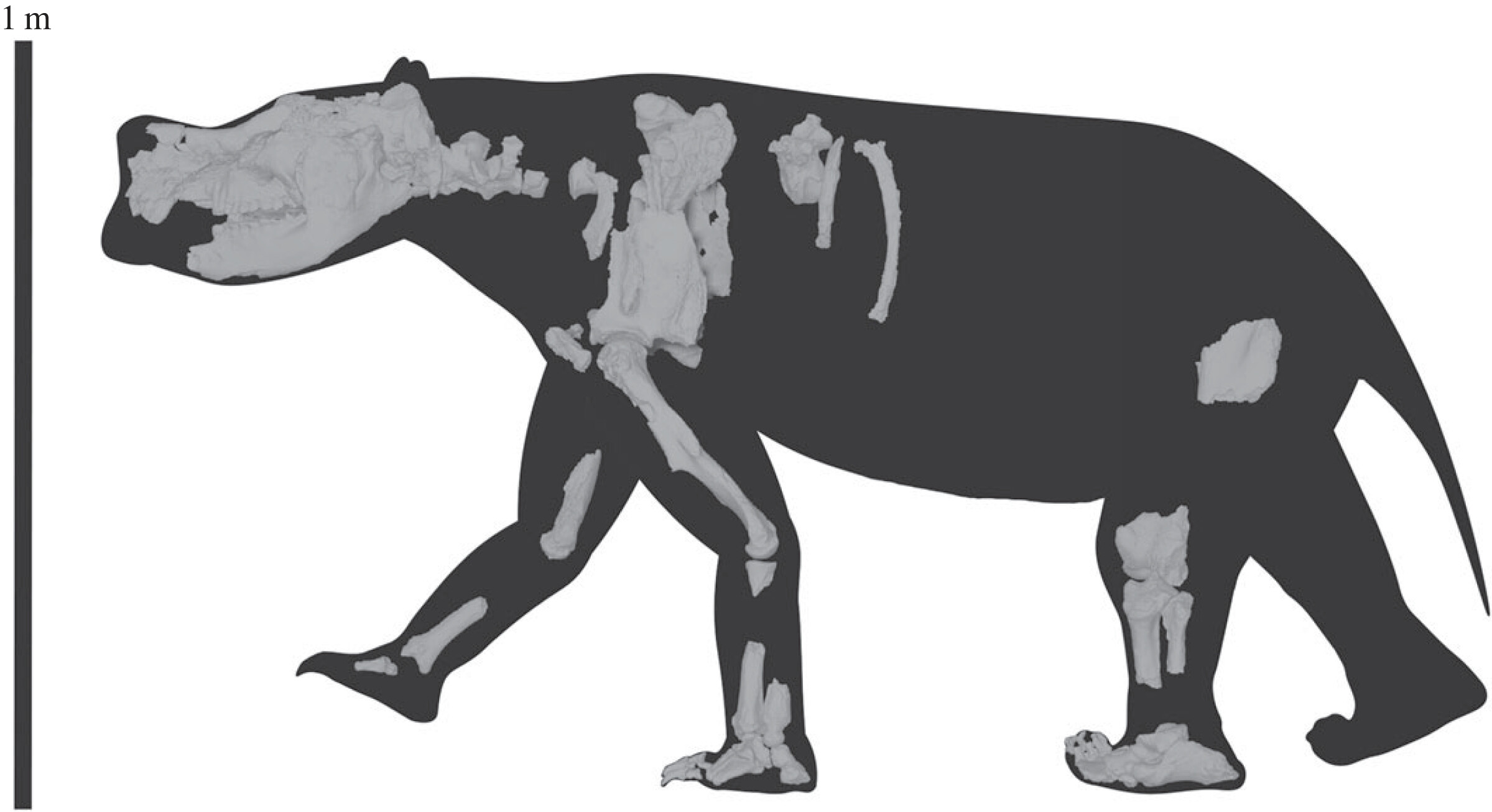

Scientific classification
- Kingdom: Animalia
- Phylum: Chordata
- Class: Mammalia
- Infraclass: Marsupialia
- Order: Diprotodontia
- Family: †Diprotodontidae
- Genus: †Ambulator van Zoelen et al., 2023
- Species: †A. keanei

Binomial name
- †Ambulator keanei (Stirton, 1967)

= Ambulator =

Ambulator Temporal range: Pliocene, 3.9 Ma

Extinct genus of mammals

Ambulator is an extinct genus of marsupials belonging to the family Diprotodontidae. It contains one species, A. keanei, whose remains were found in the Pliocene-aged Tirari Formation of South Australia. A. keanei was previously included in the genus Zygomaturus, but was moved to the new genus Ambulator in 2023. Features of its limbs suggest that Ambulator was better adapted to quadrupedal walking than earlier diprotodontids.
