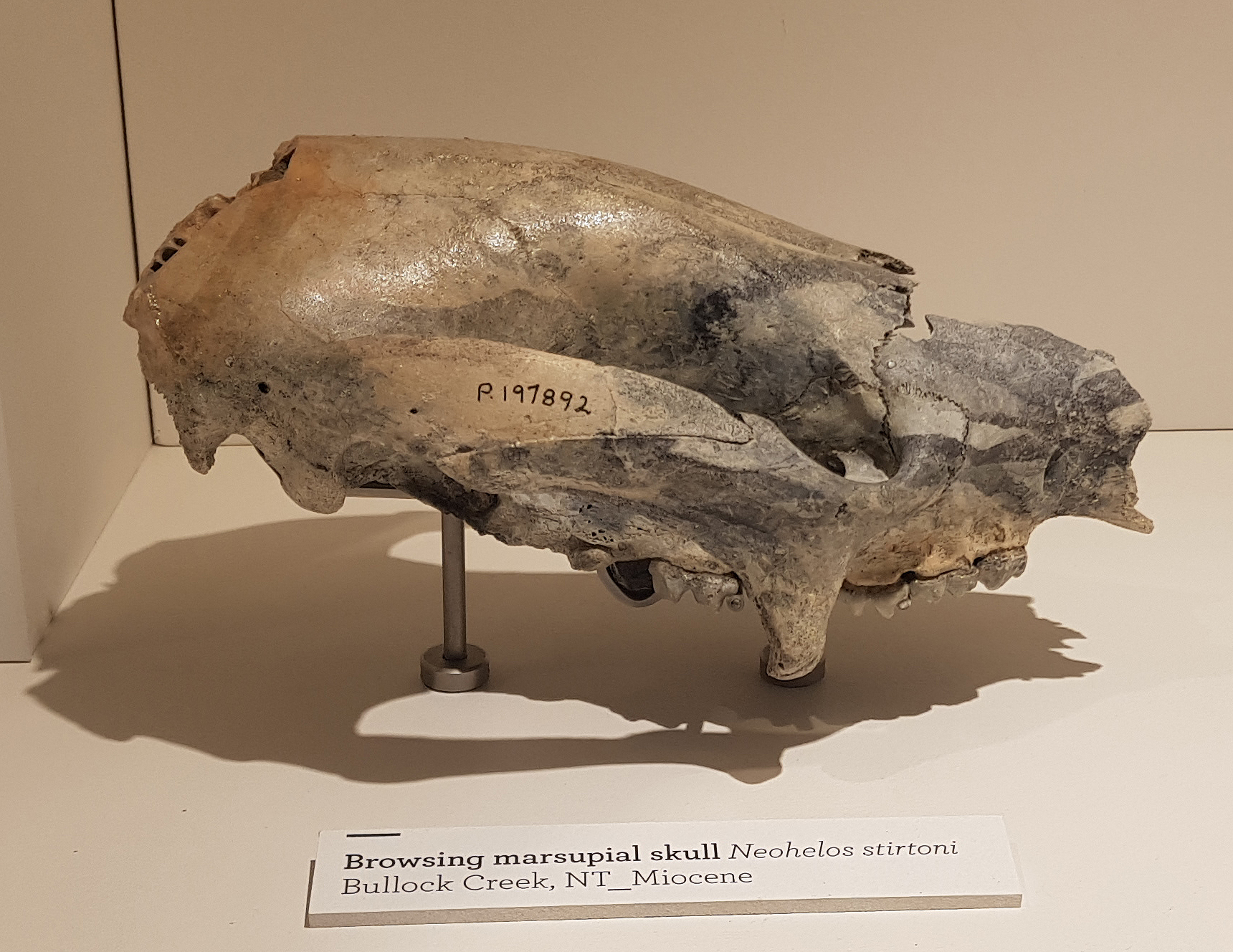
- Skull of Neohelos stirtoni at the Melbourne Museum

Scientific classification
- Kingdom: Animalia
- Phylum: Chordata
- Class: Mammalia
- Infraclass: Marsupialia
- Order: Diprotodontia
- Family: †Diprotodontidae
- Subfamily: †Zygomaturinae
- Genus: †Neohelos; Stirton, 1967

Type species
- Neohelos tirarensis Stirton, 1967

Species
- N. tirarensis Stirton, 1967; N. stirtoni Murray et al., 2000; N. solus Black et al., 2013; N. davidridei Black et al., 2013

= Neohelos =

Neohelos Temporal range: Miocene, 23–12 Ma

Extinct genus of marsupials

Neohelos is an extinct diprotodontid marsupial, that lived from the early to middle-Miocene. There are four species assigned to this genus, Neohelos tirarensis, the type species, N. stirtoni, N. solus and N. davidridei. N. davidridei is the most derived species of the genus, and its premolar morphology shows that it is structurally and ancestor of the genus Kolopsis. All four species are from the Bullock Creek in the Northern Territory and Riversleigh in Queensland, both in Australia.

== Description ==
Neohelos is known from many specimens, assigned to all the species. N. tirarensis includes a partial skull, premaxillas, maxillas, teeth, and dentaries; N. solus is known from a maxilla and dentary; N. davidridei includes teeth and a maxilla fragment; and N. stirtoni is known from a mostly complete skull, a maxilla and a dentary.

=== Distinguishing characteristics ===
A revision of Neohelos found a set of features in all the species that are absent in all other diprotodontoids. They are listed below:

- four−cusped P3 with a tall, subcentral parametacone, a distinct anterior parastyle, a moderately developed protocone and a small to moderate (sometimes absent) hypocone;
- tendency to develop a mesostyle on P3;
- M1 with well−developed stylar cusp A, stylar cusp E and postmetacrista;
- M1 with a square occlusal outline (except N. solus);
- large interproximal contact between P3 and M1;
- broad, lanceolate i1 with a ventrobuccal groove and longitudinal lingual crest;
- and moderate epitympanic fenestra in the postglenoid cavity.

== Classification ==
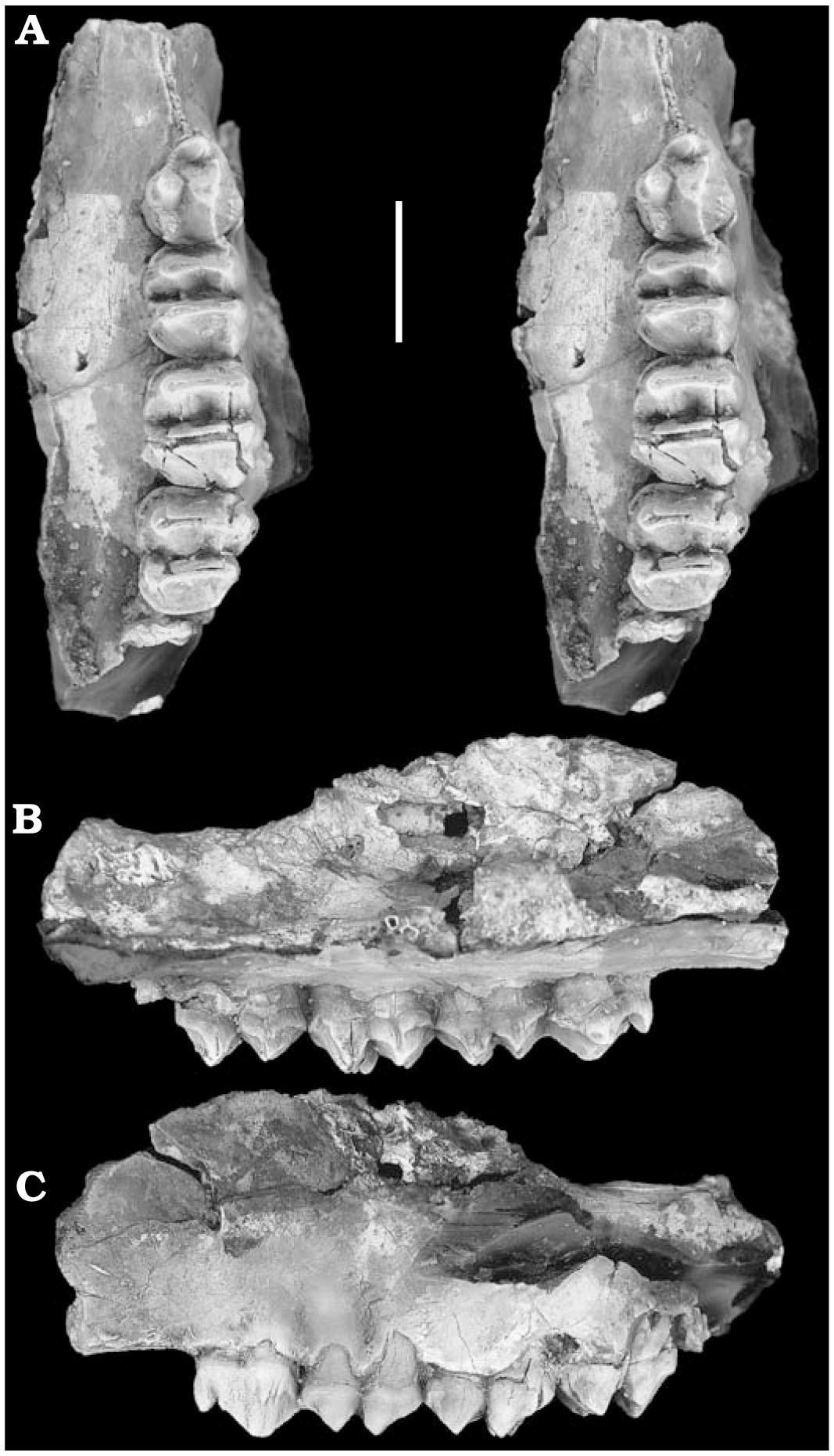
N. solus holotype

Neohelos includes many species. Among them, N. davidridei is the most derived. N. davidridei shows many features that are also found in Kolopsis, and is thought to be the ancestor of it and its species. Together, Neohelos and Kolopsis make up Zygomaturinae along with Zygomaturus and other genera.

== Paleoecology ==
Neohelos lived in the early to Middle Miocene of Queensland, Australia. It is one of a few diprotodont genera that existed in all three of Bullock Creek in the Northern Territory, Riversleigh in Queensland, and the Wipajiri Formation of South Australia.
