= Raemeotherium =

Raemeotherium Temporal range: Late Oligocene

Scientific classification
- Domain: Eukaryota
- Kingdom: Animalia
- Phylum: Chordata
- Class: Mammalia
- Infraclass: Marsupialia
- Order: Diprotodontia
- Family: †Diprotodontidae
- Subfamily: †Zygomaturinae
- Genus: †Raemeotherium; Rich et al., 1978
- Species: †R. yatkolai

Binomial name
- †Raemeotherium yatkolai Rich et al., 1978

Extinct genus of marsupials

Raemeotherium is an extinct genus of marsupial of the family Diprotodontidae. Only one species has been described, Raemeotherium yatkolai, from the Late Oligocene Namba Formation of South Australia.

== History and naming ==
In late 1976, Ian Stewart of the National Museum of Victoria discovered the dentary of a diprotodontid at the south end of Lake Pinpa, South Australia. The dentary, along with isolated teeth collected from the same area, were described in 1978 by Australian palaeontologists Tom H. Rich, Michael Archer and Richard H. Tedford. These remains were given the name Raemeotherium yatkolai and originate from a layer of the Oligocene-aged Namba Formation.

The genus name is a combination of the acronym for the Royal Australian Electrical and Mechanical Engineers (RAEME) and the Ancient Greek therion ("beast"). The species name honours the late Daniel Yatkola, a student of mammalian palaeontology.

== Description ==
A combination of traits can be used to distinguish Raemeotherium from all other diprotodontids: the protocristid on the second molar is positioned buccally (towards the cheek) from the protoconid; the presence of a well-developed entocristid on all molars; and the ascending ramus lies at a much lower angle than in other diprotodontids. In addition, the second molar retains well-developed paracristid and protocristid crests. Cristid obliqua are present on all molars.

Hand et al. (1993) noted that its size was probably smaller than Nimbadon.

== Classification ==
In its description in 1978, Raemeotherium was thought to have been the most plesiomorphic diprotodontid and referable to the subfamily Zygomaturinae. The authors who described the taxon also, however, noted that there are no apomorphies that preclude it from representing a basal macropoid. Black & Archer (1997) suggested that there is still some doubt to its taxonomic identity.

== Paleobiology ==
Raemeotherium is derived from the Pinpa LF of the Late Oligocene Namba Formation, which has an estimated date range of 26-24 Ma. At the time, the area would have been a rainforest environment surrounding swamps. It would have been dominated by gymnosperms, casuarinaceae and Nothofagus. Raemeotherium coexisted in this environment with a variety of fish, turtles, lizards, crocodilians, birds and mammals.
