= Marada arcanum =

Marada arcanum Temporal range: Upper Oligocene

Scientific classification
- Kingdom: Animalia
- Phylum: Chordata
- Class: Mammalia
- Infraclass: Marsupialia
- Order: Diprotodontia
- Superfamily: Vombatoidea
- Family: †Maradidae; Black, 2007
- Genus: †Marada; Black, 2007
- Species: †M. arcanum

Binomial name
- †Marada arcanum Black, 2007

Extinct species of marsupial

Marada arcanum is an extinct species of marsupial discovered in 2001 at the Oligocene Hiatus Site at Riversleigh. It is the only member of the genus Marada (lit. 'flat', referring to the morphology of dentary). It exhibits plesiomorphic and apomorphic features making the determination of its taxonomic placement difficult. It has been placed within its own family, Maradidae. The specimen consists of the right dentary, with the first incisor but missing the crown, the whole of the horizontal ramus with intact premolar three and molars one to four. The posterior is missing the coronoid process, the articular condyle and the angular process.

The new species, genus, and family were described in 2007 by the Australian palaeontologist Karen Black
