= Sthenomerus =

Scientific classification
- Domain: Eukaryota
- Kingdom: Animalia
- Phylum: Chordata
- Class: Mammalia
- Infraclass: Marsupialia
- Order: Diprotodontia
- Family: †Diprotodontidae
- Genus: †Sthenomerus de Vis, 1883

Extinct genus of marsupials

Sthenomerus is an extinct genus of Diprotodontia.
