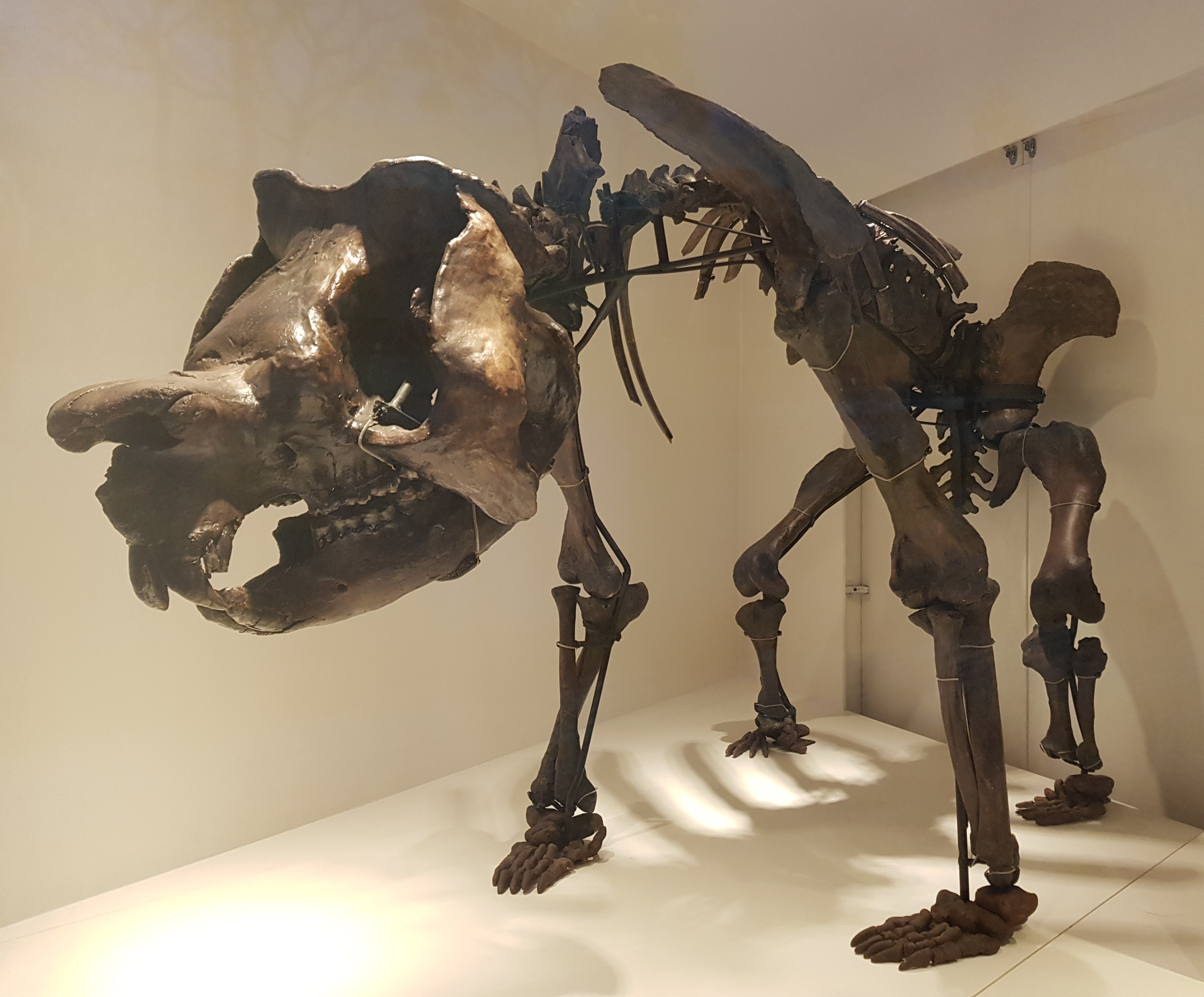
- Skeletal mount of Zygomaturus trilobus at the Melbourne Museum
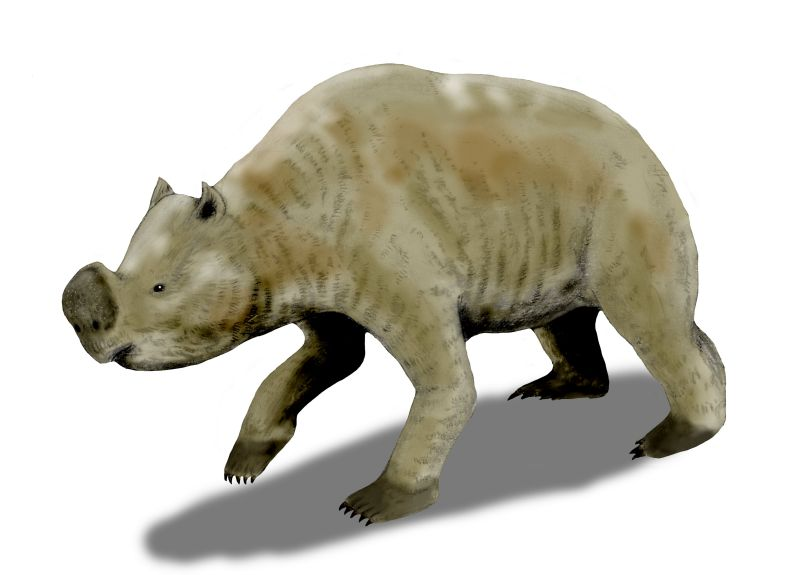
- Restoration of Z. trilobus

Scientific classification
- Kingdom: Animalia
- Phylum: Chordata
- Class: Mammalia
- Infraclass: Marsupialia
- Order: Diprotodontia
- Family: †Diprotodontidae
- Subfamily: †Zygomaturinae
- Genus: †Zygomaturus; Macleay, 1857

Species
- †Zygomaturus diahotensis; †Zygomaturus gilli (Nomen dubium); †Zygomaturus tasmanicus; †Zygomaturus trilobus

= Zygomaturus =

Zygomaturus Temporal range: Late Miocene–Late Pleistocene

Extinct genus of marsupials

Zygomaturus is an extinct genus of giant marsupial belonging to the family Diprotodontidae which inhabited Australia from the Late Miocene to Late Pleistocene.

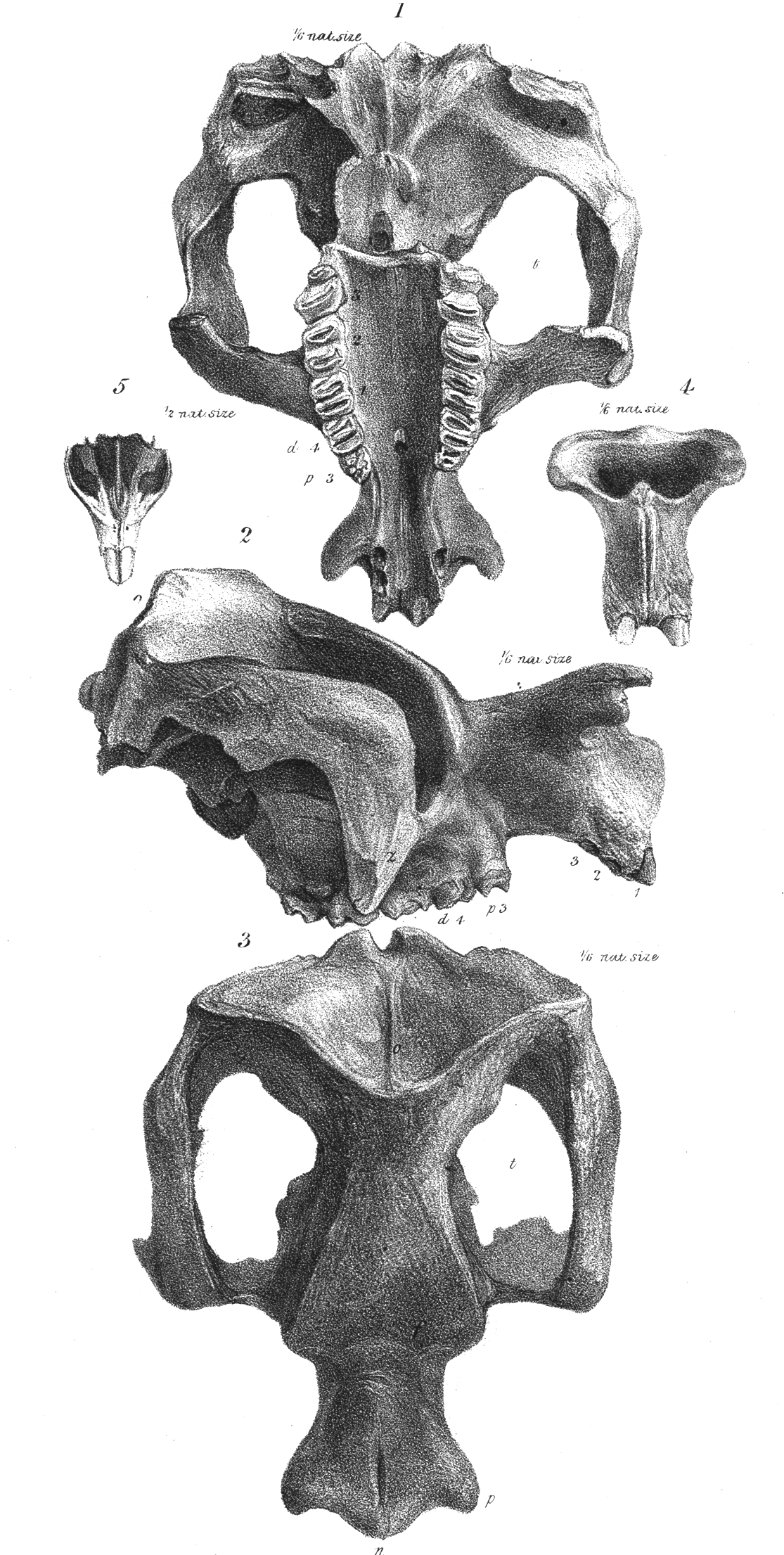
Skull of Zygomaturus in various views, from Owen 1859

== Description ==
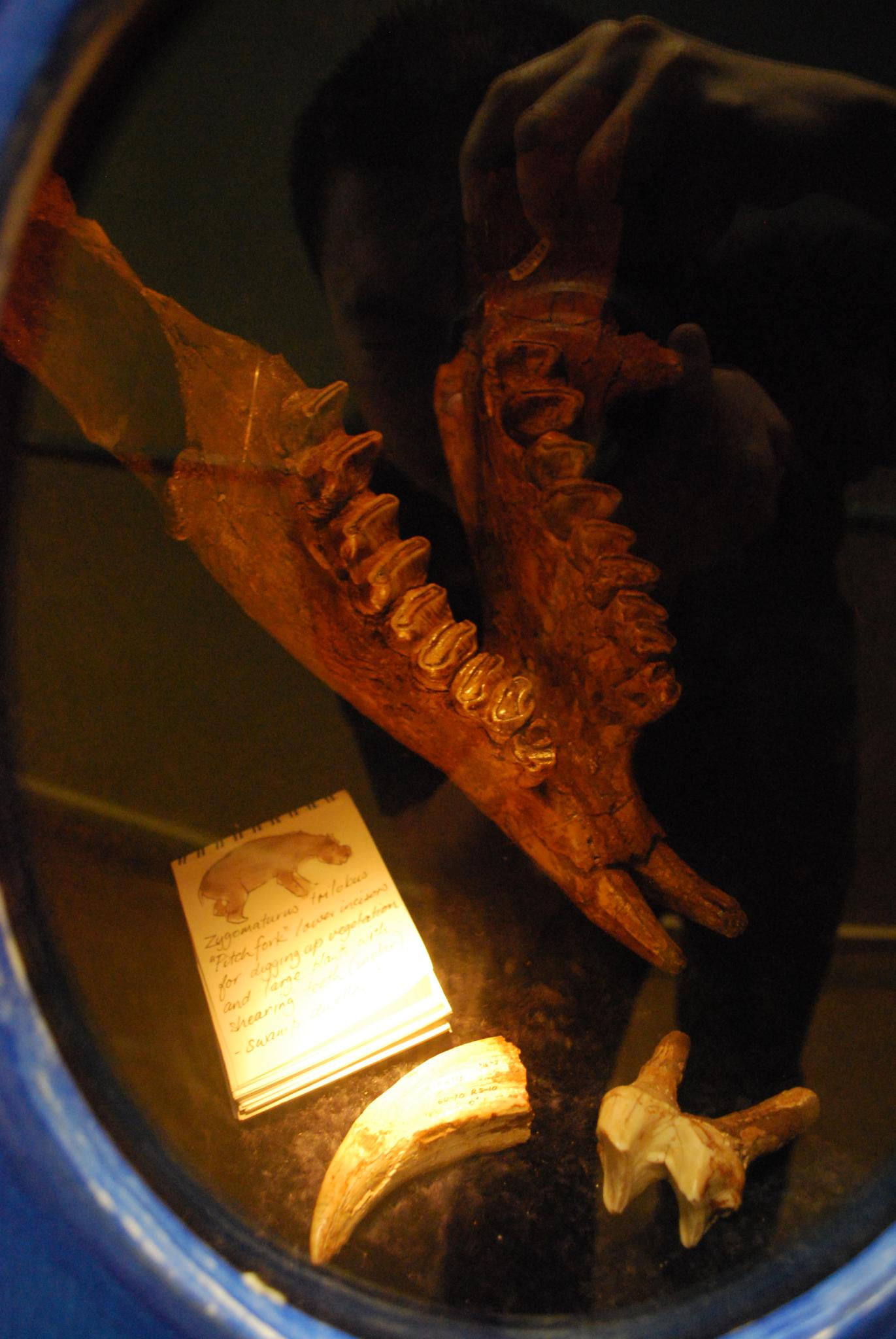
Z. trilobus jaw

It was a large animal, weighing 500 kg (1100 lbs) or over 700 kg (1544 lbs) and standing about 1.5 m (4.9 ft) tall and 2.5 m (8.2 ft) long. As in other large marsupials, the sinuses within the skull are very large, likely to reduce weight.

== Palaeobiology ==
In an analysis of remains from Cuddie Springs, the carbon isotope ratios suggests that it consumed both C_{3} and C_{4} plants, with a dental microwear texture indicative of browsing. Preserved remains suggest that Zygomaturus was widely distributed over Australia during the Pleistocene.

== Evolution and extinction ==
The earliest members of the genus such as Zygomaturus gilli appeared during the Late Miocene, around 8 million years ago. It is thought that the youngest species, Zygomaturus trilobus became extinct during the latter half of the Late Pleistocene, with typical estimates being about 45,000 years ago, around the time of Aboriginal arrival in Australia. A surprisingly late date between 33.3 ±3.7 Kya and 36.7 ±5.1 Kya was reported in 2017 from the Willandra Lakes Region in New South Wales, which if correct would represent the latest known date for any extinct Australian megafauna.

== Related genera ==
- Hulitherium
- Maokopia
- Silvabestius
- Neohelos
- Kolopsis
