= Mukupirna =

Mukupirna Temporal range: Late Oligocene

Scientific classification
- Kingdom: Animalia
- Phylum: Chordata
- Class: Mammalia
- Infraclass: Marsupialia
- Order: Diprotodontia
- Infraorder: Vombatomorphia
- Superfamily: Vombatoidea
- Family: †Mukupirnidae; Beck et al., 2020
- Genus: †Mukupirna; Beck et al., 2020

Type species
- Mukupirna nambensis Beck et al., 2020

Other species
- †M. fortidentata Crichton et al., 2023

Extinct genus of marsupials

Mukupirna is an extinct genus of marsupials whose fossils have been recovered in Australia and dated to around 25 million years ago during the Oligocene Epoch. It was wombat-like with the main difference being that it was rather huge compared to modern wombats with estimates placing it between 141 and 173 kilograms (311 and 381 lb) in body mass, comparable in size to a male Asiatic black bear. It was probably a great digger and had developed teeth that would have allowed it to feed on sedges, roots and tubers. Mukupirna nambensis had a mix of characteristics between wombats and an extinct group of marsupials called wynyardiids. M. nambensis was coined by Beck et al. (2020) and M. fortidentatus was coined by Crichton et al. (2023).
