= Ngapakaldia =

Ngapakaldia Temporal range: Late Oligocene

Scientific classification
- Kingdom: Animalia
- Phylum: Chordata
- Class: Mammalia
- Infraclass: Marsupialia
- Order: Diprotodontia
- Family: †Diprotodontidae
- Genus: †Ngapakaldia; R. A. Stirton, 1967

Species
- †N. bonythoni Stirton, 1967; †N. tedfordi Stirton, 1967

Synonyms
- †Bematherium Tedford, 1967

Extinct genus of marsupials

Ngapakaldia is an extinct genus of diprotodontid marsupials, related to the modern koala and wombat. Around the size of a sheep, it was a ground-dwelling herbivore that lived around the vegetated shores of lakes in Central Australia during the Late Oligocene.

The genus was established in 1967 by R. A. Stirton when describing a fossil species Ngapakaldia tedfordi. The name refers to the source of the type material, Lake Ngapakaldi, located in Lake Ngapakaldi to Lake Palankarinna Fossil Area in the Tirari Desert of central Australia.

Two species are placed with the genus, N. bonythoni and N. tedfordi.
