= Warendja =

Warendja Temporal range: Late Miocene—Late Pleistocene

Scientific classification
- Kingdom: Animalia
- Phylum: Chordata
- Class: Mammalia
- Infraclass: Marsupialia
- Order: Diprotodontia
- Family: Vombatidae
- Genus: †Warendja; Hope and Wilkinson, 1982

Species
- Warendja wakefieldi (Hope and Wilkinson, 1982); Warendja encorensis (Brewer et al., 2007)

Extinct genus of marsupials

Warendja is an extinct genus of wombat. It is known from two species, W. encorensis from the Late Miocene Riversleigh site in Queensland, and W. wakefieldi known from the Pleistocene of South Australia, New South Wales, and Victoria. The two species are primarily distinguished by features of their enamel. It became extinct as part of the Quaternary extinction event. Warendja wakefieldi is estimated to have weighed about 10 kg, considerably smaller than living wombats. Warendja thought to be relatively basal amongst wombats, being the most primitive member to possess hypselodont (high crowned) cheek teeth. The morphology of the humerus of W. wakefieldi suggests that it engaged in scratch-digging.
