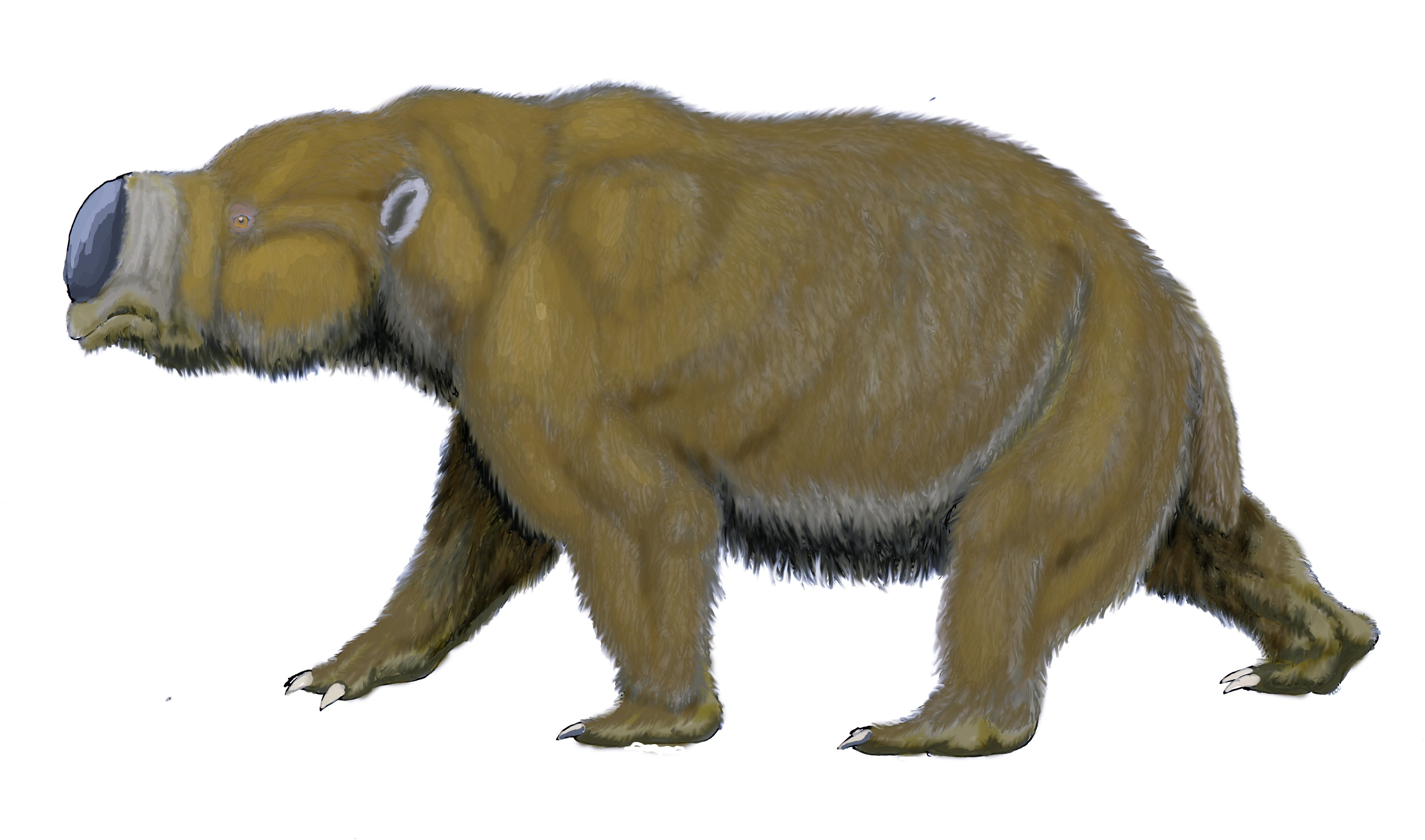
- Restoration of Diprotodon
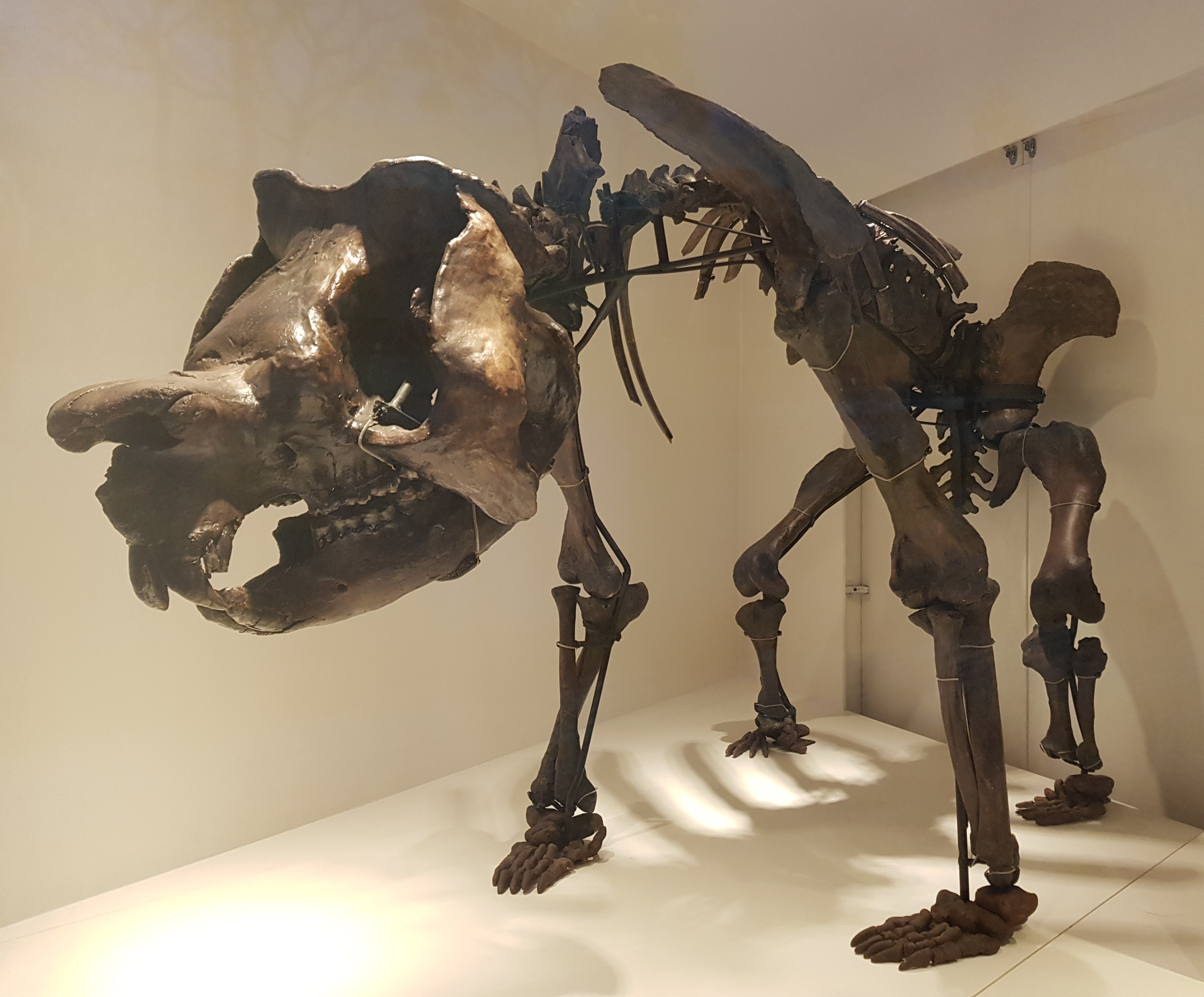
- Fossil of Zygomaturus

Scientific classification
- Kingdom: Animalia
- Phylum: Chordata
- Class: Mammalia
- Infraclass: Marsupialia
- Order: Diprotodontia
- Superfamily: †Diprotodontoidea
- Family: †Diprotodontidae; Gill, 1872

Subfamilies and genera
- See text

= Diprotodontidae =

Diprotodontidae Temporal range: Late Oligocene – Late Pleistocene

Extinct family of marsupials

Diprotodontidae, from Ancient Greek δί- (dí-), meaning "two", πρῶτος (prôtos), meaning "first", and ὀδούς (odoús), meaning "tooth", is an extinct family of large herbivorous marsupials, endemic to Australia and New Guinea during the Oligocene through Pleistocene periods from 28.4 million to 40,000 years ago.

The family primarily consisted of large quadrupedal terrestrial browsers, notably including the largest marsupial that ever lived, the rhino-sized Diprotodon. Nimbadon, which is often considered a basal diprotodontid, was arboreal. Diprotodontids were plantigrade with foot and toes flat relative to the ground.

== Morphology and ecology ==
In most diprotodontids, the forelimbs were not specialised and were capable of being used for functions other than movement. Some later diprotodontids from the Pliocene onwards like Ambulator and Diprotodon developed elephant-like forelimbs specialised for walking with modified wristbones which functioned as a heel, along with the development of footpads. Thus, the digits probably did not contact the ground, as evidenced by the lack of toes on footprints of Diprotodon. In at least some representatives of the clade, the inside of the skull was lightened by large interior sinus spaces.

At least some diprotodontids such as Diprotodon are thought to have lived in herds. At least some diprotodonts are suggested to have been sexually dimorphic with differently sized male and female morphs, with males presumed to be the larger sex.

== Evolutionary history ==
The group first appeared during the Late Oligocene, with representatives that were mostly sheep-sized, and substantially diversified beginning during the Late Miocene, reaching an apex of diversity during the Pliocene with seven genera, likely due to the increase of open forested landscapes. Van Zoelen et al. remark that as open habitats expanded, species of this sort would have needed to travel longer distances for resources, prompting diversification.

The last known members of the group including Diprotodon and Zygomaturus from mainland Australia, and Hulitherium and Maokopia from New Guinea became extinct during the Late Pleistocene around 40,000 years ago as part of the Late Pleistocene megafauna extinctions, following the arrival of humans to Australia-New Guinea.

== Taxonomy ==
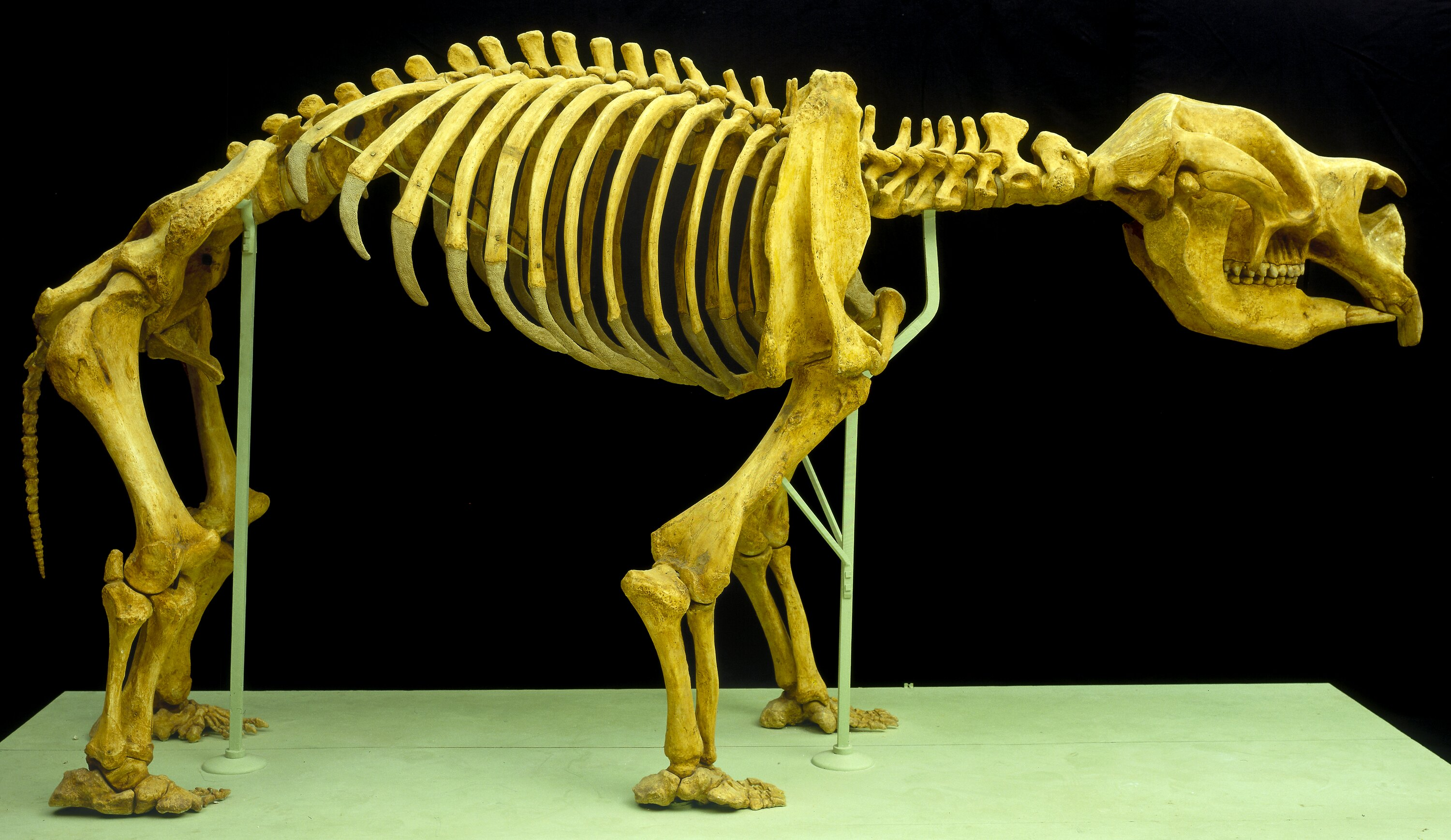
Mounted skeleton of the Diprotodon genus, Museums Victoria

Diprotodontids are members of the Vombatomorphia, meaning that their closest living relatives are wombats, though they are more closed related to Palorchestidae, with both families placed in the Diprotodontoidea. Traditionally, the family is divided into two subfamilies, Diprotodontinae and Zygomaturinae. The taxonomy of diprotodontids is in need of revision, as historically many diprotodontids were diagnosed solely on tooth morphology. The morphology of the premolar teeth of diprotodontid species is highly variable between individuals, with the molar morphology often very similar in species that differ greatly in skeletal anatomy. The taxonomic utility of morphological characters related to teeth is thus questionable.

=== List of genera ===
- Alkwertatherium
- Ambulator
- Diprotodon
- Euowenia
- Euryzygoma
- Meniscolophus
- ?Nimbadon
- Nototherium
- Pyramios
- Sthenomerus
- Zygomaturinae
  - †Hulitherium
  - †Kolopsis
  - †Kolopsoides
  - †Maokopia
  - †Neohelos
  - †Plaisiodon
  - †Raemeotherium
  - †Silvabestius
  - †Zygomaturus
