= Alkwertatherium =

Alkwertatherium Temporal range: Miocene

Scientific classification
- Domain: Eukaryota
- Kingdom: Animalia
- Phylum: Chordata
- Class: Mammalia
- Infraclass: Marsupialia
- Order: Diprotodontia
- Family: †Diprotodontidae
- Genus: †Alkwertatherium; Murray, 1990
- Species: †A. webbi

Binomial name
- †Alkwertatherium webbi Murray, 1990

Extinct genus of marsupials

Alkwertatherium is an extinct genus of marsupial of the family Diprotodontidae. Only one species has been described, Alkwertatherium webbi, from the Late Miocene of Northern Territory, Australia.
