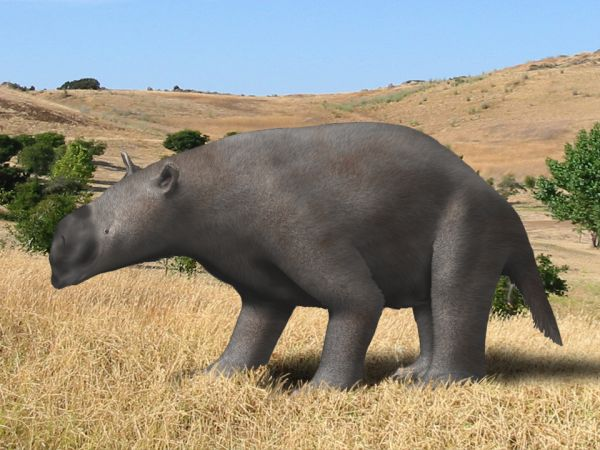

Scientific classification
- Kingdom: Animalia
- Phylum: Chordata
- Class: Mammalia
- Infraclass: Marsupialia
- Order: Diprotodontia
- Family: †Diprotodontidae
- Genus: †Pyramios; Woodburne, 1967

Type species
- †Pyramios alcootense Woodburne, 1967

= Pyramios =

Pyramios Temporal range: Late Miocene 8.5–5.5 Ma

Extinct genus of marsupials

Pyramios is an extinct genus of diprotodont from the Miocene of Australia. It was very large, reaching a length of about 2.5 m (8.2 feet) and a height of about 1.5 m (4.92 feet). Pyramios is estimated to have weighed 700 kg (1102-1543 pounds). It was comparable in size to its cousin Diprotodon, which is also in the family Diprotodontidae.
