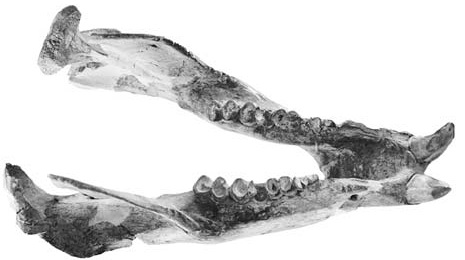
- Mandible of E. grata

Scientific classification
- Domain: Eukaryota
- Kingdom: Animalia
- Phylum: Chordata
- Class: Mammalia
- Infraclass: Marsupialia
- Order: Diprotodontia
- Family: †Diprotodontidae
- Genus: †Euowenia de Vis, 1891

Type species
- Euowenia grata de Vis, 1887

= Euowenia =

Euowenia Temporal range: Pliocene

Extinct genus of marsupials

Euowenia is an extinct genus of Diprotodontia which existed from the Pliocene to the upper Pleistocene. Weighing around 500 kg, Euowenia is only known from three locations on mainland Australia, Chinchilla in Queensland, Menindee in New South Wales and the Tirari formation on the Warburton River in the Lake Eyre basin.
