= Plaisiodon =

Plaisiodon Temporal range: Late Miocene

Scientific classification
- Domain: Eukaryota
- Kingdom: Animalia
- Phylum: Chordata
- Class: Mammalia
- Infraclass: Marsupialia
- Order: Diprotodontia
- Family: †Diprotodontidae
- Subfamily: †Zygomaturinae
- Genus: †Plaisiodon; Woodburne, 1967
- Species: †P. centralis

Binomial name
- †Plaisiodon centralis Woodburne, 1967

Extinct genus of marsupials

Plaisiodon is an extinct genus of Zygomaturinae from the late Miocene Alcoota Fossil Beds in the Northern Territory, Australia. Because of its robust skull it has been suggested that it consumed relatively hard or coarse vegetation.
