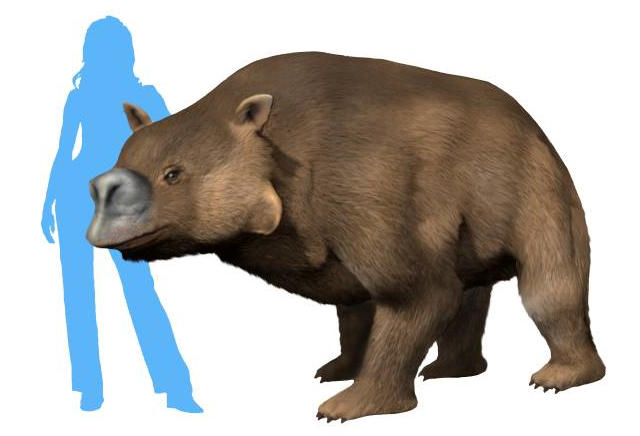
- Life reconstruction of Euryzygoma dunense

Scientific classification
- Kingdom: Animalia
- Phylum: Chordata
- Class: Mammalia
- Infraclass: Marsupialia
- Order: Diprotodontia
- Family: †Diprotodontidae
- Genus: †Euryzygoma; Longman, 1921
- Species: †E. dunense

Binomial name
- †Euryzygoma dunense De Vis, 1888

= Euryzygoma =

Euryzygoma Temporal range: Pliocene

Extinct genus of marsupials

Euryzygoma is an extinct genus of marsupial which inhabited humid eucalyptus forests in Queensland and New South Wales during the Pliocene of Australia. Euryzygoma is believed to have weighed around 500 kg, and differed from other diprotodontids in having unusual, flaring cheekbones that may have been used either for storing food or for sexual display. Euryzygoma is thought to be the ancestral genus from which Diprotodon evolved.

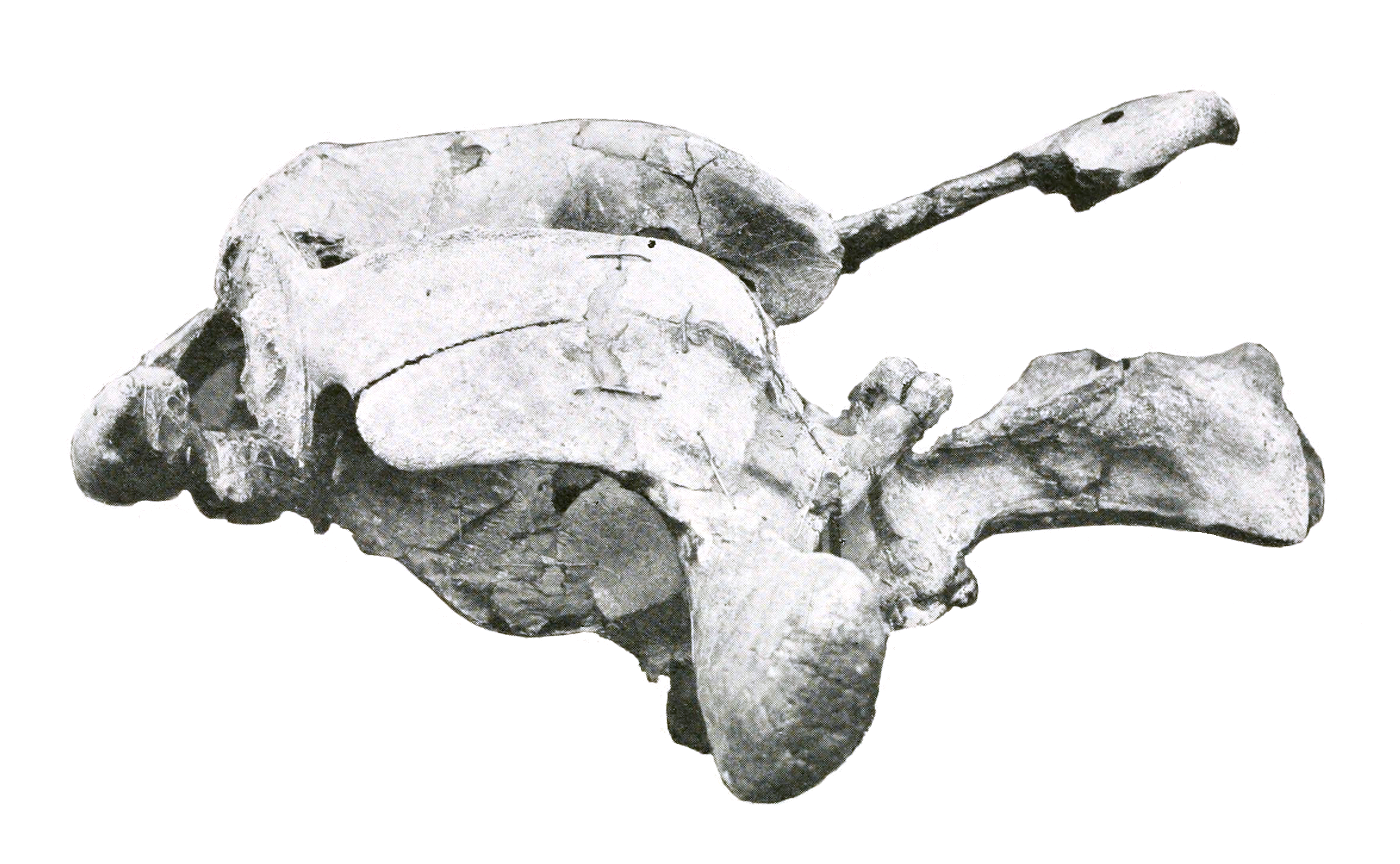
Skull in lateral view

== Palaeoecology ==
Evidence from δ^{13}C analysis of its fossils from the Chinchilla Local Fauna indicates that Euryzygoma dunense was an intermediate feeder with a significant preference for foraging on C_{3} plants.
