= Ruben A. Stirton =

American paleontologist

- Born: 20 August 1901; Kansas, US
- Died: June 14, 1966 (aged 64)

Academic background
- Education: University of Kansas

Academic work
- Discipline: paleontology
- Sub-discipline: mammalogy
- Institutions: University of California Museum of Paleontology

Ruben Arthur Stirton (1901-1966), known to his friends as "Stirt", was an American paleontologist, specializing in mammals, who was active in South America, the United States and Australia. Stirton was closely associated with the University of California Museum of Paleontology, receiving an appointment as curator in 1930 and as its fourth director from 1949 to 1966. His career also saw engaged as a lecturer, associate professorship and then as a professor in 1951, from which time he was director of the University's Department of Paleontology.

Stirton was born in Kansas on 20 August 1901, and graduated from the state's university in the field of zoology. He served as the mammalogist on expeditions led by Donald R. Dickey to El Salvador in the 1920s. His expeditions included a return to El Salvador in the 1940s, as well as another collecting fossils in Colombia. In 1953, he directed his studies to the marsupials of Australia, with the intent of discovering primitive species of marsupials.

His publications mainly dealt with fossilized mammals from the Great Plains, particularly beavers and horses. Other contributions he made included careful and systematic descriptions of fossil specimens including an accurate determination of their geological origin, the use of animal groups to perform stratigraphic correlation, and various studies on evolutionary changes in several families of mammals. Stirton was the leading author of papers that described new taxa, including the Vombatiformes genera Rhizophascolonus and Litokoala, which were published posthumously in 1967.

He died on June 14, 1966, of a heart attack, while attending a meeting of the American Society of Mammalogists in southern California. Stirton's students recall him as a popular lively lecturer, noting his rendition of the call of the Australian dingo as an example of his enthusiasm. In 1979, fellow paleontologist Patricia Vickers-Rich named the prehistoric species Dromornis stirtoni (colloquially known as Stirton's thunderbird) after this researcher, which is possibly the largest bird ever.
