= Karen H. Black =

Palaeontologist

Karen Black
- Born: 1970 (age 55–56)
- Occupation: Scientist
- Employer: University of New South Wales
- Known for: Paleontology

Karen H. Black (born c. 1970), is an Australian palaeontologist at the University of New South Wales. Black is the leading author on research describing new families, genera and species of fossil mammals. She is interested in understanding faunal change and community structure in order to gain new understandings of past, current and future changes in biodiversity which are driven by climate.

Karen Black won the Dorothy Hill medal, from the Australian Academy of Science in 2012, for research on the genus Nimbadon, and is recognised by fellow researchers in the specific epithet of Hypsiprymnodon karenblackae.

== Career ==
Black's early career involved extracting, curating and analysing the fossils of the vertebrate faunas within limestone deposits in the region of the Riversleigh World Heritage Area, located in northwestern Queensland. Black's research is focussed on improving our understanding of species interactions, development, faunal change, as well as behaviour, and community structure in ecosystems within Australia. The aim is to provide better understanding about our climate-driven changes in biodiversity.

Black was involved in the naming of a new species of extinct koala, which lived in canopies of northern Australian rainforest, approximately 20 million years ago. The koala was small, and a well-preserved skull of the new species was discovered. The koala species was named after the adventurer, Dick Smith. The species was named Litokoala dicksmithi, and Black reported “We chose the name to thank Mr Smith for his long-term financial support of Australian science, in particular, of fossil research at the Riversleigh World Heritage Area in north western Queensland.” The new species was described within the Journal of Systematic Palaeontology.

Her Dorothy Hill Medal was awarded for mammalogy research across the continent, describing the evolution of Australia's mammals, and relating changes across time with planetary-wide palaeoclimatic events, with the goal of providing new evidence-based understanding regarding projected future climate-driven changes within the biodiversity.

Black has worked at Riversleigh, with fossil discovery, and published her findings on a new, extinct species of koala, as well as other species including marsupial moles, possums, wombat-like diprotodontids as well as trunked palorchestids.

Black was described in the book "Rebels, Scholars, Explorers: Women in Vertebrate Paleontology" which describes her work in fossil-rich Riversleigh, with interests lying in biocorrelation and ontogeny.

== Publications ==
Select publications from Black's work on mammals and paleobiogeography can be found at her Google Scholar page, and a selection are listed here:

- The rise of Australian marsupials: a synopsis of biostratigraphic, phylogenetic, palaeoecologic and palaeobiogeographic understanding (2012) KH Black, M Archer, SJ Hand, H Godthelp Earth and life, 983-1078
- The evolutionary history and diversity of Australian mammals (1999) M Archer, R Arena, M Bassarova, K Black, J Brammall, B Cooke, et al. Australian Mammalogy 21 (1), 1-45
- Diversity and biostratigraphy of the Diprotodontoidea of Riversleigh, northwestern Queensland (1999) K Black MEMOIRS-QUEENSLAND MUSEUM 41, 187-192

== Awards ==
- 2012 – Dorothy Hill award

== Media ==
Black has written in the media on fossils, and bones of giant wombats, for SBS as well as for the ABC. Her work on fossil discovery has also been published in other media.
