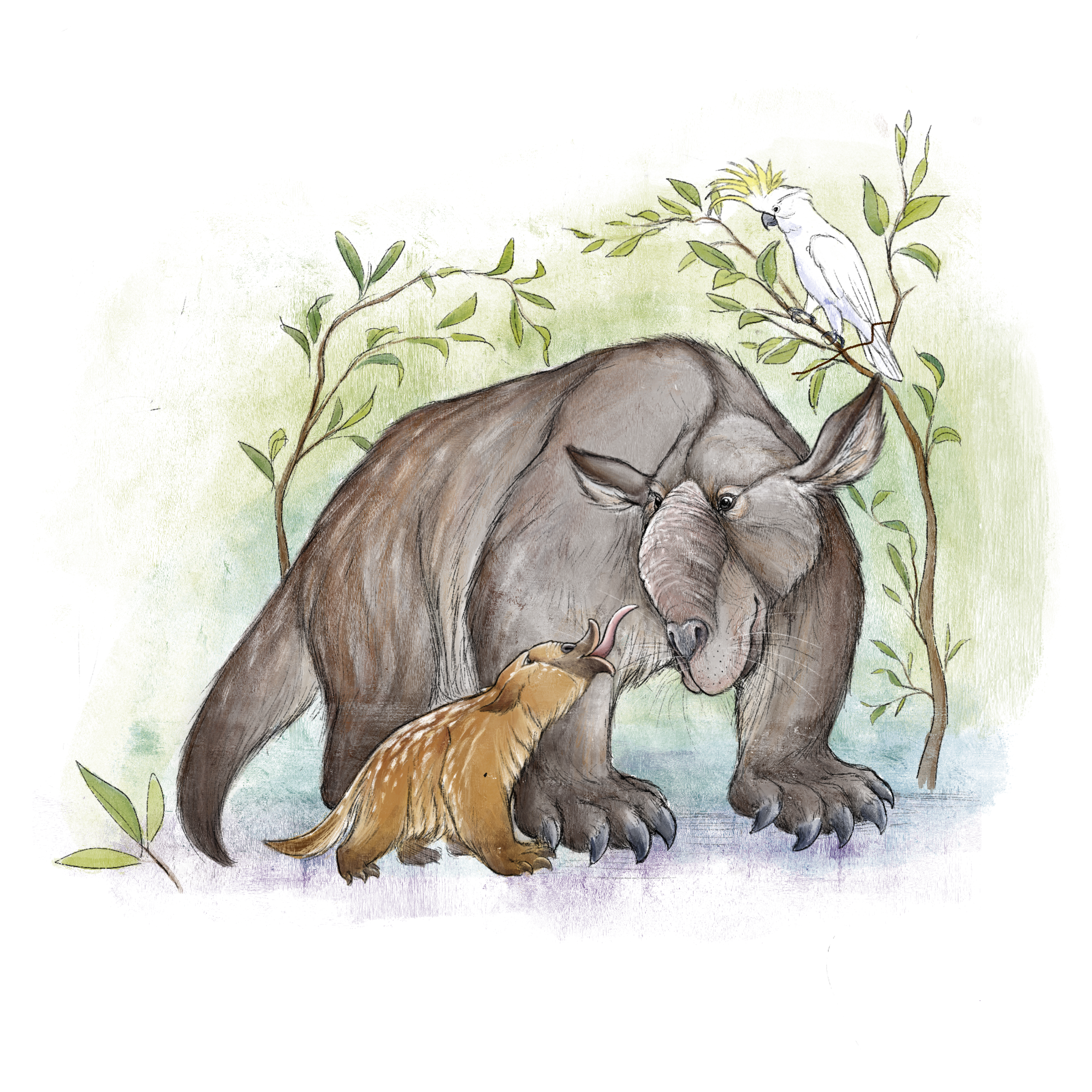
- Palorchestes azael
- Skull of Propalorchestes

Scientific classification
- Kingdom: Animalia
- Phylum: Chordata
- Class: Mammalia
- Infraclass: Marsupialia
- Order: Diprotodontia
- Superfamily: †Diprotodontoidea
- Family: †Palorchestidae; Tate, 1948

Genera
- See text

= Palorchestidae =

Palorchestidae Temporal range: Late Oligocene–Late Pleistocene

Extinct family of marsupials

Skull of Palorchestes

Palorchestidae is an extinct family of vombatiform marsupials whose members are sometimes referred to as marsupial tapirs due to the retracted nasal region of their skulls causing them to superficially resemble those of true tapirs. The idea that they had a tapir-like trunk has been contested, with other authors contending that it is more likely that they had a prehensile lip and protrusible tongue instead. While earlier representatives like Propalorchestes had relatively unspecialised forelimbs, the last member of the family, Palorchestes developed unusual clawed forelimbs with a morphology unlike that of any living animal, which were likely used to tear vegetation. They are suggested to have been browsers. The group experienced an increase in body size over time, with Propalorchestes weighing around 150 kilograms (330 lb), while the last known species, Palorchestes azael may have exceeded a ton. They are considered to be members of Diprotodontoidea, most closely related to the also extinct Diprotodontidae. Their closest living relatives are wombats.

== Genera ==
The family consists of the following two genera:

- Propalorchestes (Murray, 1986) (Oligocene-Miocene)
- Palorchestes (Owen, 1873) (Pliocene-Late Pleistocene)
