= Kolopsoides =

Kolopsoides Temporal range: Pliocene

Scientific classification
- Kingdom: Animalia
- Phylum: Chordata
- Class: Mammalia
- Infraclass: Marsupialia
- Order: Diprotodontia
- Family: †Diprotodontidae
- Subfamily: †Zygomaturinae
- Genus: †Kolopsoides; Plane, 1967
- Species: †K. cultridens

Binomial name
- †Kolopsoides cultridens Plane, 1967

Extinct genus of marsupials

Kolopsoides is an extinct genus of Zygomaturinae marsupial from the Otibanda Formation, Pliocene of Watut River, Papua New Guinea.
