= Maokopia =

Maokopia Temporal range: Late Pleistocene

Scientific classification
- Domain: Eukaryota
- Kingdom: Animalia
- Phylum: Chordata
- Class: Mammalia
- Infraclass: Marsupialia
- Order: Diprotodontia
- Family: †Diprotodontidae
- Subfamily: †Zygomaturinae
- Genus: †Maokopia; Flannery, 1992
- Species: †M. ronaldi

Binomial name
- †Maokopia ronaldi Flannery, 1992

Extinct genus of marsupials

Maokopia is an extinct genus of Zygomaturinae from the Late Pleistocene of Irian Jaya, New Guinea. It is known from a partial skull and was a comparatively small species of diprotodontid, weighing 100 kg. Murray (1992) suggested that it was most closely related to Hulitherium. The teeth indicate a diet of hard ferns and grasses that still grow in the alpine meadows of the area (Long et al., 2002).
