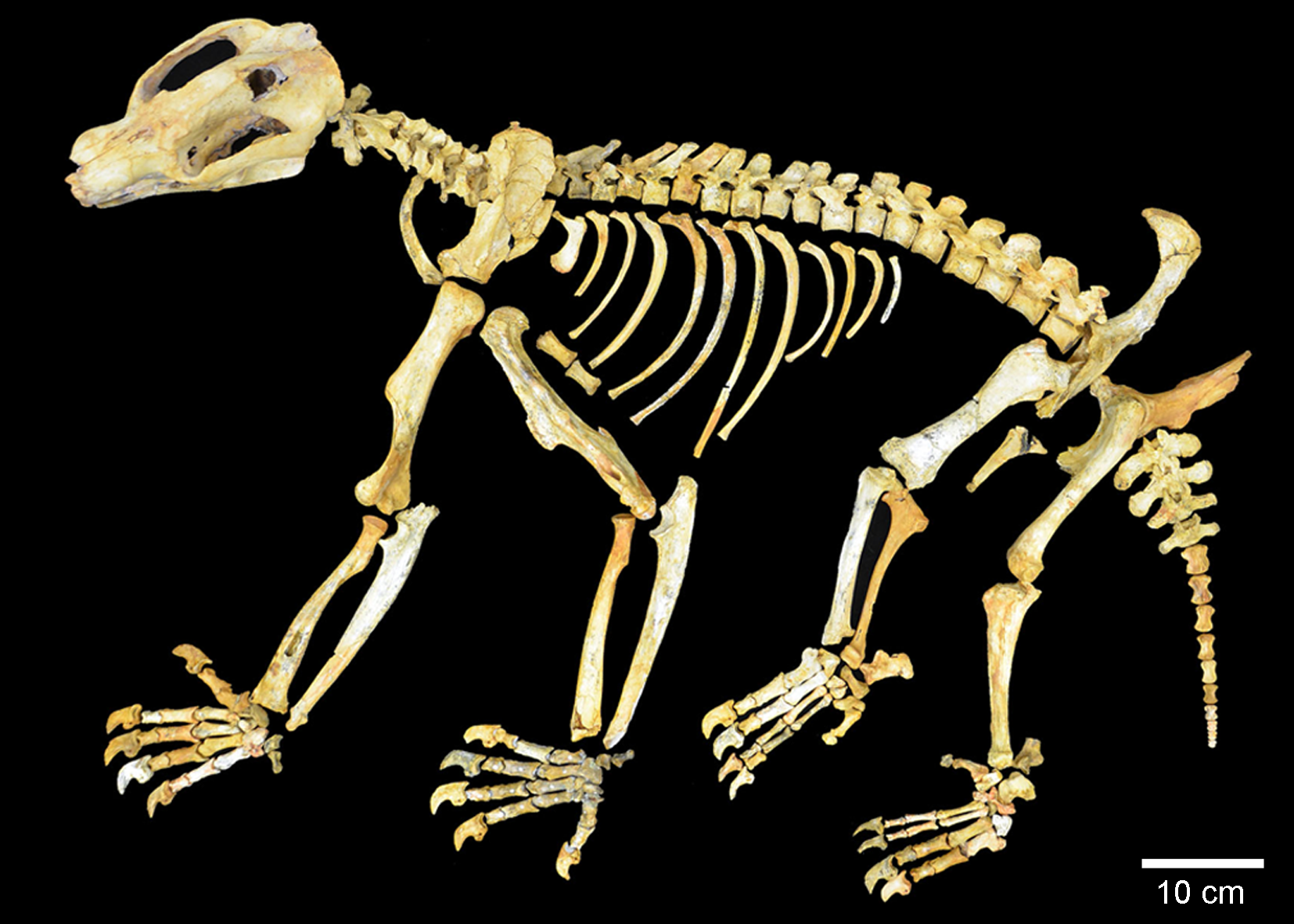
- Composite N. lavarackorum skeleton from the Riversleigh site
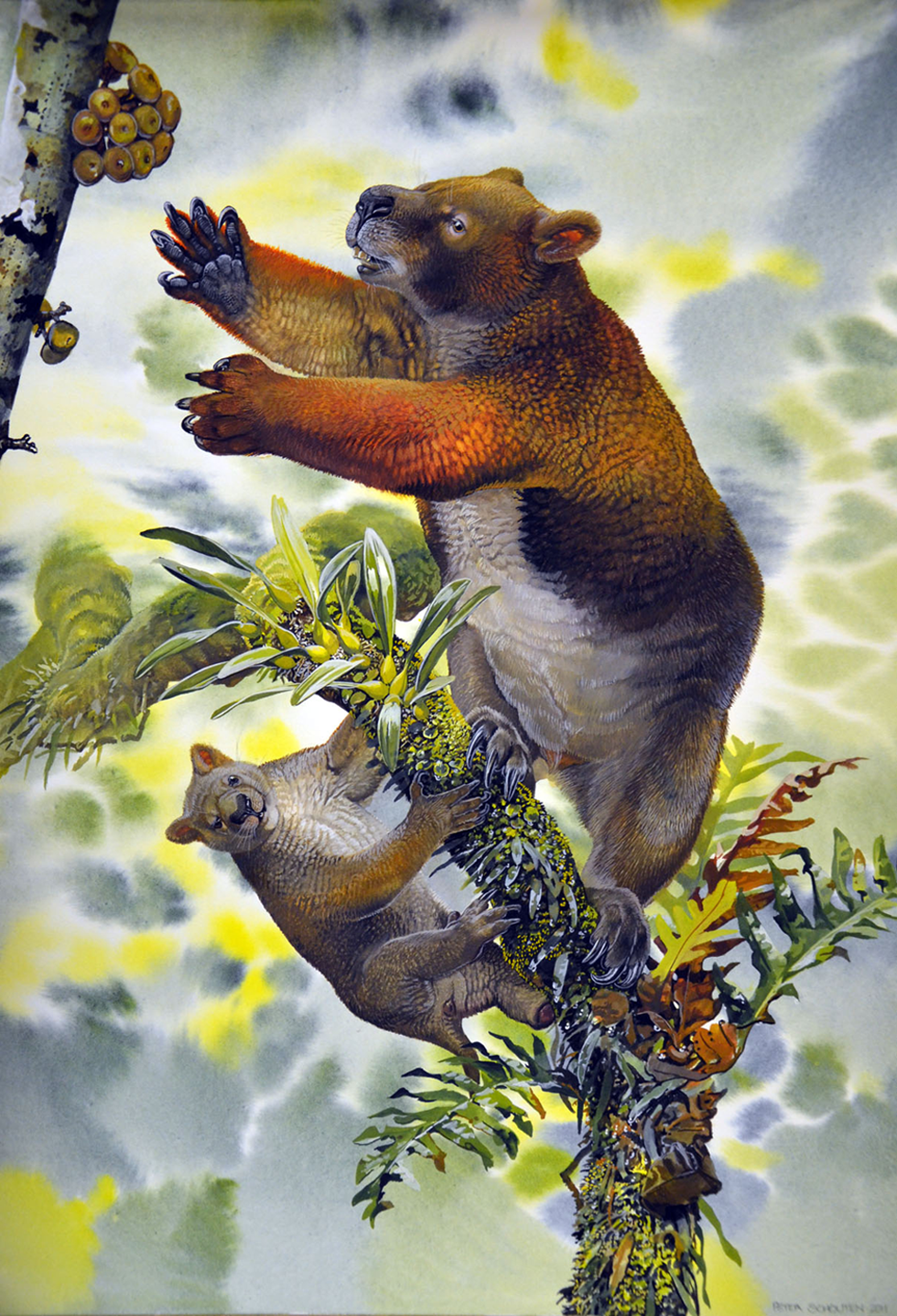
- N. lavarackorum mother and juvenile (reconstruction) by Peter Schouten

Scientific classification
- Kingdom: Animalia
- Phylum: Chordata
- Class: Mammalia
- Infraclass: Marsupialia
- Order: Diprotodontia
- Superfamily: †Diprotodontoidea
- Genus: †Nimbadon; Hand, Archer, Godthelp, Rich & Pledge, 1993.

Species
- †Nimbadon lavarackorum †Nimbadon scottorrorum †Nimbadon whitelawi

= Nimbadon =

Nimbadon Temporal range: 25–12 Ma

Extinct genus of marsupials

Nimbadon is an extinct genus of marsupial, that lived from the Oligocene to the Miocene. Many fossils have been found in the Riversleigh World Heritage property in north-western Queensland, Australia. It is thought to have an arboreal lifestyle.

In 1990, skulls were unearthed in a previously unknown cave in the region. Researchers estimate that the first species of Nimbadon first appeared around 25 million years ago and went extinct around 12 million years ago, perhaps from climate change-induced habitat loss.

== Description ==
Nimbadon lavarackorum is described as being koala-like. It is known from at least 24 well-articulated specimens. The species was a tree-dweller, mainly feeding on stems and leaves. The feet and claws were large, being superficially similar to those of the koala.

== Phylogeny ==
While originally classified as a member of the family Diprotodontidae, a primarily terrestrial group, some later studies suggested a more basal position within the Diprotodontoidea.

== Palaeoecology ==
N. lavarackorum was an arboreal frugivore that primarily fed on C_{3} fruits.
