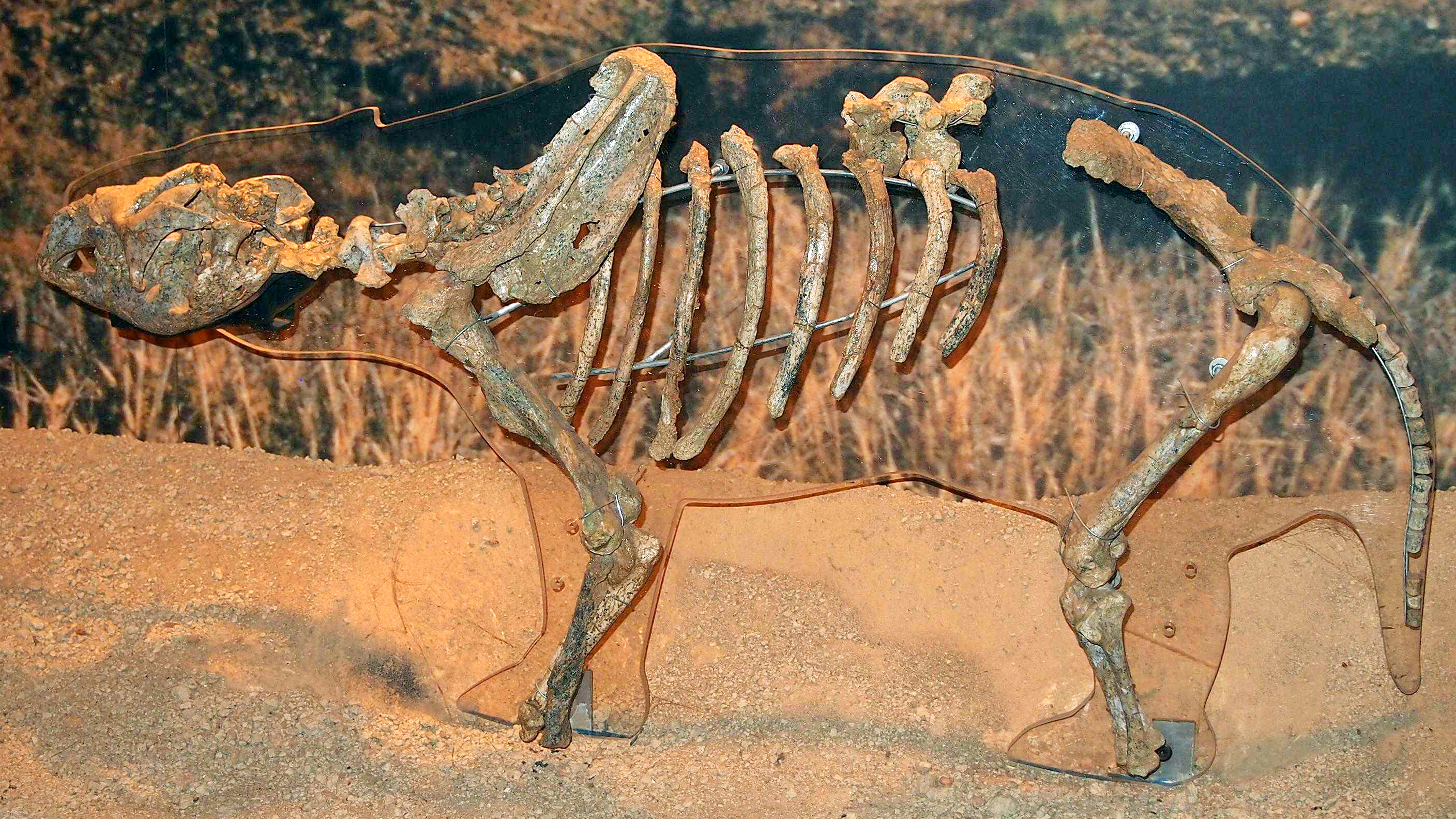

Scientific classification
- Kingdom: Animalia
- Phylum: Chordata
- Class: Mammalia
- Infraclass: Marsupialia
- Order: Diprotodontia
- Family: †Diprotodontidae
- Subfamily: †Zygomaturinae
- Genus: †Kolopsis; Woodburne, 1967

Type species
- Kolopsis torus Woodburne, 1967

Species
- See text.

= Kolopsis =

Kolopsis Temporal range: Late Miocene to Pliocene

Extinct genus of marsupials

Kolopsis is an extinct genus of diprotodontid marsupials from Australia and Papua New Guinea. It contains three species, although K. rotundus may be more closely related to other zygomaturines than to Kolopsis.

- †Kolopsis rotundus Plane 1967 (Pliocene, Watut River, Papua New Guinea)
- †Kolopsis torus Woodburne, 1967 (Miocene, Alcoota, Northern Territory, Australia)
- †Kolopsis yperus Murray, Megirian & Wells, 1993 (Miocene, Alcoota, Northern Territory, Australia)
