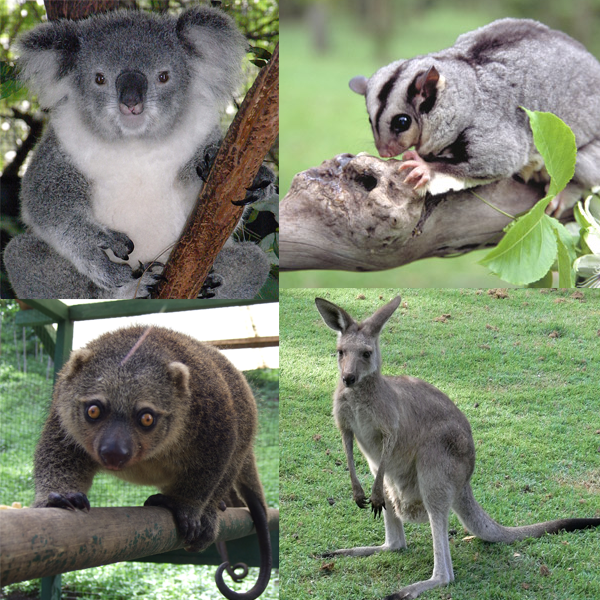
- Clockwise from upper left: female koala (Phascolarctos cinereus), mahogany glider (Petaurus gracilis), young eastern grey kangaroo (Macropus giganteus) and Sulawesi bear cuscus (Ailurops ursinus)

Scientific classification
- Kingdom: Animalia
- Phylum: Chordata
- Class: Mammalia
- Infraclass: Marsupialia
- Clade: Eomarsupialia
- Order: Diprotodontia; Owen, 1866

Suborders
- Vombatiformes; Phalangeriformes; Macropodiformes

= Diprotodontia =

Diprotodontia Temporal range: 28–0 Ma Late Oligocene – Recent

Order of marsupial mammals

Diprotodontia (/daɪˌproʊtəˈdɒntiə/) is the largest extant order of marsupials, with about 155 species, including the kangaroos, wallabies, possums, koala, wombats, and many others. Extinct diprotodonts include the hippopotamus-sized Diprotodon, and Thylacoleo, the so-called "marsupial lion".

== Characteristics ==
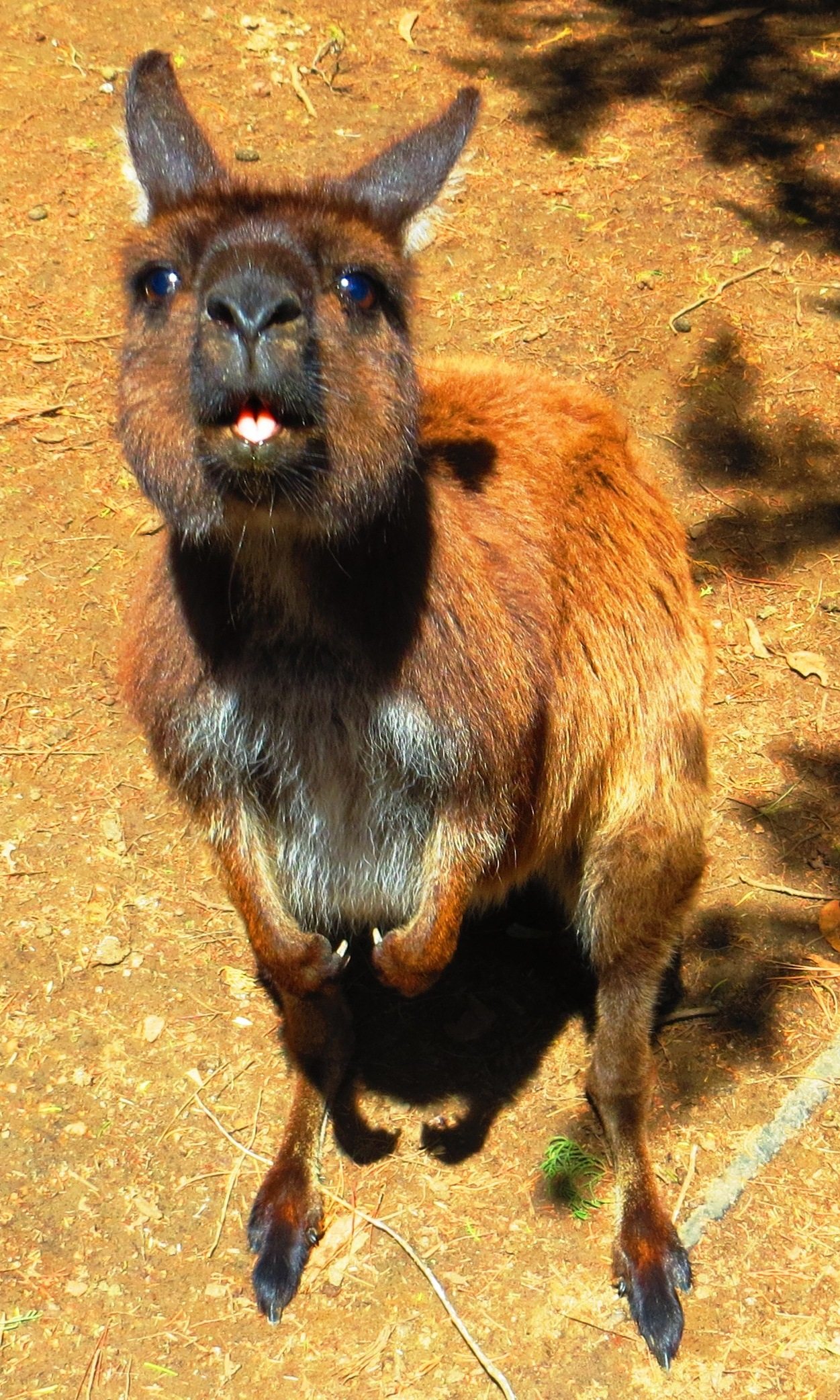
The prominent mandibular central incisors characteristic of the diprotodonts are evident in this Kangaroo Island western grey kangaroo (Macropus fuliginosus fuliginosus)

Living diprotodonts are almost all herbivores, as were most of those that are now extinct. A few insectivorous and omnivorous diprotodonts are known, and the Potoroidae are almost unique among vertebrates in being largely fungivorous, but these seem to have arisen as relatively recent adaptations from the mainstream herbivorous lifestyle. The extinct thylacoleonids ("marsupial lions") are the only known group to have exhibited carnivory on a large scale.

Diprotodonts are restricted to Australasia. The earliest known fossils date to the late Oligocene, but their genesis certainly lies earlier than this, as large gaps occur in Australia's fossil record, with virtually no fossil record at all in geologically active New Guinea. The great diversity of known Oligocene diprotodonts suggests the order began to diverge well beforehand.

Many of the largest and least athletic diprotodonts (along with a wide range of other Australian megafauna) became extinct when humans first arrived in Australia about 50,000 years ago. Their extinction possibly occurred as a direct result of hunting, but was more probably a result of widespread habitat changes brought about by human activities—notably the use of fire.

Two key anatomical features, in combination, identify Diprotodontia. Members of the order are, first, "diprotodont" (meaning "two front teeth"), from the Ancient Greek δί- (dí-), πρῶτος (prôtos), and ὀδούς (odoús). Specifically, they have a pair of large, procumbent incisors on the lower jaw, a common feature of many early groups of mammals and mammaliforms. The diprotodont jaw is short, usually with three pairs of upper incisors (wombats, like rodents have only one pair), and no lower canines. The second trait distinguishing diprotodonts is "syndactyly", a fusing of the second and third digits of the foot up to the base of the claws, which leaves the claws themselves separate. Digit five is usually absent, and digit four is often greatly enlarged.

Syndactyly is not particularly common (though the Australian omnivorous marsupials share it) and is generally posited as an adaptation to assist in climbing. Many modern diprotodonts, however, are strictly terrestrial, and have evolved further adaptations to their feet to better suit this lifestyle. This makes the history of the tree-kangaroos particularly convoluted: it appears that the animals were arboreal at some time in the far distant past, moving afterward to the ground—gaining long kangaroo-like feet in the process — before returning to the trees, where they further developed a shortening and broadening of the hind feet and a novel climbing method.

== Fossil record ==
The earliest known fossil of Diprotodontia dates back to the Late Oligocene (23.03 - 28.4 million years ago).

== Classification ==
Until recently, only two suborders in Diprotodontia were noted: Vombatiformes which encompassed the wombats and koala and Phalangerida which contained all other families. Kirsch et al. (1997) split the families into three suborders. In addition, the six Phalangeriformes families are split into two superfamilies. The Macropodiformes are probably nested within the Phalangeriformes, though whether they are sister to Phalangeroidea or Petauroidea is debated.

Cladogram of Diprotodontia by Upham et al. 2019 and Álvarez-Carretero et al. 2022

- Diprotodontia
  - Vombatiformes
    - Phascolarctimorphia
      Phascolarctidae
    - Vombatomorphia
      Vombatidae
  - Phalangerida
    - Phalangeriformes s.s.
      - Burramyidae
      - Phalangeridae
    - Macropodiformes s.l.
      - Petauroidea
        - Acrobatidae
        - - Tarsipedidae
          - - Petauridae
            - Pseudocheiridae
      - Macropodoidea
        - Hypsiprymnodontidae
        - - Potoroidae
          - Macropodidae

Order Diprotodontia

- Suborder Macropodiformes
  - Family Hypsiprymnodontidae: (musky rat-kangaroo)
  - Family Macropodidae: (kangaroos, wallabies and allies)
  - Family Potoroidae: (bettongs, potoroos, and rat-kangaroos)
  - Family †Balbaridae: (basal quadrupedal kangaroos)
- Suborder Phalangeriformes
  - Superfamily Petauroidea
    - Family Acrobatidae: (feathertail glider and feather-tailed possum)
    - Family Petauridae: (striped possum, Leadbeater's possum, yellow-bellied glider, sugar glider, mahogany glider, squirrel glider)
    - Family Pseudocheiridae: (ring-tailed possums and allies)
    - Family Tarsipedidae: (honey possum)
  - Superfamily Phalangeroidea
    - Family Burramyidae: (pygmy possums)
    - Family Phalangeridae: (brushtail possums and cuscuses)
    - Family †Ektopodontidae: (sprite possums)
- Suborder Vombatiformes
  - Family Phascolarctidae: koala (one species)
  - Family Vombatidae: wombats (three species)
  - Family †Diprotodontidae: (giant wombats)
  - Family †Ilariidae
  - Family †Maradidae
  - Family †Palorchestidae: (marsupial tapirs)
  - Family †Thylacoleonidae: (marsupial lions)
  - Family †Wynyardiidae

† means extinct family, genus or species

== See also ==
- List of mammal genera
- List of recently extinct mammals
- List of prehistoric mammals
