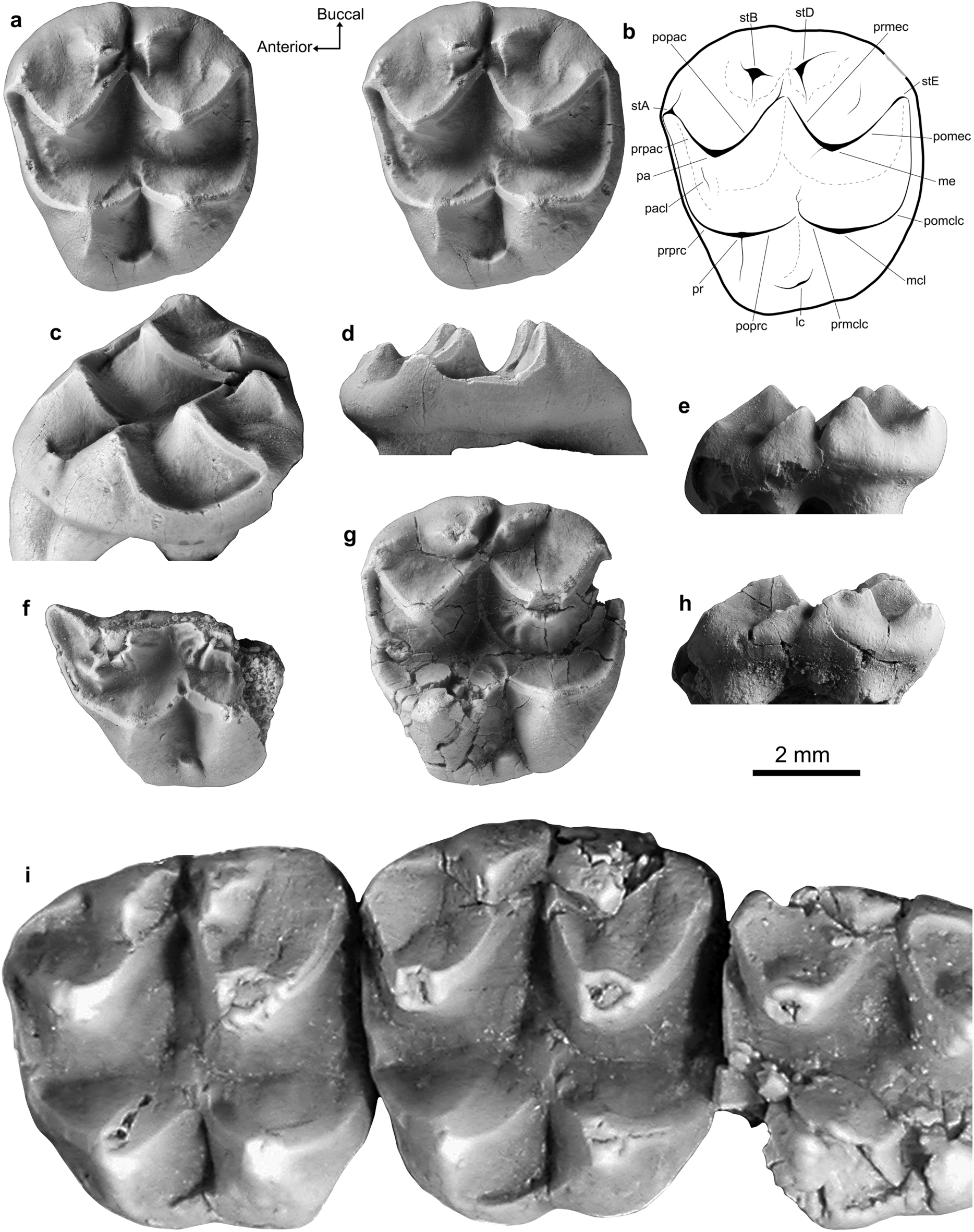
- Holotype (a-e) and paratype (f-h) specimens of Lumakoala blackae

Scientific classification
- Kingdom: Animalia
- Phylum: Chordata
- Class: Mammalia
- Infraclass: Marsupialia
- Order: Diprotodontia
- Family: Phascolarctidae (?)
- Genus: †Lumakoala; Crichton et al., 2023
- Species: †L. blackae

Binomial name
- †Lumakoala blackae Crichton et al., 2023

= Lumakoala =

Lumakoala Temporal range: Late Oligocene

Extinct genus of phascolarctid

Lumakoala is an extinct genus of probable phascolarctid that inhabited the Northern Territory of Australia during the Late Oligocene. It was a member of the Pwerte Marnte Marnte Local Fauna and lived alongside two other koala species. It likely fed on soft plants and, occasionally, insects. The genus contains only a single species, Lumakoala blackae, known from a few isolated teeth.

== Discovery and naming ==
The fossils of Lumakoala were unearthed sometime in 2014 or 2020 during an expedition to the Pwerte Marnte Marnte fossil site in the Northern Territory. The holotype (NTM P12012) is a left upper second or third molar. The paratypes are: NTM P12013, an upper second or third molar; and NTM P12014, a portion of an upper first molar.

In 2023, Crichton and colleagues named and described Lumakoala blackae as a new genus and species of probable phascolarctid based on these remains. The genus name is derived from the Latin word for "thorn" (Luma), a word specifically chosen to reference the distinctive stylar cusps of the teeth. The species name was chosen to honour Karen Black, who has greatly improved our understanding of fossil phascolarctids and other vombatiforms.

== Description ==
The upper molars of Lumakoala retain the primitive metatherian condition of being bunoselenodont (bunodont plus selenodont). In occlusal view, the molars have a rounded outline. Each molar has four main cusps, with the two front cusps representing the paracone and protocone, and the back two representing the metacone and metaconule. Two additional cusps, identified as stylar cusps, are present beside the crests running in front of the metacone (premetacrista) and away from the paracone (postparacrista). Similar to Priscakoala, these stylar cusps are cone-shaped. The postparacrista continues past the point where it meets the premetacrista towards one of the stylar cusps. The premetacrista and postparacrista join mid-width between the buccal (cheek) margin of the tooth and the highest points of the paracone and metacone as a result of a wider stylar shelf.

With an estimated body weight of 2.2 to 2.6 kg (4.9 to 5.7 lbs), Lumakoala was one of the smallest phascolarctids.

== Classification ==
The phylogenetic analyses conducted for Lumakoala were based on a modified dataset that was built on that of Beck et al. (2020). Originally, it contained 46 taxa but 13 additional taxa were included in the study. In the unconstrained Bayesian analysis, Lumakoala was found to be a stem vombatiform, sister taxon to a group containing Phascolarctidae and Vombatomorphia. However, under maximum parsimony, it formed a polytomy with Cercartetus lepidus, Thylacoleonidae, and the aforementioned group containing Phascolarctidae and Vombatomorphia.

- Diprotodontia
  - †Thylacoleonidae
  - - Cercartetus lepidus
    - Vombatiformes
      - †Lumakoala blackae
      - - Vombatomorphia
        - Phascolarctidae
          - †Priscakoala lucyturnbullae
          - - - †Madakoala spp.
              - †Perikoala robustus
            - - †Invictokoala monticola
              - - †Koobor notabilis
                - - †Litokoala dicksmithi
                  - - †Nimiokoala greystanesi
                    - - †Litokoala kutjamarpensis
                      - - †Stelakoala riversleighensis
                        - Phascolarctos cinereus

Despite these results, the authors considered Lumakoala to be a probable phascolarctid by constraining it into a clade with phascolarctids. The results from the most parsimonious (i.e. shortest) phylogenetic trees found it in a polytomy with Priscakoala lucyturnbullae, and a clade made up of the remaining phascolarctids.

- Diprotodontia
  - Cercartetus lepidus
  - †Thylacoleonidae
  - Vombatiformes
    - Vombatomorphia
    - Phascolarctidae
      - †Lumakoala blackae
      - †Priscakoala lucyturnbullae
      - - - †Madakoala spp.
          - †Perikoala robustus
        - - †Invictokoala monticola
          - - †Koobor notabilis
            - - †Nimiokoala greystanesi
              - †Litokoala dicksmithi
              - - †Litokoala kutjamarpensis
                - - †Stelakoala riversleighensis
                  - Phascolarctos cinereus

== Palaeoecology ==
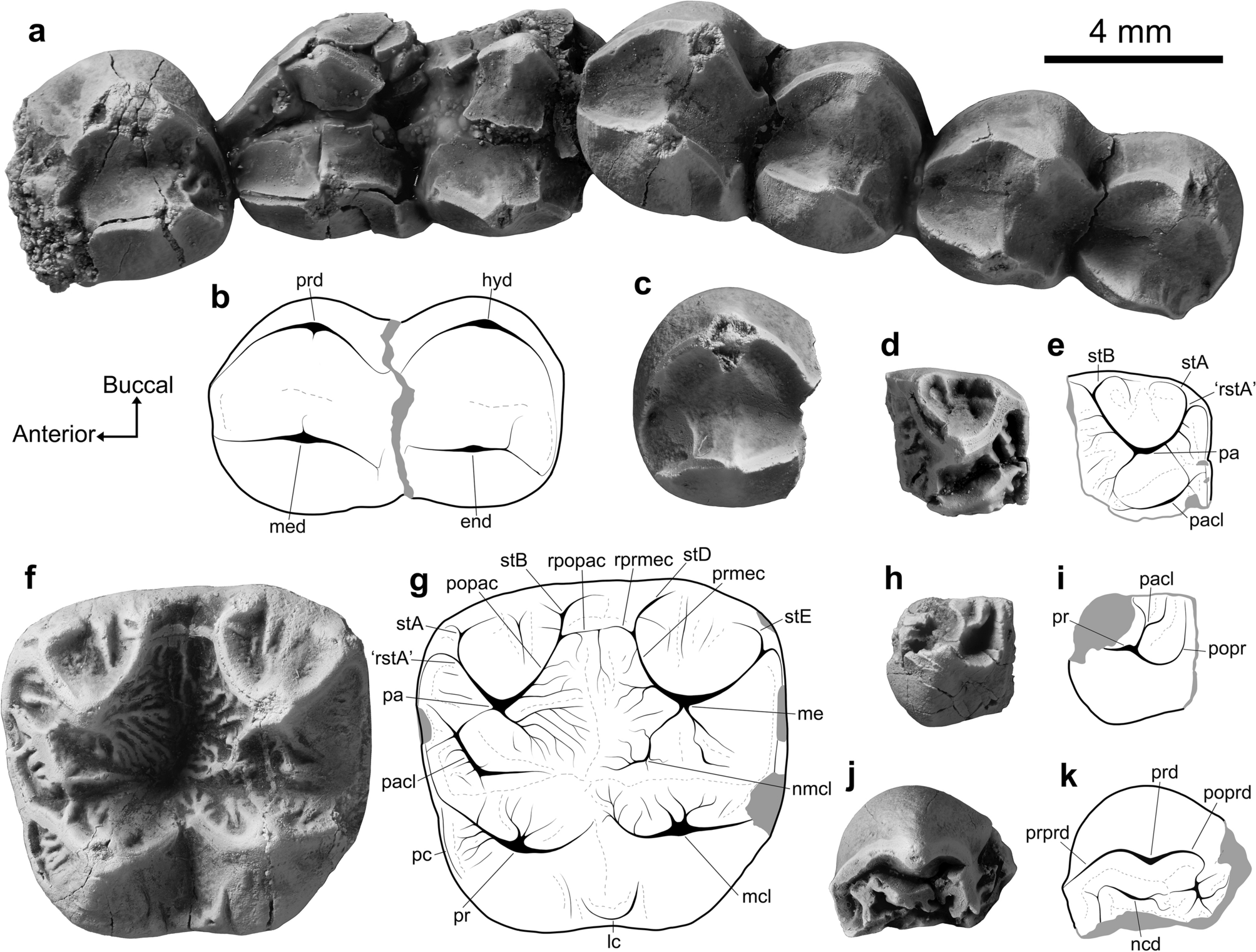
Fossils of Madakoala (a-g) and Nimiokoala (h-k) from the Pwerte Martne Marnte LF.

Lumakoala is known from the Late Oligocene Pwerte Marnte Marnte Local Fauna of an unnamed formation in the Northern Territory. At least two other phascolarctids have been recovered from the site, namely Madakoala and Nimiokoala. The discovery of numerous koala species suggests the presence of high plant diversity in a wooded environment. Other animals represented at the locality include the crocodile Baru wickeni, two forms of dromornithids, an unnamed thylacinid, an unnamed perameloid, the vombatiform Mukupirna fortidentata, an indeterminate diprotodontid, a wynyardiid (possibly Muramura williamsi), an unnamed ilariid, indeterminate phalangerid and pseudocheirid possums, and an indeterminate potoroid.

The teeth of Lumakoala were characterised by their relatively undeveloped enamel crenulations and their diminutive crown height, suggesting that it fed primarily on a diet of soft plants. It is hypothesised that it occasionally opportunistically engaged in insectivory like extant members of Phalangeriformes do.
