= Phascolarctos sulcomaxilliaris =

Scientific classification
- Kingdom: Animalia
- Phylum: Chordata
- Class: Mammalia
- Infraclass: Marsupialia
- Order: Diprotodontia
- Family: Phascolarctidae
- Genus: Phascolarctos
- Species: †P. sulcomaxilliaris

Binomial name
- †Phascolarctos sulcomaxilliaris Travouillon et al., 2026

Extinct species of koala

Phascolarctos sulcomaxilliaris is an extinct species of koala that belongs to the family Phascolarctidae. This species lived in Western Australia during the Pleistocene epoch.

== Discovery ==
Koalas are regionally extinct in Western Australia, but the fossil record shows that they once lived in this region. The fossil record of koalas is poor, however bones have been found in cave deposits. In Southwestern Australia, they have been found in Mammoth Cave, Devil's Lair, Tight Entrance Cave, Kudjal Yolgah Cave and Labyrinth Cave. In the north (north of Perth, the capital city of Western Australia), they can be found in Koala Cave and Madura Cave.

Upon initial discovery, it was assumed that the koala fossils found in Western Australia were the same species as the extant koala (Phascolarctos cinereus), due to them having similar dentition. Two complete skulls have been found, both of which are adults but of different sexes. While these skulls are similar to koalas from Victoria, they show several marked differences that distinguish them from modern koalas. The holotype specimen is WAM 99.10.3, and it was collected by Lindsay Hatcher in Foundation Cave. The holotype is a probable female with a near complete skull and its associated mandibles preserved. The specimen does have damage on the nasals, the left zygomatic arch, right bulla, both paroccipital processes and the ascending ramus. Several paratype specimens were also collected from various caves.

=== Etymology ===
The specific name "sulcomaxilliaris" translates to "grooved maxilla" from Latin – "sulco" meaning "groove" or "furrow", and "maxilliaris" meaning "maxilla", in reference to the maxilla bone, or cheek bone. This is in reference to the features their skull possesses that differentiates it from other koala species.

== Description ==
Their skulls are relatively shorter in length with the maxilla having deeper and obvious concavities located below the zygomatic arch. Its joints are less robust. Their snout width is wider and the bullae is smaller in P. sulcomaxilliaris than in modern koalas. The grooves in their maxilla bones implies they possessed large cheek muscles, earning them the somewhat tentative common name of the "dimpled koala".

== Evolutionary history ==
The oldest has been found in Tight Entrance Cave where it has been dated to around <137 ±3 thousand year old. The youngest material was recovered from Devil's Lair Cave dating to ground 31–45 thousand years old. The extinction of koalas have often been driven by changes in the climate. This can be seen during events such as the Miocene Climatic Optimum where dry conditions lead to the loss of rainforests habitats and the loss of several koala genera such as Litokoala, Nimiokoala and Priscakoala. This also happens during the Pleistocene too where loss of habitat has led to species in the genus Phascolarctos to go extinct. This species too likely went extinct due to changes in the climate that occurred during the late Pleistocene. These changes saw a reduced in eucalyptus forests to around 5% of their current cover. This would have dramatically reduced the amount of food and shelter available to them.

=== Phylogeny ===
While phylogenetic analysis of P. sulcomaxilliaris has recovered it to be a member of the Phascolarctos genus, the relationships between the extinct and extant species are weak.
