= Invictokoala =

Invictokoala Temporal range: Middle Pleistocene 0.326–0.205 Ma

Scientific classification
- Kingdom: Animalia
- Phylum: Chordata
- Class: Mammalia
- Infraclass: Marsupialia
- Order: Diprotodontia
- Family: Phascolarctidae
- Genus: †Invictokoala; Price & Hocknull, 2011
- Species: †I. monticola

Binomial name
- †Invictokoala monticola Price & Hocknull, 2011

Extinct genus of koala

Invictokoala is an extinct genus of phascolarctid from middle Pleistocene-aged cave deposits at Mount Etna of central-eastern Queensland, Australia. Due to its incomplete nature, the relationships of this koala are difficult to establish, although it might represent a holdover from an Oligocene ancestor. The type and only known species is Invictokoala monticola.

== Discovery and naming ==
The fossil remains of Invictokoala were discovered during cave excavations at the Mount Etna Caves National Park in central-eastern Queensland. The type locality, described as Speaking Tube Cave, has a maximum age of 326 ± 22 ka and a minimum age no younger than ~205 ka. The holotype and only known specimen, QM F52796, is a fragment of the maxilla with two molars. The presence of an alveoli for the fourth molar, which is the last tooth to erupt in phascolarctids, and the lack of wear indicates the specimen belongs to a young adult. It was named and described by Gilbert J. Price and Scott A. Hocknull in 2011.

The generic name is derived from the Latin word "invictus", meaning unconquered, unsubdued, invincible, or indomitable. This name was chosen in reference to the longevity of this koala’s lineage, which originated in the Oligocene and survived through periods of significant environmental changes. The specific name stems from the word "monticola", Latin for "dweller from the mountain", in reference to the type locality.

== Description ==
The second molar has length of 7.6 mm, and a width of between 8.1 and 6.6 mm. The third molar is similarly long (7.5 mm), but differs in width (between 6.3 and 6.7 mm). Like other phascolarctids, these molars are selenodont with W-shaped blades. However, they also lack crenulations, which is a trait not seen in most other phascolarctids. Each molar has four main cusps, with the two front cusps representing the paraconene and protocone, and the back two representing the metacone and metaconule. In the second molar, the paracone and metacone are roughly the same height, followed by the protocone and metacone. On the other hand, all major cusps are equal in height on the third molar. The paraconule is made up of three small cusps, an autapomorphy (unique derived feature) of the genus, and is absent on the third molar. Another feature that sets Invictokoala apart from other phascolarctids is that stylar cusps C and D are positioned more closely.

Invictokoala has an estimated body weight of 7.5–7.8 kg (16.5-17.4 lbs), falling within the range of the modern koala.

== Classification ==
When first described, it was stated that Invictokoala shares affinities with the plesiomorphic phascolarctid Madakoala, such as the presence of large stylar cusps, and lack of lingual cingulae and protostyles. Because Invictokoala is only known from the Middle Pleistocene, the close relationship with Madakoala implies that there is a long ghost lineage extending back into the Oligocene that is not known in the fossil record.

However, more recent research has questioned this relationship. The first phylogenetic analysis to include Invictokoala was that of Karen H. Black and colleagues in 2012, where it was placed in an unresolved polytomy with Priscakoala, Koobor, Madakoala, and a clade containing all other phascolarctids. A study published by Chrichton et al. in 2023 found it to be deeply nested within Phascolarctidae.

A cladogram of the results of the 2023 phylogenetic analysis by Arthur Crichton and colleagues is shown below:

- Phascolarctidae
  - †Priscakoala lucyturnbullae
  - - - †Madakoala spp.
      - †Perikoala robustus
    - - †Invictokoala monticola
      - - †Koobor notabilis
        - - †Nimiokoala greystanesi
          - †Litokoala dicksmithi
          - - †Litokoala kutjamarpensis
            - - †Stelakoala riversleighensis
              - Phascolarctos cinereus

== Paleobiology ==
=== Paleoecology ===
Judging from its selenodont dentition and small crown height relative to grazers, Invictokoala was a browser. The lack of enamel crenulations suggests that it fed primarily on a diet of soft plants. During the Middle Pleistocene, the Mount Etna region would have been covered in dense rainforest. Fossils of Phascolarctos have been recovered from similarly aged cave deposits as Invictokoala at Mount Etna, making them temporally coeval. The two taxa overlapped in body size, but were able to coexist by preferring different habitats, with the former preferring open forests and woodlands and the latter rainforest.

=== Extinction ===
Invictokoala is thought to have gone extinct during the late Middle Pleistocene, sometime between ~280,000 and 170,000 years ago. The reasons for its extinction are believed to be habitat loss, resulting from climate change.
