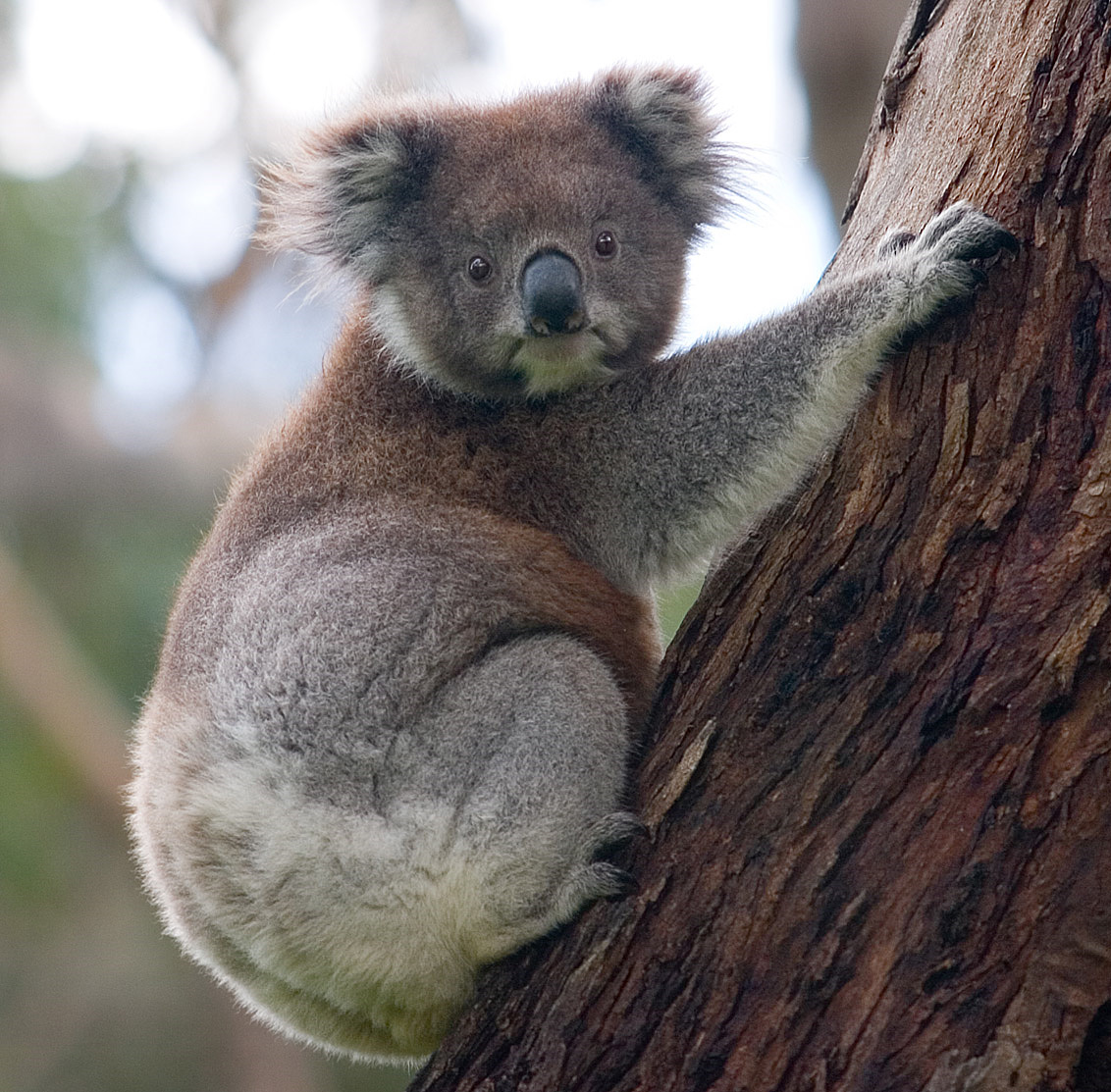
- A koala (Phascolarctos cinereus) climbing a tree in Otway National Park, Victoria, Australia

Scientific classification
- Kingdom: Animalia
- Phylum: Chordata
- Class: Mammalia
- Infraclass: Marsupialia
- Order: Diprotodontia
- Family: Phascolarctidae
- Genus: Phascolarctos; Blainville, 1816

Type species
- Lipurus cinereus Goldfuss, 1817

Species
- Phascolarctos cinereus (Goldfuss, 1817), koala; †Phascolarctos maris N. S. Pledge, 1987.; †Phascolarctos stirtoni Bartholomai, 1968.; †Phascolarctos sulcomaxilliaris (Travouillon, 2026); †Phascolarctos yorkensis (Black and Archer, 1997)

Synonyms
- Draximenus Anonymous, 1829; Draximenus Lay, 1825; Koala Schinz, 1821; Kola Gray, 1821; Lipurus Goldfuss, 1817; Liscurus McMurtrie, 1834; Morodactylus Goldfuss, 1820; Phascolarctus Brookes, 1828

= Phascolarctos =

Genus of marsupials

Phascolarctos is a genus of marsupials with one extant species, the koala Phascolarctos cinereus, an iconic animal of Australia. Several extinct species of the genus are known from fossil material; these were also large tree dwellers that browsed on Eucalyptus leaves.

== Taxonomy ==
The genus was named by French zoologist Henri Marie Ducrotay de Blainville in 1816.

The type species, the modern koala, was named as Lipurus cinereus by G. A. Goldfuss in 1817, later combined as Phascolarctos cinereus. Goldfuss published this name with a reproduction of John Lewin's 1803 illustration of the species in New South Wales.

An accepted synonymy of other generic names referring to Phascolarctos was published in 1988. The koala is listed in national conservation legislation as "Phascolarctos cinereus (combined populations of Qld, NSW and the ACT)", previously determined in 2012 to be "a species for the purposes of the EPBC act 1999" (EPBC). The koala was classified as Least Concern on the Red List, and reassessed as Vulnerable in 2014.

The name is derived from Ancient Greek φάσκωλος (phaskolos) 'pouch' and ἄρκτος (arktos) 'bear'.

== Description ==
Phascolarctos is a genus of large arboreal marsupials that has specialised in leaves of Eucalyptus, a poor quality and potentially toxic food source that is unavailable to most other native mammals. The extinct species are presumed to have similar diet and habits to the modern koala, the largest Australian folivore, which was exceeded in size by the even more robust P. stirtoni. The tail of koalas is almost absent, an unusual characteristic for a tree climbing mammal, although other anatomical features are well suited to that habitat. They have some resemblance to the wombats, a family of large terrestrial marsupials which are allied with koalas as Vombatiformes.

The fossil material referred to the extinct species of this genus is scarce and fragmentary. Some remains are tentatively referred to Phascolarctos stirtoni, and the specimen for Phascolarctos maris, a partial lower molar, was later suggested by Karen H. Black to be an example of variance within the P. stirtoni species.

== Distribution ==
Phascolarctos species have been discovered as fossil remains in several regions across southern and eastern Australia, in South Australia, Queensland and Victoria, and still occurs in those states and New South Wales. The modern koala is also known in the fossil record of the southwest of Australia and many other regions, but no occurrence of a living or extinct Phascolarctos species is recorded in the states of Tasmania and the Northern Territory.

The existing koala P. cinereus once had a wide range across the continent, which substantially contracted as a consequence of climatic changes that included extremes such as glacial cycles. Extinction of regional populations includes their disappearance from Western Australia after the mid to late Pleistocene, where their previous success is indicated by numerous fossils discovered in the Leeuwin-Naturaliste region. The disappearance from Southwest Australia coincided with a change in the region's fire regimes.

The temporal range of the Phascolarctus species includes fossils dated to the early Pliocene and mid to late Pleistocene. The earliest record of P. cinereus, the only species of the modern era, is dated to around 350 000 years ago. Phascolarctus is a remnant of a family that includes eight to ten genera, the Phascolarctidae, which diverged around 26 million years ago (during the Oligocene epoch).

The records for Phascolarctos yorkensis (Pledge, 1992) include occurrences in Curramulka Local Fauna in South Australia and Wellington Caves in New South Wales, possibly datable to the late Miocene.

== Classification ==
Phascolarctos gives its name to the Phascolarctidae family, which allies a number of other genera that are now extinct. Anatomical similarities suggest the probably share a common ancestor of Vombatidae, represented by the living species of Vombatus and Lasiorhinus; the wombats are their closest extant relations among the Diprotodontia order of marsupials.

Family Phascolarctidae

- Genus †Nimiokoala
- Genus †Invictokoala
- Genus †Madakoala
- Genus †Litokoala
- Genus †Koobor
- Genus †Perikoala
- Genus Phascolarctos
  - Koala - Phascolarctos cinereus
  - †Phascolarctos maris (N. S. Pledge, 1987)
  - †Phascolarctos stirtoni (Bartholomai, 1968)
  - †Phascolarctos yorkensis (Black and Archer, 1997) formerly Cundokoala, now recognised as a junior synonym
  - †Phascolarctos sulcomaxilliaris (Travouillon et al., 2026)
- Genus †Priscakoala

A previously recognised arrangement of infraspecific taxa may be summarised as

- Phascolarctos cinereus Koala
  - Phascolarctos cinereus adustus, (Thomas 1923) Mundubbera, QLD
  - Phascolarctos cinereus cinereus, (Goldfuss 1817) NSW
  - Phascolarctos cinereus victor, (Troughton 1935) 'Booral', Victoria

Three subspecies have been recognised within the existing species, based on specimens collected in Queensland, New South Wales and a "southern race" in Victoria. These may only represent clinal variation within the species at different latitudes, a conclusion reached by a genomic comparison in 2019 that found no support for a classification as three subspecies; the study instead supports a proposal for the population be recognised as a single evolutionary significant unit for conservation purposes.
