= Madakoala =

Scientific classification
- Domain: Eukaryota
- Kingdom: Animalia
- Phylum: Chordata
- Class: Mammalia
- Infraclass: Marsupialia
- Order: Diprotodontia
- Family: Phascolarctidae
- Genus: †Madakoala; Woodburne, Tedford, Archer, and Pledge, 1987

Species
- †Madakoala devisi; ††Madakoala wellsi; †Madakoala robustus

Genus of mammals

Madakoala is a genus of extinct phascolarctid marsupials with three known species, Madakoala devisi, Madakoala wellsi and Madakoala robustus. It is allied to extinct genera Invictokoala, Koobor, Litokoala, Nimiokoala, Perikoala and Priscakoala, along with Phascolarctos, the genus of the existing koala. Madakoala went extinct around 280,000 years ago in the Pleistocene epoch. They are known to exist by limited cranial material in fossils, so the existence of some of the subspecies is questionable because of missing dental data.
