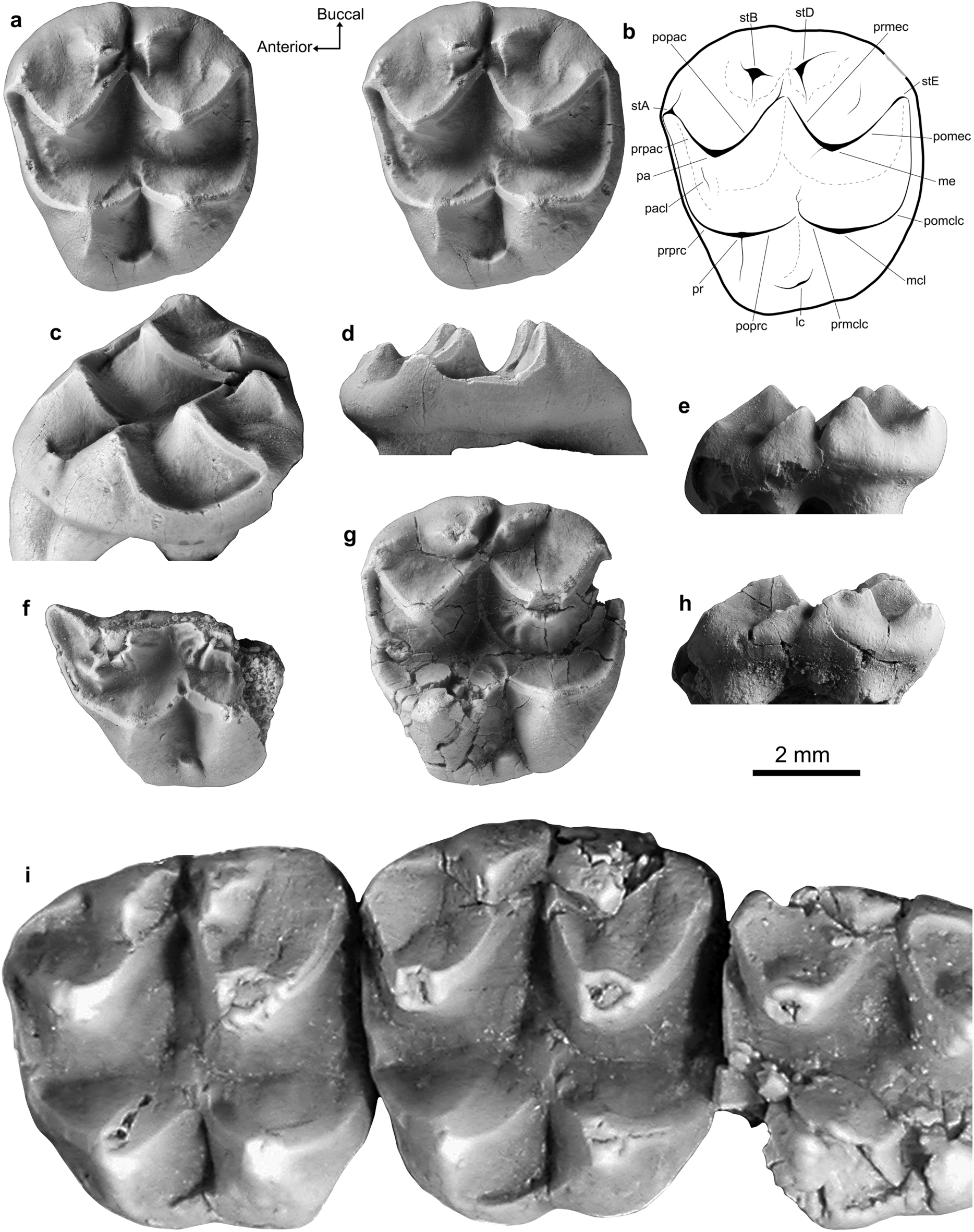
- Upper dentition of P. lucyturnbullae (i) compared to those of Lumakoala blackae

Scientific classification
- Kingdom: Animalia
- Phylum: Chordata
- Class: Mammalia
- Infraclass: Marsupialia
- Order: Diprotodontia
- Family: Phascolarctidae
- Genus: †Priscakoala; Black et al, 2012
- Species: †P. lucyturnbullae

Binomial name
- †Priscakoala lucyturnbullae Black et al, 2012

= Priscakoala =

Priscakoala Temporal range: Early Miocene, 18.5–17.0 Ma

Extinct genus of marsupials

Priscakoala (lit. 'ancient koala') is an extinct genus of koala that lived in Queensland, Australia during the Early Miocene. The genus contains a single species, Priscakoala lucyturnbullae, known from a partial skull bone and isolated teeth recovered from the freshwater limestone deposits of the Riversleigh World Heritage Area. It lived alongside other koalas such as Nimiokoala, and likely fed on soft leaves.

== History and naming ==
Location of the Riversleigh World Heritage Area in Queensland

The fossil remains of Priscakoala were unearthed from several localities at the Riversleigh World Heritage Area, in the Boodjamulla National Park, north-western Queensland. The holotype specimen is QM F20303, and consists of a maxillary fragment with three preserved molars. It is from the Early Miocene-aged Creaser’s Ramparts Site. A lower molar was found in the same spot as the holotype. Two upper molars are known from the Cadbury’s Kingdom Site and Camel Sputum Site, respectively.

In 2012, Karen Black and colleagues described Priscakoala lucyturnbullae as a new genus and species of koala based on these fossil remains. The prefix "prisca" comes from the Latin word for 'old, ancient, primeval or primitive'. It was used to indicate that this genus is one of the oldest and simplest form of koala. The specific epithet, lucyturnbullae, honours Lucy Turnbull, a businesswoman, wife of former Prime Minister Malcolm Turnbull, and supporter of the research that discovered the genus.

== Classification ==
Black and colleagues (2012) performed two phylogenetic analyses to determine the relationships of Priscakoala using a new character matrix derived from several past analyses. The strict consensus parsimony analysis placed it as the basalmost member of the family Phascolarctidae, but failed to resolve the relative positions of Invictokoala, Madakoala, and Koobor. As a result, Invictokoala was subsequently excluded from the matrix and further analyses due to the fragmentary nature of its fossils. In their single most-parsimonious analysis, Phascolarctidae was better resolved and the position of Priscakoala remained unchanged.

In 2023, Crichton and colleagues described Lumakoala blackae from the Pwerte Marnte Marnte fossil beds in the Northern Territory. To test the relationships of Lumakoala, Crichton and colleagues added it to an updated version of the phylogenetic matrix of Beck et al. (2020). The unconstrained Bayesian and maximum parsimony analyses both recovered Priscakoala as the basalmost phascolarctid. In the constrained analysis, however, it formed a polytomy with Lumakoala and a clade containing the rest of Phascolarctidae.

- Diprotodontia
  - Cercartetus lepidus
  - †Thylacoleonidae
  - Vombatiformes
    - Vombatomorphia
    - Phascolarctidae
      - †Lumakoala blackae
      - †Priscakoala lucyturnbullae
      - - - †Madakoala spp.
          - †Perikoala robustus
        - - †Invictokoala monticola
          - - †Koobor notabilis
            - - †Nimiokoala greystanesi
              - †Litokoala dicksmithi
              - - †Litokoala kutjamarpensis
                - - †Stelakoala riversleighensis
                  - Phascolarctos cinereus

== Paleobiology ==
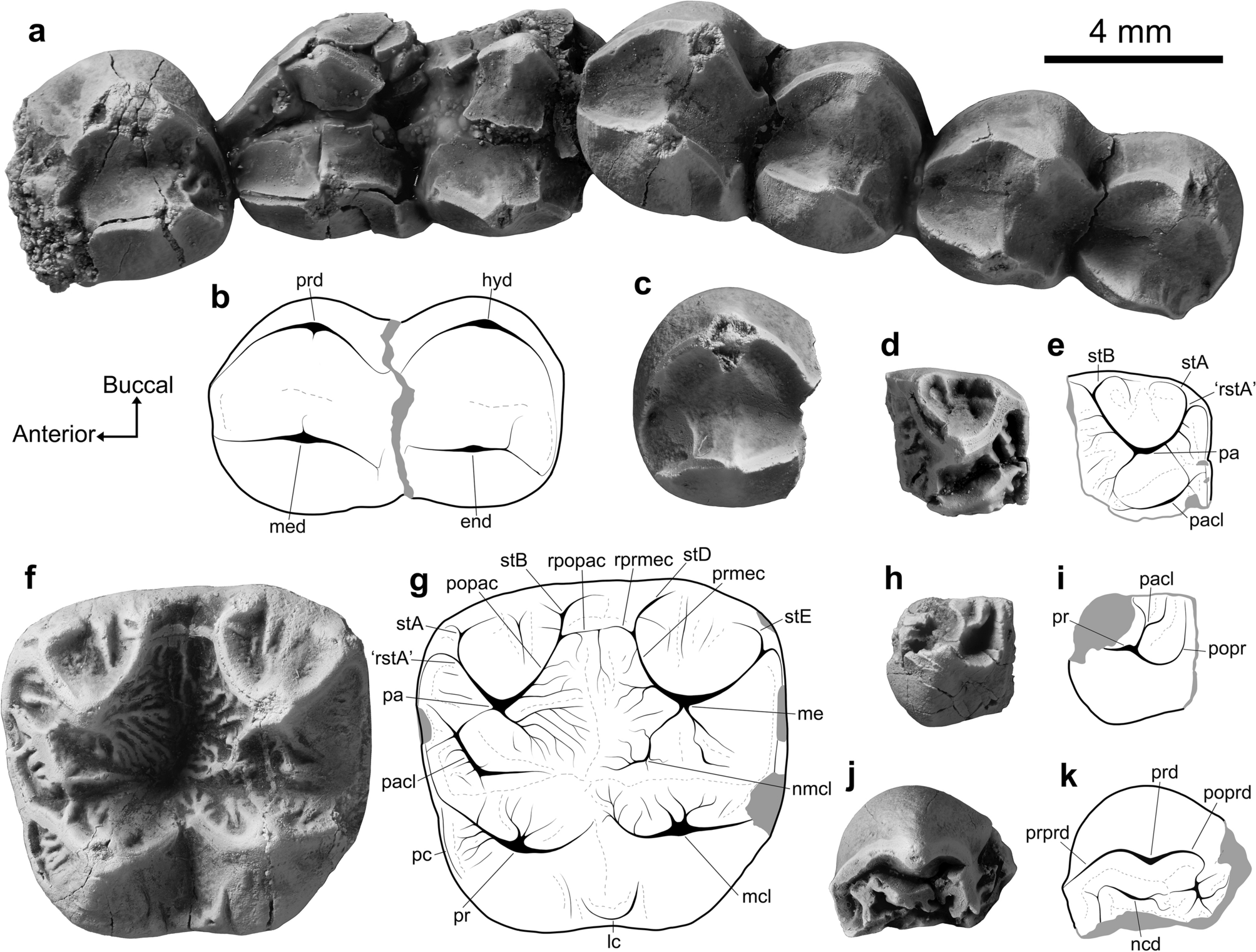
Upper and lower dentition of Nimiokoala (h-k), which is sympatric to Priscakoala

Priscakoala is known from the Creaser’s Ramparts, Camel Sputum and Cadbury’s Kingdom Sites at the Riversleigh World Heritage Area. Camel Sputum Site has been radiometrically dated to ~18.5–17.0 Ma, while Creaser’s Ramparts is estimated to be Early Miocene in age on the basis of biocorrelation. Cadbury's Kingdom Site was originally interpreted as being of Middle Miocene age, but recent work has assigned it an Early Miocene age. Various factors like the high number of arboreal taxa, overall species richness and the presence of certain rainforest taxa suggests that these sites were deposited in a lowland rainforest environment. Priscakoala was sympatric with Nimiokoala greystanesi, which was about half its size. It likely avoided competition by feeding on relatively softer leaves.

Other mammals that lived alongside Priscakoala include the thylacinids Wabulacinus and Ngamalacinus; the bandicoot Yarala; the wynyardiid Namilamadeta; the palorchestid Propalorchestes; the diprotodontids Ngapakaldia and Neohelos; the pygmy possum Burramys; the ringtail possums Paljara and Djaludjangi; the scaly-tailed possum Wyulda; the ektopodontid possum Ektopodon; the balbarids Ganawamaya and Balbaroo; the propleopine Ekaltadeta; the macropodids Wabularoo, Bulungamaya and Ganguroo; and the enigmatic marsupial Yalkaparidon.
