= Haycocknema perplexum =

Scientific classification
- Domain: Eukaryota
- Kingdom: Animalia
- Phylum: Nematoda
- Class: Enoplea
- Order: Muspiceida
- Family: Robertdollfusiidae
- Genus: Haycocknema; Spratt, Beveridge, Andrews & Dennett, 1999
- Species: H. perplexum

Binomial name
- Haycocknema perplexum Spratt, Beveridge, Andrews & Dennett, 1999

Species of roundworm

Haycocknema perplexum are parasitic nematodes which reside in tissue under the skin or in blood vessels. The origin of their natural host is unknown. This group comprises 8% of nematode species affecting vertebrates.

Clinical symptoms of haycocknema perplexum include eosinophilia and high levels of creatine kinase. While rare, with only thirteen documented cases, all originating in Australia, this parasite can become fatal if left untreated due to muscular dystrophy of the respiratory system.

The first case was documented in 1998, and no cases in non-human animals have been reported as of 2022. Only one documented death from complications of infection has been recorded.

The current treatment for the parasite is 400 mg of Albendazole. The broad-spectrum anthelmintic drug can treat diseases by impairing the parasite's ability to absorb glucose, resulting in its death.
