= Durikainema =

Scientific classification
- Kingdom: Animalia
- Phylum: Nematoda
- Class: Enoplea
- Order: Muspiceida
- Family: Robertdollfusiidae
- Genus: Durikainema; Spratt & Speare, 1982

Type species
- Durikainema macropi Spratt & Speare, 1982

Species
- D. macropi D. phascolarcti

Genus of roundworms

Durikainema is a genus of two nematodes in the family Robertdollfusiidae. Species have a head with a cuticular cephalic inflation, elongated papillae and amphids, and well-developed musculature. Characteristics of the males include a single spicule and a long attenuated tail. Durikainema species parasitize macropods. The genus was circumscribed in 1982 with the type species Durikainema macropi, a parasite of the eastern grey kangaroo (Macropus giganteus). D. phascolarcti, parasite of the koala (Phascolarctos cinereus), was described in 1998.
