= Robertdollfusiidae =

Scientific classification
- Domain: Eukaryota
- Kingdom: Animalia
- Phylum: Nematoda
- Class: Enoplea
- Order: Muspiceida
- Family: Robertdollfusiidae; Chabaud & Campana, 1950

Synonyms
- Robertdollfusidae Chabaud & Campana, 1950

Family of roundworms

Robertdollfusiidae is a family of nematodes belonging to the order Muspiceida.

Genera:

- Durikainema Spratt & Speare, 1982
- Haycocknema Spratt, Beveridge, Andrews & Dennett, 1999
- Lappnema Bain & Nikander, 1983
- Robertdollfusa Chabaud & Campana, 1950
