= Muspiceidae =

Scientific classification
- Domain: Eukaryota
- Kingdom: Animalia
- Phylum: Nematoda
- Class: Enoplea
- Order: Muspiceida
- Family: Muspiceidae

Family of roundworms

Muspiceidae is a family of nematodes belonging to the order Muspiceida.

Genera:

- Lukonema Chabaud & Bain, 1974
- Maseria Rausch & Rausch, 1983
- Muspicea Sambon, 1925
- Pennisia Bain & Chabaud, 1979
- Riouxgolvania Bain & Chabaud, 1968
