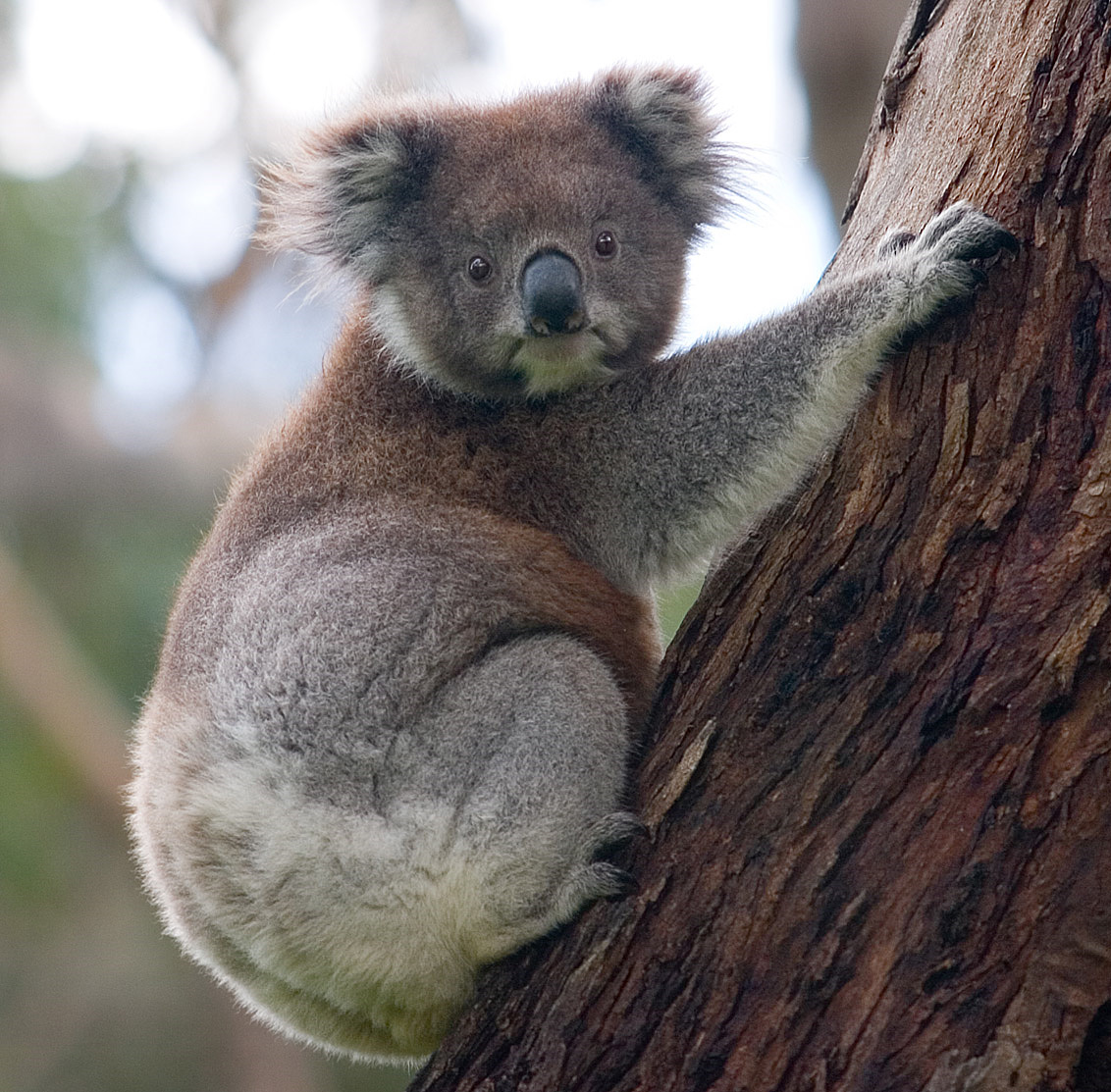

Conservation status
- Vulnerable (IUCN 3.1)

Scientific classification
- Kingdom: Animalia
- Phylum: Chordata
- Class: Mammalia
- Infraclass: Marsupialia
- Order: Diprotodontia
- Family: Phascolarctidae
- Genus: Phascolarctos
- Species: P. cinereus

Binomial name
- Phascolarctos cinereus (Goldfuss, 1817)
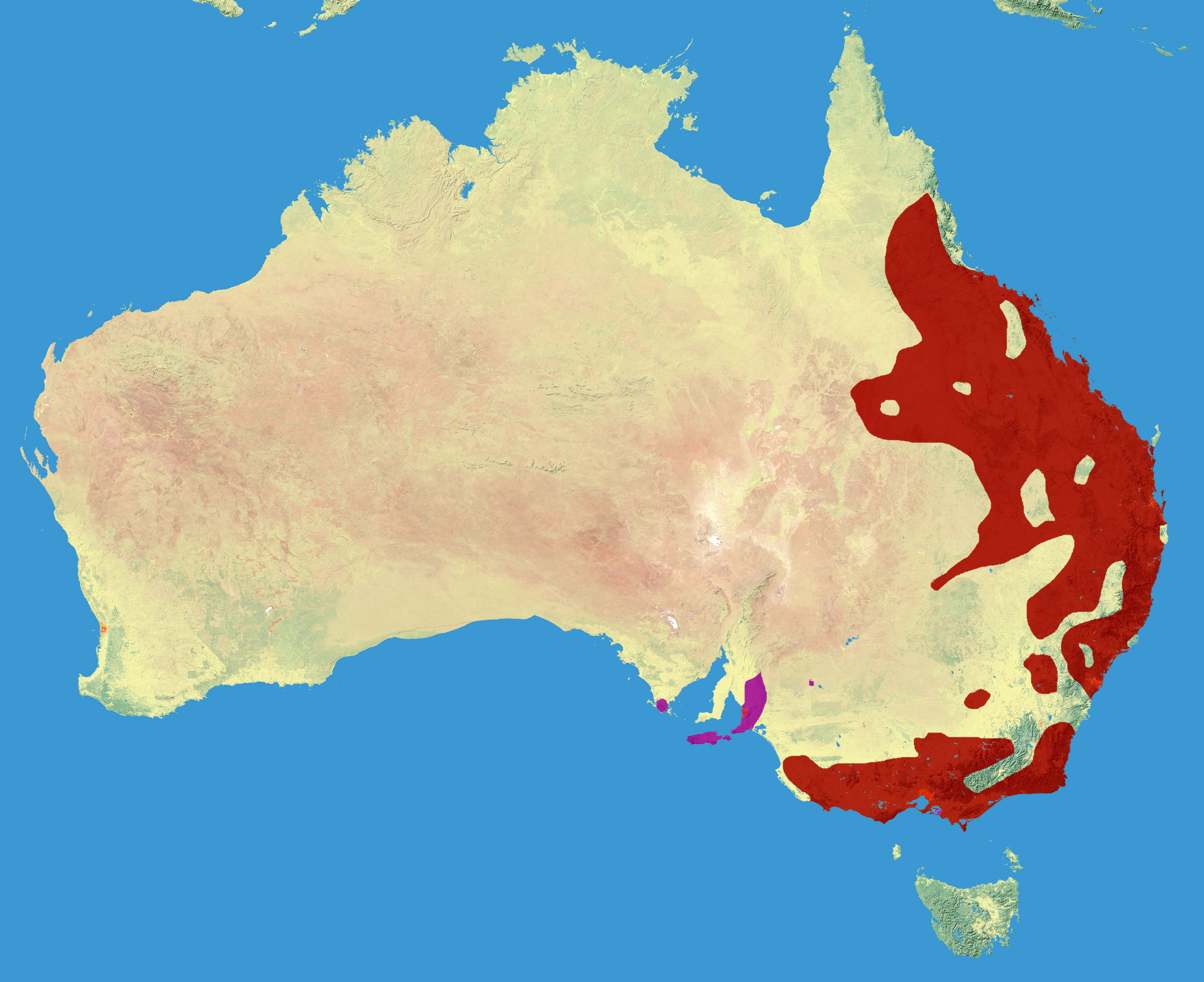
- Koala range Native Introduced

Synonyms
- Lipurus cinereus Goldfuss, 1817; Marodactylus cinereus Goldfuss, 1820; Phascolarctos fuscus Desmarest, 1820; Phascolarctos flindersii Lesson, 1827; Phascolarctos koala J.E. Gray, 1827; Koala subiens Burnett, 1830

= Koala =

Koala Temporal range: 0.7–0 Ma Middle Pleistocene – Recent

Arboreal herbivorous marsupial native to Australia

The koala (Phascolarctos cinereus), sometimes inaccurately called the koala bear, is an arboreal herbivorous marsupial native to Australia. It is the only extant representative of the family Phascolarctidae. Its closest living relatives are the wombats. The koala is found in coastal areas of the continent's eastern and southern regions, inhabiting Queensland, New South Wales, Victoria, and South Australia. It is easily recognisable by its stout, tailless body and large head with round, fluffy ears and large, dark nose. The koala has a body length of 60–85 cm (24–33 in) and weighs 4–15 kg (8.8–33.1 lb). Its fur colour ranges from silver grey to chocolate brown. Koalas from the northern populations are typically smaller and lighter in colour than their counterparts further south. These populations are possibly separate subspecies, but not all researchers accept this.

Koalas typically inhabit open Eucalyptus woodland, as the leaves of these trees make up most of their diet. This eucalypt diet has low nutritional and caloric content and contains toxic compounds that deter most other mammals from feeding on them. Koalas are largely sedentary and sleep up to twenty hours a day. They are asocial; only mothers bond to dependent offspring. Adult males communicate with bellows that intimidate rivals and attract mates. Males mark their presence with secretions from scent glands located on their chests. Like other marsupials, koalas give birth to young known as joeys at a very early stage of development. They crawl into their mothers' pouches, where they live for their first six to seven months. They are fully weaned around a year old.

Koalas have few natural predators and parasites, but are threatened by pathogens such as Chlamydiaceae bacteria and koala retrovirus. Koalas are listed as a vulnerable species by the International Union for Conservation of Nature. Among the many threats to their existence are habitat destruction caused by agriculture, urbanisation, droughts, and associated wildfires, some related to climate change. In February 2022, the koala was officially listed as endangered in the Australian Capital Territory, New South Wales, and Queensland. They are however over-abundant in parts of South Australia and Victoria, with population growth at unsustainable levels.

Because of their distinctive appearance, koalas, along with kangaroos, are recognised worldwide as symbols of Australia. They were hunted by Aboriginal Australians and depicted in myths and cave art for millennia. The first recorded encounter between a European and a koala was in 1798, and an image of the animal was published in 1810 by naturalist George Perry. Botanist Robert Brown wrote the first detailed scientific description in 1814 although his work remained unpublished for 180 years. Artist John Gould illustrated and described the koala, thereby introducing the species to the British public. Further details about the animal's biology were revealed in the 19th century by English scientists.

== Etymology ==
The word "koala" comes from the Dharug word gula, meaning 'no water'. Although the vowel "u" was originally written in the English orthography as "oo" (in spellings such as coola or koolah—two syllables), the spelling for that sound later became "oa"; the word is now pronounced in three syllables (ko-a-la) possibly in error based on that new spelling. Another hypothesis is that "koala" was an Aboriginal name from the Hawkesbury River district near Sydney.

Adopted by white settlers, the word "koala" became one of hundreds of Aboriginal loan words in Australian English, where it was also commonly referred to as "native bear", later "koala bear", for its resemblance to a bear. It is one of several Aboriginal words that made it into International English alongside words like "didgeridoo" and "kangaroo".

The koala's generic name, Phascolarctos, is derived from the Greek words φάσκωλος (phaskolos) 'pouch' and ἄρκτος (arktos) 'bear'. The specific name, cinereus, is Latin for 'ash coloured'.

== Taxonomy ==
The generic name Phascolarctos was given in 1816 by French zoologist Henri Marie Ducrotay de Blainville, who did not give it a specific name until further review. In 1819, German zoologist Georg August Goldfuss gave it the binomial Lipurus cinereus. Because Phascolarctos was published first, according to the International Code of Zoological Nomenclature, it has priority as the official genus name. French naturalist Anselme Gaëtan Desmarest coined the name Phascolarctos fuscus in 1820, suggesting that the brown-coloured versions were a different species than the grey ones. Other names suggested by European authors included Marodactylus cinereus by Goldfuss in 1820, P. flindersii by René-Primevère Lesson in 1827, and P. koala by John Edward Gray in 1827.

=== Evolution ===
The koala is classified with wombats (family Vombatidae) and several extinct families (including marsupial tapirs, marsupial lions and giant wombats) in the suborder Vombatiformes within the order Diprotodontia. The Vombatiformes are a sister group to a clade that includes macropods (kangaroos and wallabies) and possums. The koala's lineage possibly branched off around 40 million years ago during the Eocene.

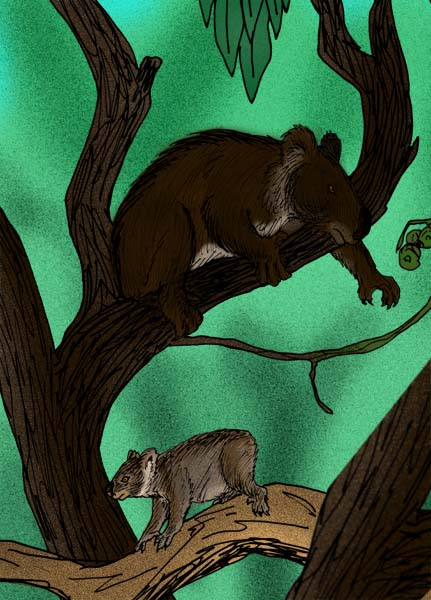
Reconstructions of the ancient koalas Nimiokoala (larger), and Litokoala (smaller), from the Miocene Riversleigh Fauna

The modern koala is the only extant member of Phascolarctidae, a family that includes several extinct genera and species. During the Oligocene and Miocene, koalas lived in rainforests and had broader diets. Some species, such as Nimiokoala greystanesi and some species of Perikoala, were around the same size as the modern koala, while others, such as species of Litokoala, were one-half to two-thirds its size. Like the modern species, prehistoric koalas had well developed ear structures, which suggests that they also made long-distance vocalisations and had a relatively inactive lifestyle. During the Miocene, the Australian continent began drying out, leading to the decline of rainforests and the spread of open Eucalyptus woodlands. The genus Phascolarctos split from Litokoala in the late Miocene, and had several adaptations that allowed it to live on a eucalyptus diet: the palate shifted towards the front of the skull; the upper teeth were lined by thicker bone, molars became relatively low compared to the jaw joint and with more chewing surface; the pterygoid fossa shrank; and a larger gap separated the incisor teeth and the molars.

P. cinereus may have emerged as a dwarf form of the giant koala (P. stirtoni), following the disappearance of several giant animals in the late Pleistocene. A 2008 study questioned this hypothesis, noting that P. cinereus and P. stirtoni were sympatric during the mid-late Pleistocene, and that their teeth morphology displayed the major differences. The fossil record of the modern koala extends back at least to the middle Pleistocene.

Molecular relationship between living Diprotodontia families based on Phillips and collages (2023)

- - - Vombatidae (wombats)
    - Phascolarctidae (koalas)
  - - - Acrobatidae
      - - Tarsipedidae (honey possum)
        - - Petauridae (wrist-winged gliders and allies)
          - Pseudocheiridae (ringtail possums and allies)
    - - Macropodidae (kangaroos, wallabies and allies)
      - - Phalangeridae (brushtail possums and cuscuses)
        - Burramyidae (pygmy possums)

Morphology tree of Phascolarctidae based on Beck and collages (2020)

- - Thylacoleonidae (extinct marsupial lion and allies)
  - - Vombatomorphia (wombats and fossil relatives)
    - - Phascolarctidae
        - Priscakoala lucyturnbullae
        - - - Madakoala spp.
            - Perikoala robustus
          - - Nimiokoala greystanesi
            - - Litokoala dicksmithi
              - - Litokoala kutjamarpensis
                - Phascolarctos cinereus

=== Genetics and variations ===
Three subspecies have been described: the Queensland koala (Phascolarctos cinereus adustus, Thomas 1923), the New South Wales koala (Phascolarctos cinereus cinereus, Goldfuss 1817), and the Victorian koala (Phascolarctos cinereus victor, Troughton 1935). These forms are distinguished by pelage colour and thickness, body size, and skull shape. The Queensland koala is the smallest, with silver or grey short hairs and a shorter skull. The Victorian koala is the largest, with shaggier, brown fur and a wider skull. The geographic limits of these variations are based on state borders, and their status as subspecies is disputed. A 1999 genetic study suggests koalas exist as a cline within a single evolutionarily significant unit with limited gene flow between local populations. In 2016, a comprehensive phylogenetic study did not support the recognition of any subspecies.

Other studies have found that koala populations are highly inbred with low genetic variation. A 2026 whole-genome study estimated that a major population decline began around 100,000 years ago and culminated in a severe genetic bottleneck about 60,000 years ago, indicating that the species' low genetic diversity predates the arrival of humans in Australia. Rivers and roads limit gene flow and contribute to the isolation of southeast Queensland populations. In April 2013, scientists from the Australian Museum and Queensland University of Technology announced they had fully sequenced the koala genome.

== Characteristics ==
Scratching and grooming

The koala is a robust animal with a large head and vestigial or non-existent tail. It has a body length of 60–90 cm (24–35 in) and a weight of 4–15 kg (8.8–33.1 lb), making it among the largest arboreal marsupials. Koalas from Victoria are twice as heavy as those from Queensland. The species is sexually dimorphic: males are 50% larger than females. Males' noses are more curved and sport chest glands, which are visible as bald patches. The female's pouch opening is secured by a sphincter which holds the young in.

The pelage of the koala is denser on the back. Back fur colour varies from light grey to chocolate brown. The belly fur is whitish; on the rump it is mottled whitish and dark. The koala has the most effective insulating back fur of any marsupial and is resilient to wind and rain, while the belly fur can reflect solar radiation. The koala has curved, sharp claws well adapted for climbing trees. The large forepaws have two opposable digits (the first and second, which are opposable to the other three) that allow them to grip small branches. On the hind paws, the second and third digits are fused, a typical condition for members of the Diprotodontia, and the attached claws (which are still separate) function like a comb. The animal has a robust skeleton and a short, muscular upper body with relatively long upper limbs that contribute to its ability to climb. The thigh muscles are anchored further down the shinbone, increasing its climbing power.

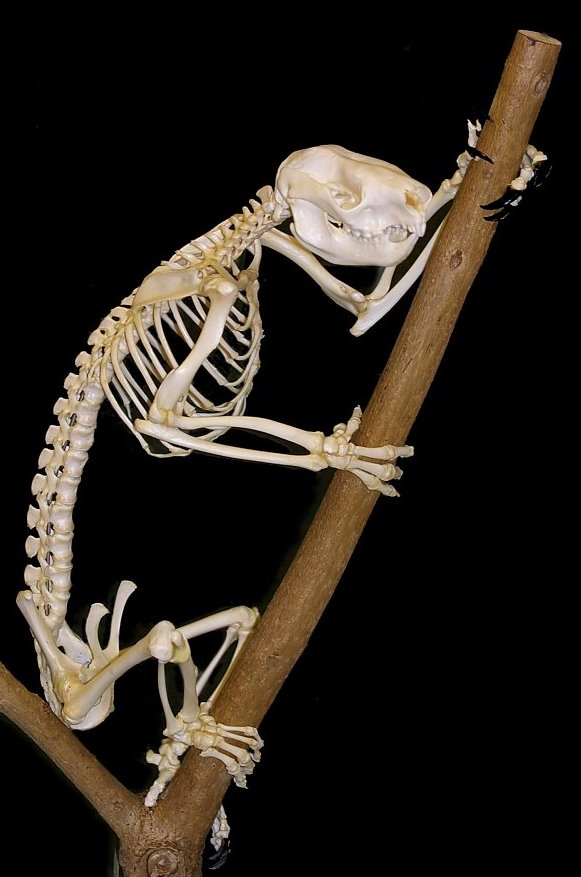
Mounted skeleton

For a mammal, the koala has a disproportionately small brain, 60% smaller than that of a typical diprotodont, weighing only 19.2 g (0.68 oz) on average. The brain's surface is fairly smooth and "primitive". It does not entirely fill the cranial cavity, unlike most mammals, and is lightened by large amounts of cerebrospinal fluid. It is possible that the fluid protects the brain should the animal fall from a tree. The koala's small brain may be an adaptation to the energy restrictions imposed by its diet, which is insufficient to sustain a larger brain. Its small brain limits its ability to perform complex behaviours. For example, it will not eat plucked eucalyptus leaves on a flat surface, which does not match its feeding routine.

The koala has a broad, dark nose with a good sense of smell, and it is known to sniff the oils of individual branchlets to assess their edibility. Its relatively small eyes are unusual among marsupials in that the pupils have vertical slits, an adaptation to living on a more vertical plane. Its round ears provide it with good hearing, and it has a well-developed middle ear. The koala larynx is located relatively low in the vocal tract and can be pulled further down. They possess unique folds in the velum (soft palate), known as velar vocal cords, in addition to the typical vocal folds of the larynx. These features allow the koala to produce deeper sounds than would otherwise be possible for their size.

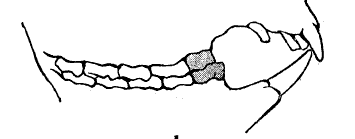
Teeth of a koala, from left to right: molars, premolars (dark), diastema, canines, incisors

The koala has several adaptations for its low nutrient, toxic, and fibrous diet. The animal's dentition consists of incisors and cheek teeth (a single premolar and four molars on each jaw) that are separated by a large gap (a characteristic feature of herbivorous mammals). The koala bites a leaf with the incisors and clips it with the premolars at the petiole, before chewing it to pieces with the cusped molars. Koalas may store food in their cheek pouches before it is ready to be chewed. The partially worn molars of koalas in their prime are optimal for breaking leaves into small particles, resulting in more efficient stomach digestion and nutrient absorption in the small intestine, which digests the eucalyptus leaves to provide most of the animal's energy. A koala sometimes regurgitates the food into the mouth to be chewed a second time.

Koalas are hindgut fermenters, and their digestive retention can last 100 hours in the wild or 200 hours in captivity. This is made possible by their caecum—200 cm (79 in) long and 10 cm (3.9 in) in diameter—possibly the largest for an animal of its size. Koalas can retain food particles for longer fermentation if needed. They are more likely keep smaller particles as larger ones take longer to digest. While the hindgut is relatively large, only 10% of the animal's energy is obtained from digestion in this chamber. The koala's metabolic rate is only 50% of the typical mammalian rate, owing to its low energy intake, although this varies across seasons and sexes. They can digest the toxic plant secondary metabolites, phenolic compounds and terpenes due to their production of cytochrome P450, which neutralises these poisons in the liver. The koala replaces lost water at a lower rate than species such as some possums. It maintains water by absorbing it in the caecum, resulting in drier faecal pellets packed with undigested fibre.

== Distribution and habitat ==
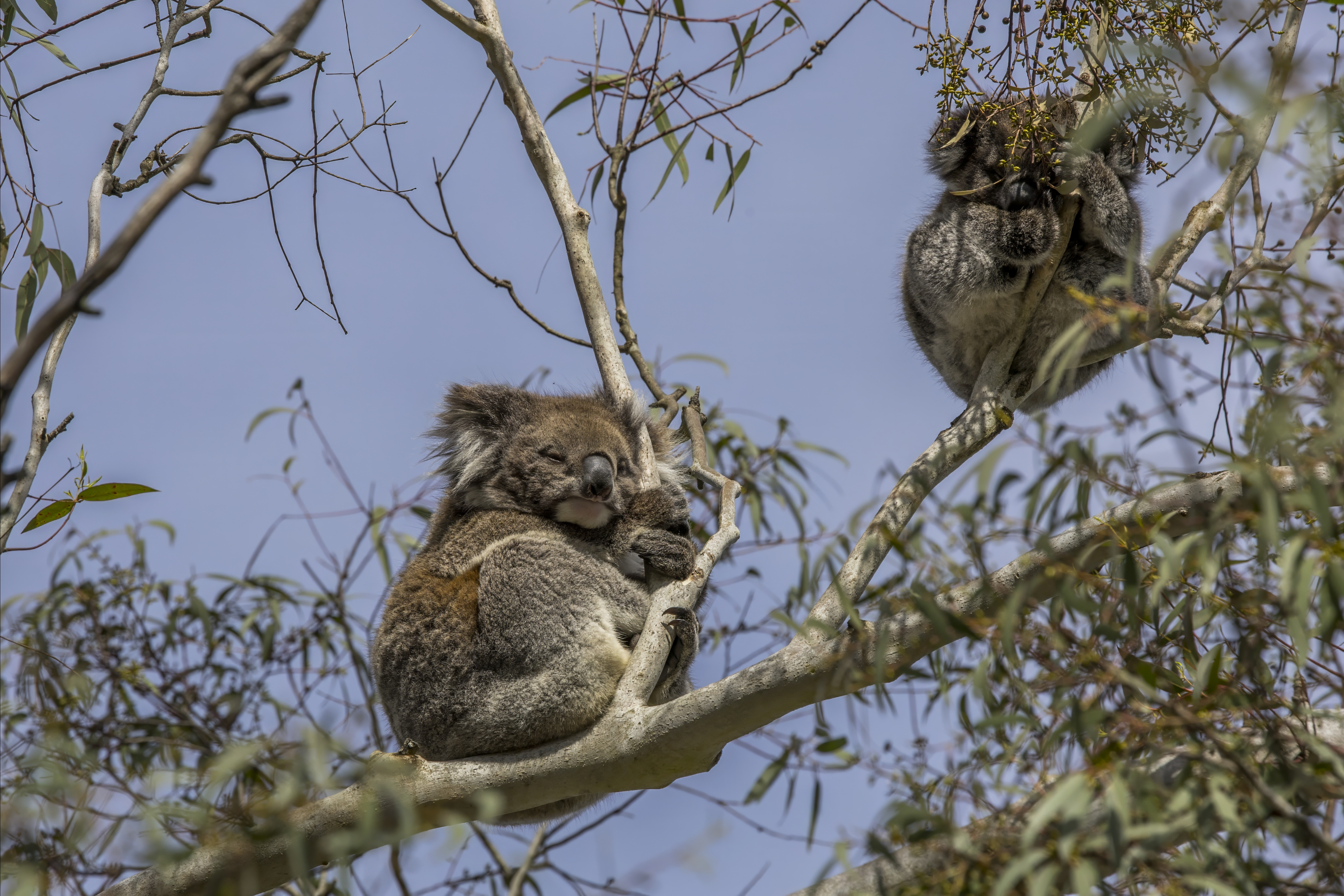
Koala with joey in a tree in South Australia

The koala's range covers roughly 1,000,000 km^{2} (390,000 sq mi), and 30 ecoregions. They can be found in both tropical and temperate habitats ranging from dense woodlands to more spaced-out forests. In semi-arid climates, they prefer riparian habitats, where nearby streams and creeks provide refuge during times of drought and extreme heat. It ranges throughout mainland eastern and southeastern Australia, including the states of Queensland, New South Wales, Victoria, and South Australia. The koala was introduced to several nearby islands. The population on Magnetic Island represents the northern limit of its range.

Fossil evidence shows that the koala's range stretched as far west as southwestern Western Australia during the late Pleistocene. They were likely driven to extinction in these areas by environmental changes and hunting by Aboriginal peoples. Koalas were introduced to Western Australia at Yanchep in 1938, but that population was reduced to 4 individuals by 2022.

== Behaviour and ecology ==
=== Foraging and activities ===
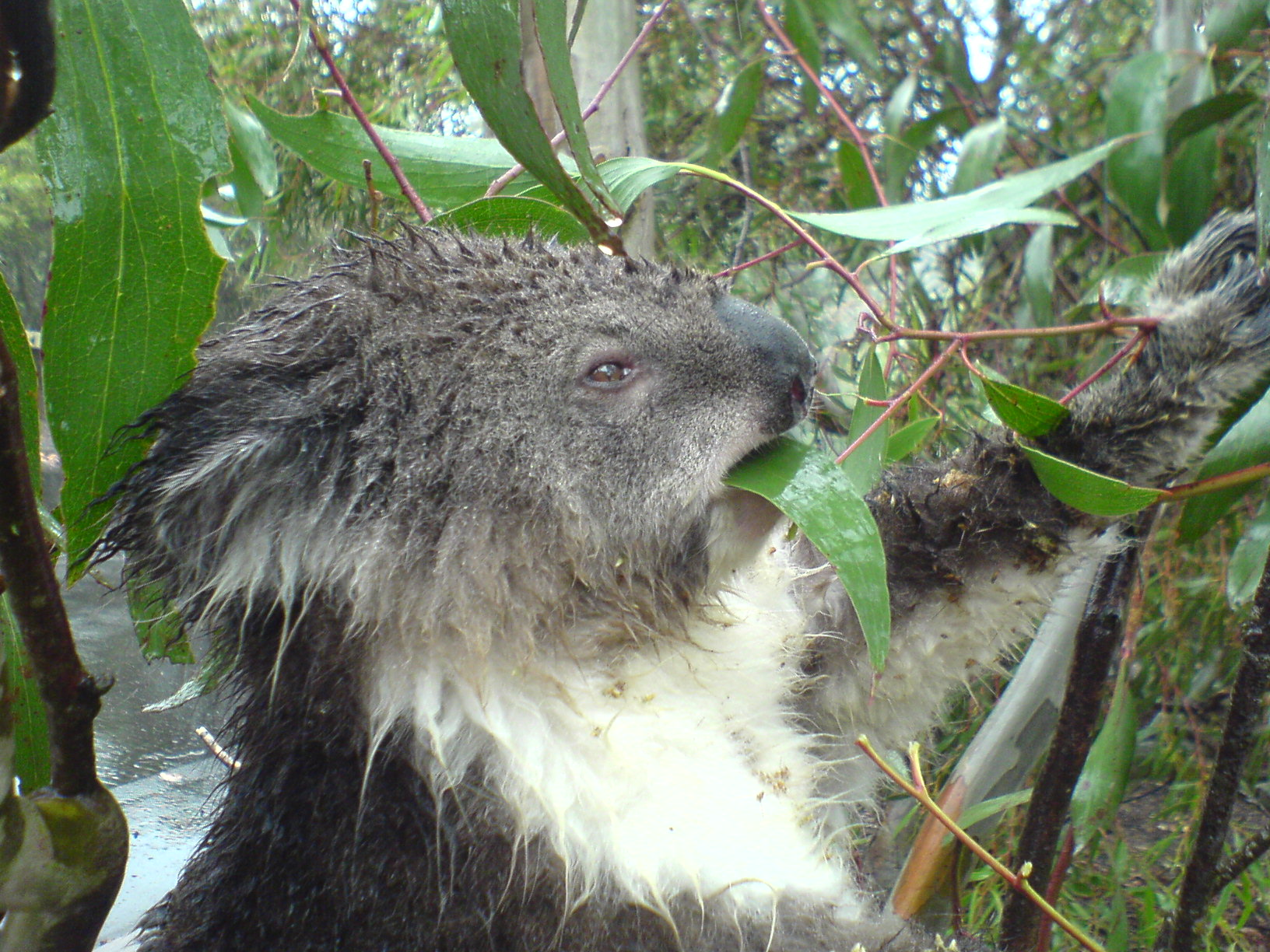
Foraging

Koalas are herbivorous, and while most of their diet consists of eucalypt leaves, they can be found in trees of other genera, such as Acacia, Allocasuarina, Callitris, Leptospermum, and Melaleuca. Though the foliage of over 600 species of Eucalyptus is available, the koala shows a strong preference for around 30. They prefer plant matter with higher protein than fibre and lignin. The most favoured species are Eucalyptus microcorys, E. tereticornis, and E. camaldulensis, which, on average, make up more than 20% of their diet. Despite its reputation as a picky eater, the koala is more generalist than some other marsupial species, such as the greater glider. The koala does not need to drink often as it can get enough water from the leaves, though larger males may additionally drink water found on the ground or in tree hollows. When feeding, a koala reaches out to grab leaves with one forepaw while the other paws hang on to the branch. Depending on the size of the individual, a koala can walk to the end of a branch or must stay near the base. Each day, koalas eat up to 400 grams (14 oz) of leaves, spread over four to six feeding periods. Despite their adaptations to a low-energy lifestyle, they have meagre fat reserves.

Their low-energy diet limits their activity and they sleep 20 hours a day. They are predominantly active at night and spend most of their waking hours foraging. They typically eat and sleep in the same tree, possibly for as long as a day. On warm days, a koala may rest with its back against a branch or lie down with its limbs dangling. When it gets hot, the koala rests lower in the canopy and near the trunk, where the surface is cooler than the surrounding air. It curls up when it gets cold and wet. It resorts to a lower, thicker, branch during high winds. While it spends most of the time in the tree, the animal descends to the ground to move to another tree, with either a walking or leaping gait. Research has shown that their use of the ground is minimal, typically occurring only 2–3 times per night for a total of around 10 minutes — less than 1% of their day. The koala usually grooms itself with its hind paws, with their double claws, but it sometimes uses its forepaws or mouth.

=== Social life ===
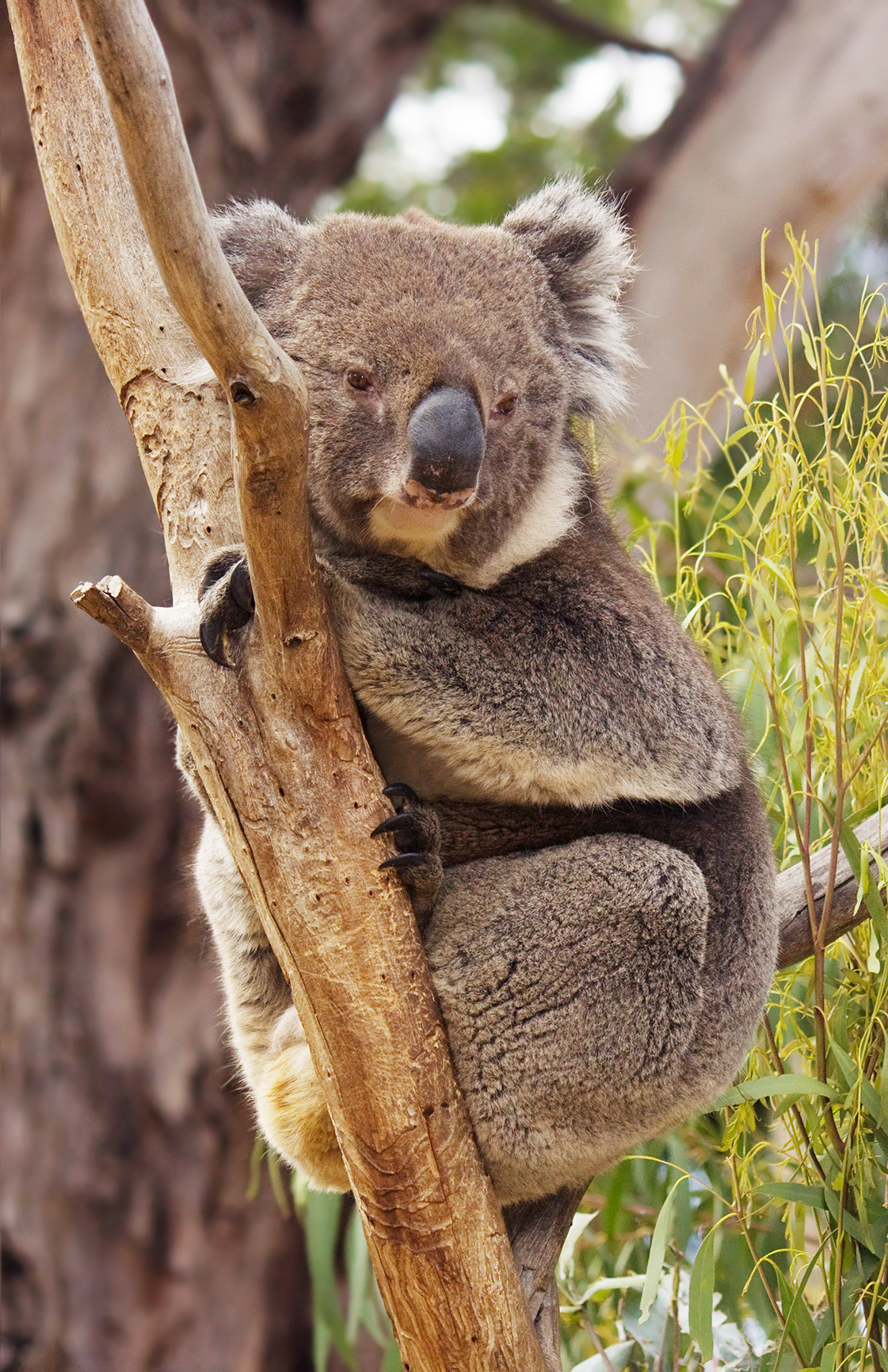
Resting

A bellowing male in the Lone Pine Koala Sanctuary

Koalas are asocial and spend just 15 minutes a day on social behaviours. In areas of higher density and fewer trees, home ranges are smaller and more clumped. Koala society appears to consist of "residents" and "transients": the former are mostly adult females and the latter are males. Resident males appear to be territorial and dominant. The territories of dominant males are found near breeding females, while younger males must wait until they reach full size to challenge for breeding rights. Adult males occasionally venture outside their home ranges; when they do, dominant ones retain their status. As a male climbs a new tree, he rubs his chest against it and sometimes dribbles urine. This scent-marking behaviour probably serves as communication, and individuals are known to sniff the bottom of a newly found tree. Chest gland secretions are complex chemical mixtures—about 40 compounds were identified in one analysis—that vary in composition and concentration across season and age.

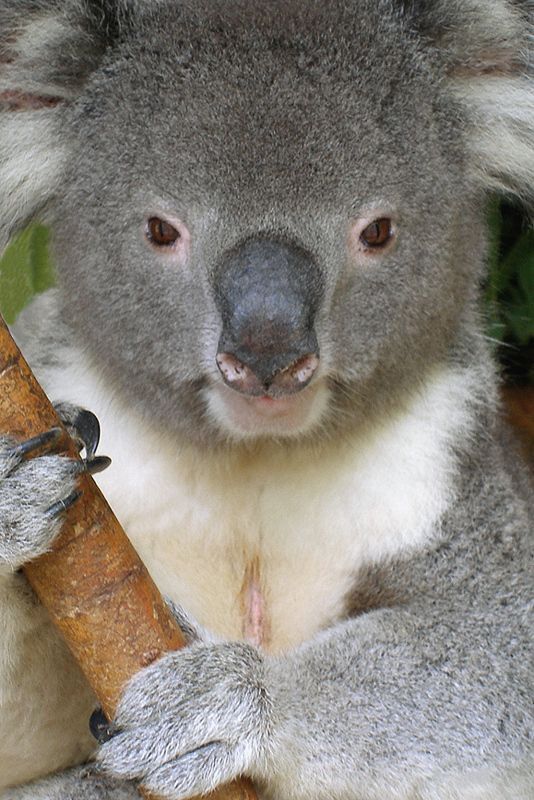
Scent gland on the chest of an adult male. Lone Pine Koala Sanctuary

Adult males communicate with loud bellows—"a long series of deep, snoring inhalations and belching exhalations". Because of their low frequency, these bellows can travel far through the forest. Koalas may bellow at any time, particularly during the breeding season, when it serves to attract females and possibly intimidate other males. They also bellow to advertise their presence when they change trees. These sounds signal and exaggerate the male's body size; females pay more attention to bellows by larger males. Female koalas bellow, though more softly, in addition to making snarls, wails, and screams. These calls are produced when in distress and when making defensive threats. Younger animals squeak and older ones squawk when distraught. When another individual climbs over it, a koala makes a low closed-mouth grunt. Koalas also communicate with facial expressions. When snarling, wailing, or squawking, the animal curls the upper lip and points its ears forward. Screaming koalas pull their lips and ears back. Females form an oval shape with their lips when annoyed.

Agonistic behaviour typically consists of quarrels between individuals who are trying to pass each other on a tree. This occasionally involves biting. Strangers may wrestle, chase, and bite. In extreme situations, a larger male may try to displace a smaller rival from a tree, chasing, cornering, and biting it. Once the individual is driven away, the victor bellows and marks the tree. Pregnant and lactating females are particularly aggressive and attack individuals who come too close. In general, however, koalas tend to avoid fighting due to energy costs.

=== Reproduction and development ===
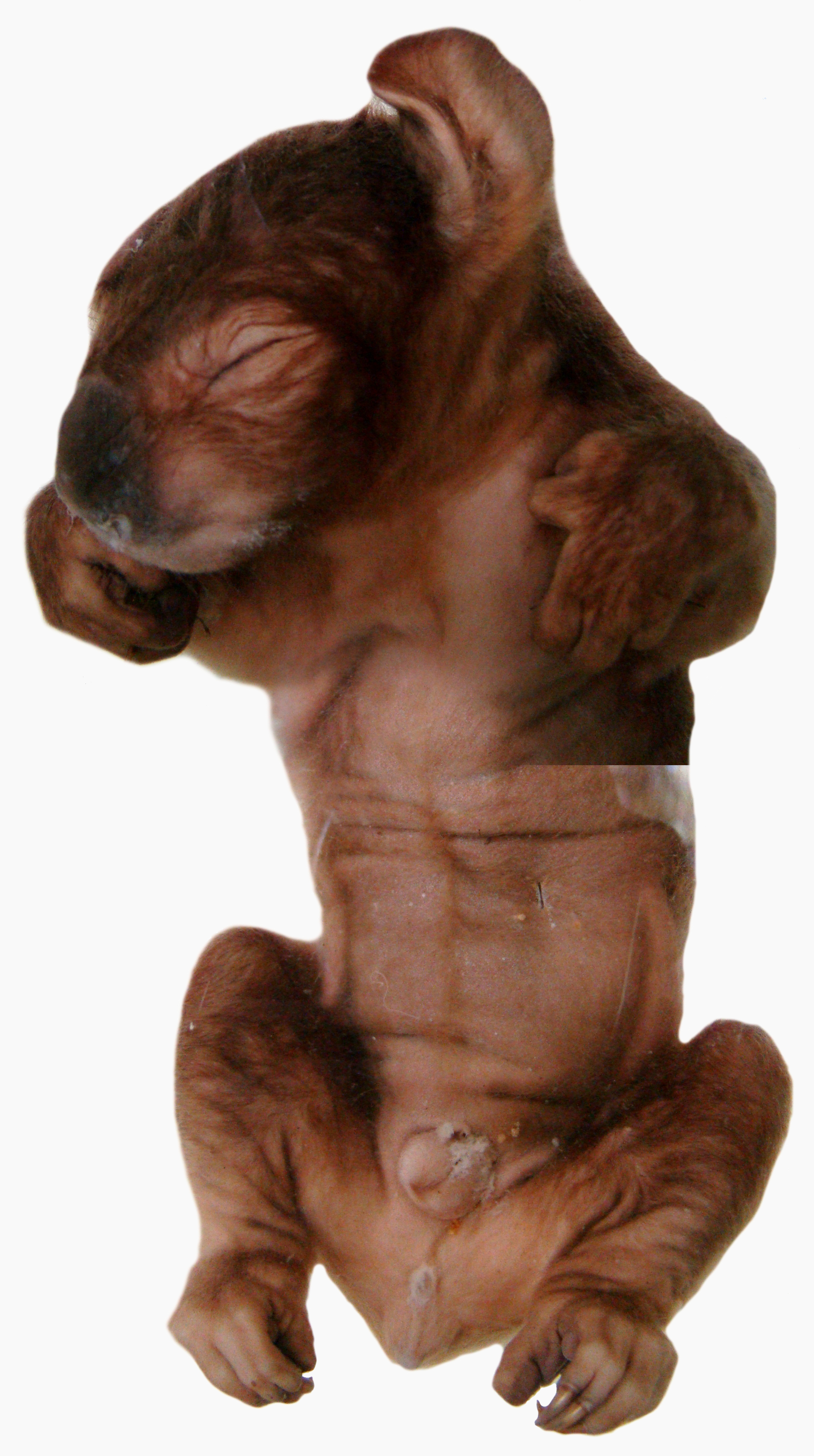
A young joey, preserved at Port Macquarie Koala Hospital

Koalas are seasonal breeders, and they give birth from October to May. Females in oestrus lean their heads back and shake their bodies. Despite these obvious signals, males try to copulate with any female during this period, mounting them from behind. Because of his much larger size, a male can overpower a female. A female may scream and vigorously fight off her suitors but will accede to one that is dominant or familiar. The commotion can attract other males to the scene, obliging the incumbent to delay mating and fight off the intruders. A female may learn who is more dominant during these fights. Older males typically accumulate scratches, scars, and cuts on the exposed parts of their noses and their eyelids.

Koalas are induced ovulators. The gestation period lasts 33–35 days, and a female gives birth to one joey or occasionally, twins. The young are born tiny and barely formed, weighing no more than 0.5 g (0.018 oz). However, their lips, forelimbs, and shoulders are relatively advanced, and they can breathe, defecate, and urinate. The joey crawls into its mother's pouch to continue its development. Female koalas do not clean their pouches, which is an unusual trait among marsupials.

The joey latches on to one of the female's two teats and suckles it. The female lactates for as long as a year to make up for her low energy production. Unlike in other marsupials, koala milk becomes less fatty as the joey grows. After seven weeks, the joey has a proportionally large head, clear edges around its face, more colouration, and a visible pouch (if female) or scrotum (male). At 13 weeks, the joey weighs around 50 g (1.8 oz), and its head doubles in size. The eyes begin to open and hair begins to appear. At 26 weeks, the fully furred animal resembles an adult and can look outside the pouch.

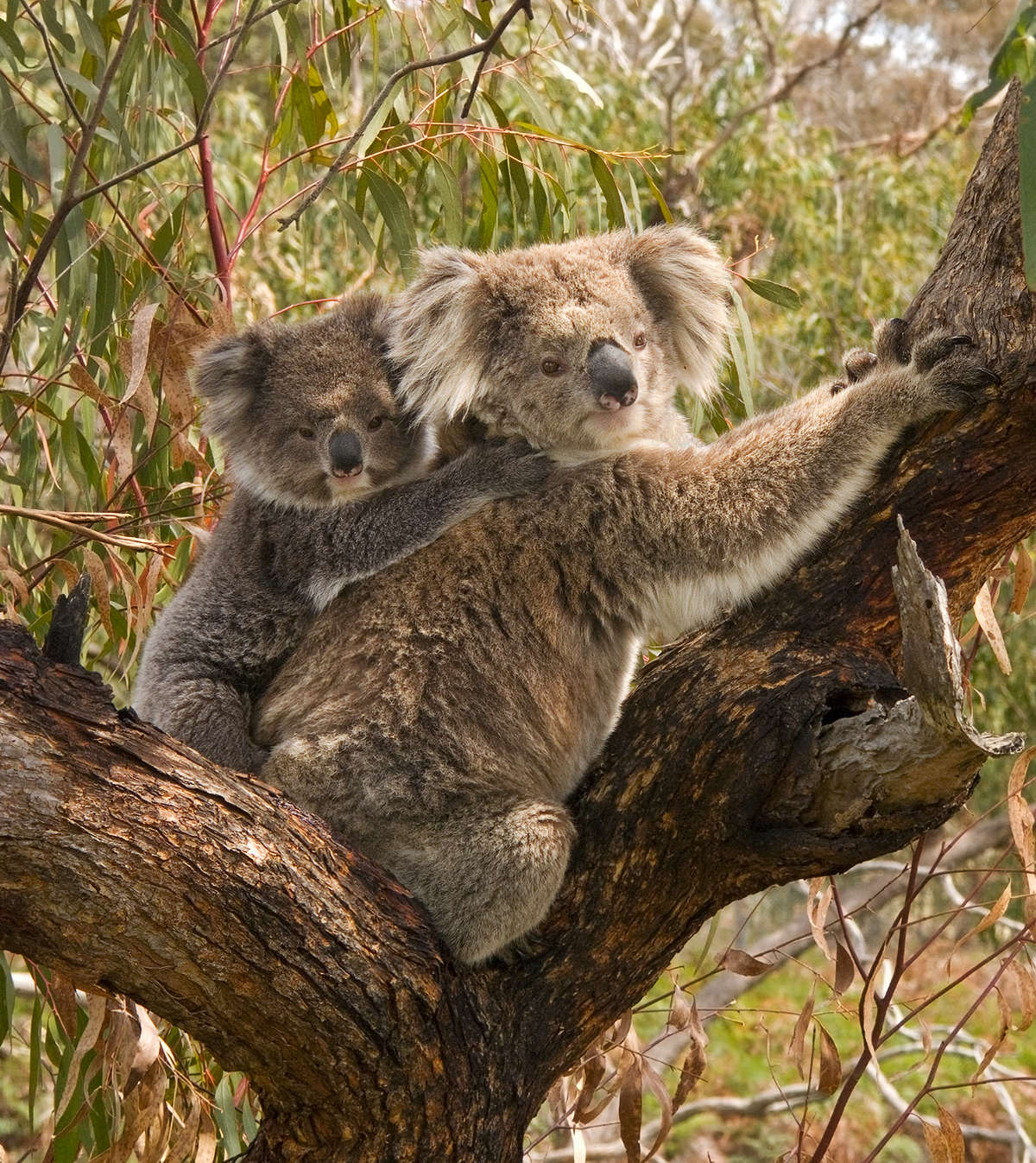
Mother with joey on back

At six or seven months, the joey weighs 300–500 g (11–18 oz) and fully emerges from the pouch for the first time. It explores its new surroundings cautiously, clutching its mother for support. Around this time, the mother prepares it for a eucalyptus diet by producing a faecal pap that the joey eats from her cloaca. This pap comes from the cecum, is more liquid than regular faeces, and is filled with bacteria. A nine month old joey has its adult coat colour and weighs 1 kg (2.2 lb). Having permanently left the pouch, it rides on its mother's back for transportation, learning to climb by grasping branches. Gradually, it becomes more independent. The mother becomes pregnant again after a year after the offspring reaches around 2.5 kg (5.5 lb). She permanently severs her bond with her previous offspring and no longer allows it to suckle, but it remains nearby until it is one-and-a-half to two years old.

Females become sexually mature at about three years of age; in comparison, males reach sexual maturity at about age four although they can experience spermatogenesis as early as two years. Males do not start marking their scent until they reach sexual maturity though their chest glands become functional much earlier. Koalas can breed every year if environmental conditions are good, though the long dependence of the young usually leads to year-long gaps in births.

=== Health and mortality ===
Koalas live from 13 to 18 years in the wild although males may die sooner because of their more risky lives. Koalas usually survive falls from trees, yet they can get hurt and even die, particularly inexperienced young and fighting males. Around age six, the koala's chewing teeth begin to wear down and their chewing efficiency decreases. Eventually, the cusps disappear completely and the animal dies of starvation. Koalas have few predators. Dingos, large pythons and some birds of prey may take them. Koalas are generally not subject to external parasites other than ticks around the coast. The mite Sarcoptes scabiei gives koalas mange, while the bacterium Mycobacterium ulcerans skin ulcers, but these are uncommon. Internal parasites are few and have little effect. These include the Bertiella obesa tapeworm, commonly found in the intestine, and the Marsupostrongylus longilarvatus and Durikainema phascolarcti nematodes, which are infrequently found in the lungs. In a three-year study of almost 600 koalas taken to the Australia Zoo Wildlife Hospital in Queensland, 73.8% of the animals were infected with parasitic protozoal genus Trypanosoma, the most frequent of which was T. irwini.

Koalas can be subject to pathogens such as Chlamydiaceae bacteria, which can cause keratoconjunctivitis, urinary tract infection, and reproductive tract infection. Such infections are common on the mainland, but absent in some island populations. As of 2024, efforts are underway to use vaccination to try to stem the koala chlamydia epidemic. The koala retrovirus (KoRV) may cause koala immune deficiency syndrome (KIDS) which is similar to AIDS in humans. Prevalence of KoRV in koala populations suggests it spread from north to south, for only southern populations have virus-free individuals. In 2026, genomic analysis of multi-generation captive koala populations identified inherited KoRV integrations associated with cancer risk and reproductive outcomes. The findings may inform captive breeding programs.

The animals are vulnerable to bushfires due to their slow speed and the flammability of eucalypt trees. The koala instinctively seeks refuge in the higher branches where it is vulnerable to heat and fire. Bushfires divide the animal's habitat, which isolates them, decreases their numbers, and creates genetic bottlenecks. Dehydration and overheating can prove fatal. Consequently, the koala is vulnerable to the effects of climate change. Models of climate change predict warmer and drier climates, suggesting that the koala's range will shrink in the east and south to more mesic habitats.

== Relation to humans ==
=== History ===
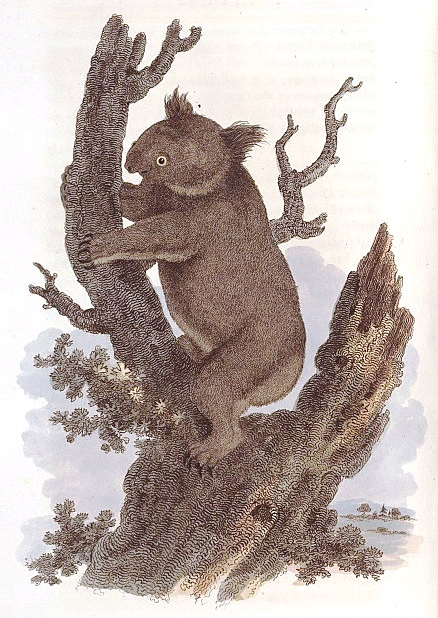
George Perry's illustration in his 1810 Arcana was the first published image of the koala.

The first written reference to the koala was recorded by John Price, servant of John Hunter, the Governor of New South Wales. Price encountered the "cullawine" on 26 January 1798, during an expedition to the Blue Mountains, but his remarks would first be published in Historical Records of Australia, nearly a century later. In 1802, French-born explorer Francis Louis Barrallier encountered the animal when his two Aboriginal guides, returning from a hunt, brought back two koala feet they were intending to eat. Barrallier preserved the appendages and sent them and his notes to Hunter's successor, Philip Gidley King, who forwarded them to Joseph Banks. Similar to Price, Barrallier's notes were not published until 1897. Reports of the "Koolah" appeared in the Sydney Gazette in late 1803, and helped provide the impetus for King to send artist John Lewin to create watercolours of the animal. Lewin painted three pictures, one of which was printed in Georges Cuvier's Le Règne Animal (The Animal Kingdom) (1827).

Botanist Robert Brown was the first to write a formal scientific description in 1803, based on a female specimen captured near what is now Mount Kembla in the Illawarra region of New South Wales. Austrian botanical illustrator Ferdinand Bauer drew the animal's skull, throat, feet, and paws. Brown's work remained unpublished and largely unnoticed, however; his field books and notes remained in his possession until his death, when they were bequeathed to the British Museum in London. They were not identified until 1994, while Bauer's koala watercolours were not published until 1989. William Paterson, who had befriended Brown and Bauer during their stay in New South Wales, wrote an eyewitness report of his encounters with the animals and this would be the basis for British surgeon Everard Home's anatomical writings on them. Home, who in 1808 published his report, coined the scientific name Didelphis coola.

George Perry officially published the first image of the koala in his 1810 natural history work Arcana. Perry called it the "New Holland Sloth", and his dislike for the koala, evident in his description of the animal, was reflected in the contemporary British attitudes towards Australian animals as strange and primitive:

... the eye is placed like that of the Sloth, very close to the mouth and nose, which gives it a clumsy awkward appearance, and void of elegance in the combination ... they have little either in their character or appearance to interest the Naturalist or Philosopher. As Nature however provides nothing in vain, we may suppose that even these torpid, senseless creatures are wisely intended to fill up one of the great links of the chain of animated nature ...

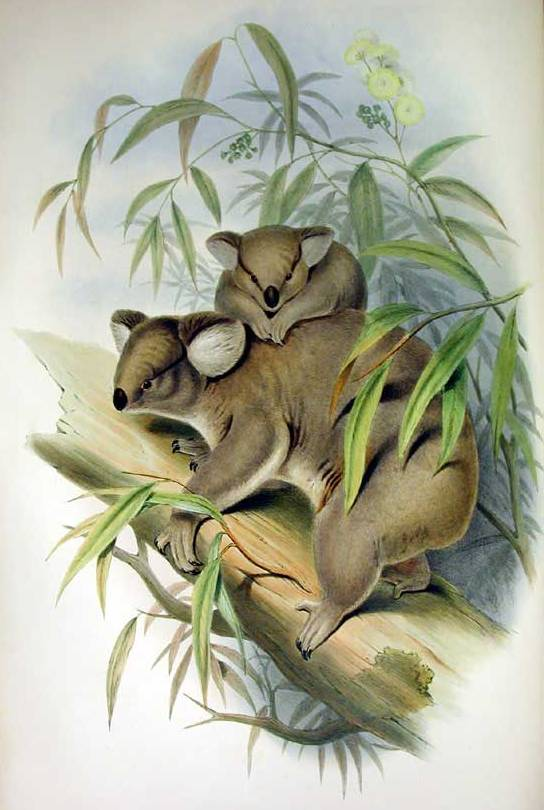
Natural history illustrator John Gould popularised the koala with his 1863 work The Mammals of Australia.

Naturalist and popular artist John Gould illustrated and described the koala in his three-volume work The Mammals of Australia (1845–1863) and introduced the species, as well as other members of Australia's little-known faunal community, to the public. Comparative anatomist Richard Owen, in a series of publications on the physiology and anatomy of Australian mammals, presented a paper on the anatomy of the koala to the Zoological Society of London. In this widely cited publication, he provided an early description of its internal anatomy, and noted its general structural similarity to the wombat. English naturalist George Robert Waterhouse, curator of the Zoological Society of London, was the first to correctly classify the koala as a marsupial in the 1840s, and compared it to fossil species Diprotodon and Nototherium, which had been discovered just recently. Similarly, Gerard Krefft, curator of the Australian Museum in Sydney, noted evolutionary mechanisms at work when comparing the koala to fossil marsupials in his 1871 The Mammals of Australia.

Britain received its first living koala in 1881, which was obtained by the Zoological Society of London. As related by prosecutor to the society, William Alexander Forbes, the animal suffered an accidental demise when the heavy lid of a washstand fell on it and it was unable to free itself. Forbes dissected the specimen and wrote about the female reproductive system, the brain, and the liver—parts not previously described by Owen, who had access only to preserved specimens. Scottish embryologist William Caldwell—well known in scientific circles for determining the reproductive mechanism of the platypus—described the uterine development of the koala in 1884, and used this new information to convincingly map out the evolutionary timeline of the koala and the monotremes.

=== Cultural significance ===
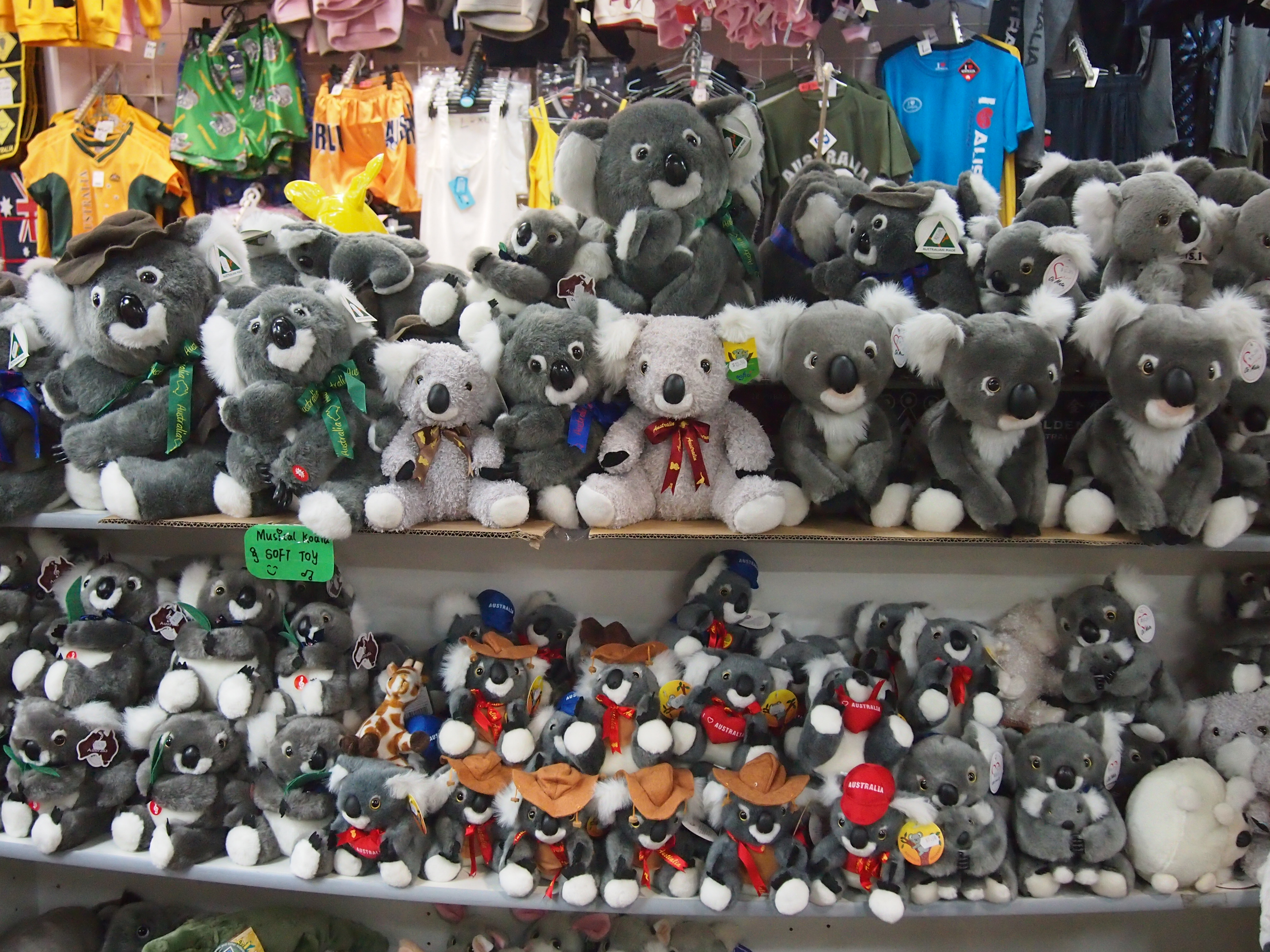
Koala souvenir soft toys are popular with tourists.

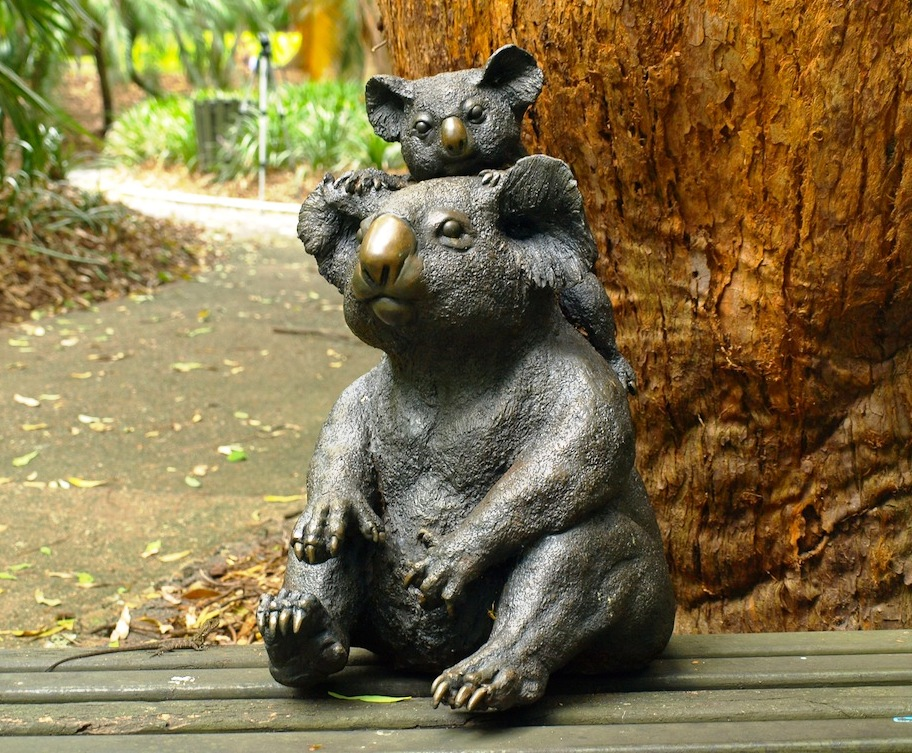
Amy and Oliver the bronze koalas (by Glenys Lindsay)

The koala is known worldwide and is a major draw for Australian zoos and wildlife parks. It has been featured in popular culture and as soft toys. It benefited the Australian tourism industry by over $1 billion in 1998, and subsequently grown. Its international popularly rose after World War II, when tourism increased and the animals were exported to zoos overseas. In 1997, about 75% of European and Japanese tourists placed the koala at the top of their list of animals to see. According to biologist Stephen Jackson: "If you were to take a straw poll of the animal most closely associated with Australia, it's a fair bet that the koala would come out marginally in front of the kangaroo". Factors that contribute to the koala's enduring popularity include its teddy bear-like appearance with childlike body proportions.

The koala features in the Dreamtime stories and mythology of Indigenous Australians. The Tharawal people believed that the animal helped them get to Australia by rowing the boat. Another myth tells of a tribe that killed a koala and used its long intestines to create a bridge for people from other parts of the world. How the koala lost its tail is the subject of many tales. In one, a kangaroo cuts it off to punish the koala for uncouth behaviour. Tribes in Queensland and Victoria regarded the koala as a wise animal that gave valuable guidance. Bidjara-speaking people credited the koala for making trees grow in their arid lands. The animal is depicted in rock carvings, though less so than some other species.

Early European settlers in Australia considered the koala to be a creeping sloth-like animal with a "fierce and menacing look". At the turn of the 20th century, the koala's reputation took a positive turn. It appears in Ethel Pedley's 1899 book Dot and the Kangaroo, as the "funny native bear". Artist Norman Lindsay depicted a more anthropomorphic koala in The Bulletin cartoons, starting in 1904. This character also appeared as Bunyip Bluegum in Lindsay's 1918 book The Magic Pudding. The most well known fictional koala is Blinky Bill. Created by Dorothy Wall in 1933, the character appeared in books, films, TV series, merchandise, and a 1986 environmental song by John Williamson. The koala first appeared on an Australian stamp in 1930.

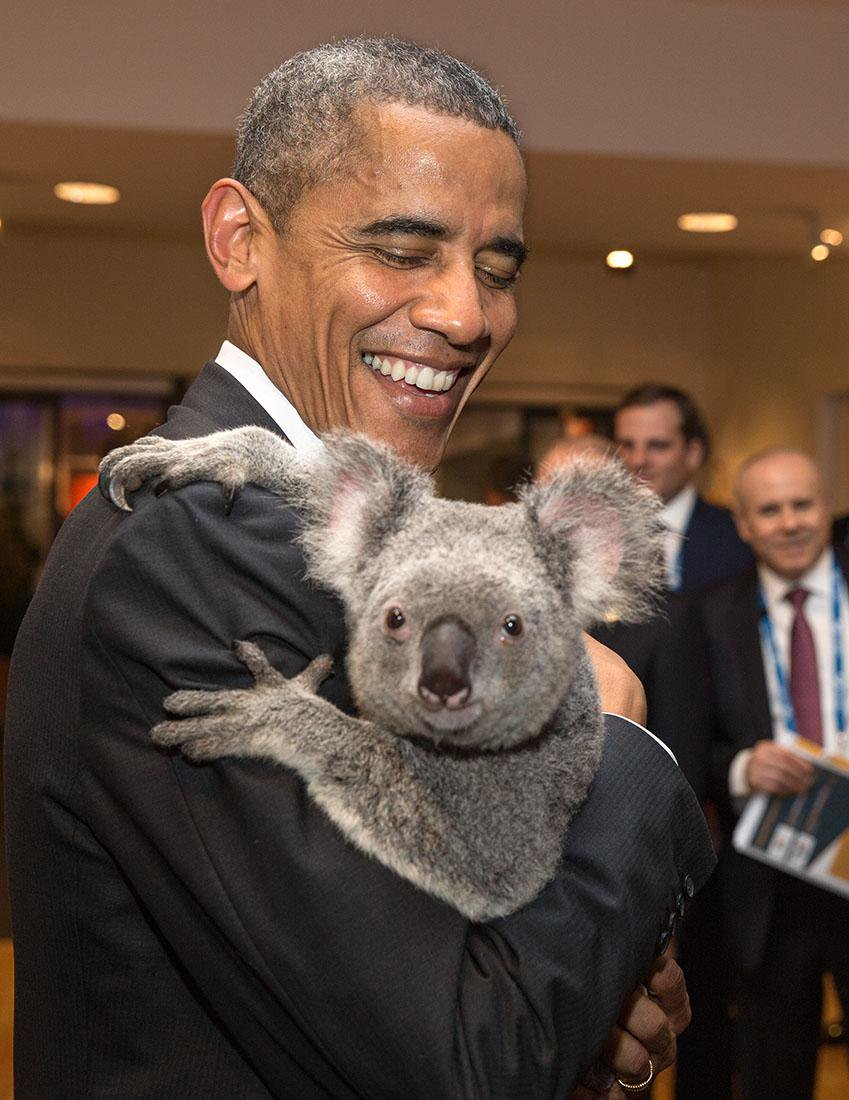
US President Barack Obama with a koala in Brisbane, Australia

The song "Ode to a Koala Bear" appears on the B-side of the 1983 Paul McCartney/Michael Jackson duet single "Say Say Say". A koala is the main character in animated cartoons in the early 1980s: Hanna-Barbera's The Kwicky Koala Show and Nippon Animation's Noozles. Food products shaped like the koala include the Caramello Koala chocolate bar and the bite-sized cookie snack Koala's March. Dadswells Bridge in Victoria features a tourist complex shaped like a giant koala and the Queensland Reds rugby team has a koala as its icon.

=== Koala diplomacy ===
Political leaders and members of royal families had their pictures taken with koalas, including Queen Elizabeth II, Prince Harry, Crown Prince Naruhito, Crown Princess Masako, Pope John Paul II, US President Bill Clinton, Soviet premier Mikhail Gorbachev and South African President Nelson Mandela At the 2014 G20 Brisbane summit, hosted by Prime Minister Tony Abbott, many world leaders, including Russian President Vladimir Putin and US President Barack Obama, were photographed holding koalas. The event gave rise to the term "koala diplomacy", which became the Oxford Word of the Month for December 2016. The term also includes the loan of koalas by the Australian government to overseas zoos in countries such as Singapore and Japan, as a form of "soft power diplomacy", like the "panda diplomacy" practised by China.

== Conservation ==
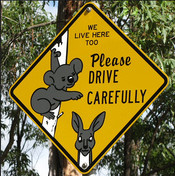
Road sign depicting a koala and a kangaroo

The koala was originally classified as Least Concern on the Red List, and reassessed as Vulnerable in 2014. In the Australian Capital Territory, New South Wales and Queensland, the species was listed under the EPBC Act in February 2022 as endangered by extinction. The described population was determined in 2012 to be "a species for the purposes of the EPBC Act 1999" in Federal legislation.

Australian policymakers declined a 2009 proposal to include the koala in the Environment Protection and Biodiversity Conservation Act 1999. A 2017 WWF report found a 53% decline per generation in Queensland, and a 26% decline in New South Wales. The Australian Government's Threatened Species Scientific Committee estimated that the 2021 koala population was 92,000, down from 185,000 two decades prior. The Australian Koala Foundation estimated in 2022 that there could be 43,000–100,000 koalas. The CSIRO's National Koala Monitoring Program has since used improved detection methods to give the dramatically higher estimate of 729,000–918,000 koalas in 2025. This compares with 8 to 10 million at the start of the 20th century.

However, as of 2026, the koala population in parts of South Australia and Victoria are over-abundant. In Victoria, they are over-grazing in Cape Otway and French Island. Numbers have been growing rapidly in the Mount Lofty Ranges near Adelaide in South Australia, which represents around 10 per cent of Australia's koala population and is projected to increase by 17–25 per cent over the next 25 years. A 2026 modelling study concluded that continued population growth could exceed local ecosystem carrying capacity and evaluated several management strategies, including fertility control, to maintain sustainable population levels. Numbers were abundant on Kangaroo Island (KI) at around 48,000, before the 2020 Kangaroo Island bushfires, and in 2026 estimated to number around 5-10,000. On this island, these koalas are not affected by chlamydophila pneumoniae, due to the isolation from other colonies. Koalas are not native to South Australia, having been exported to the Mount Lofty Ranges and KI from French Island in Victoria around 1920.

The koala was heavily hunted by European settlers in the early 20th century, largely for its fur. Australia exported as many as two million pelts by 1924. Between 1888 and 1927 roughly 8 million koalas were hunted for their pelts. Koala furs were used to make rugs, coat linings, muffs, and on women's garment trimmings. The first successful efforts at conserving the species were initiated by the establishment of Brisbane's Lone Pine Koala Sanctuary and Sydney's Koala Park Sanctuary in the 1920s and 1930s. Its owner Noel Burnet created the first successful breeding program.

One of the biggest anthropogenic threats to the koala is habitat destruction and fragmentation. Near the coast, the main cause of this is urbanisation, while in rural areas, habitat is cleared for agriculture. Its favoured trees are harvested for wood products. In 2000, Australia had the fifth highest rate of land clearance globally, stripping 564,800 hectares (1,396,000 acres) of native plants. The koalas' distribution has shrunk by more than 50% since European arrival, largely due to habitat fragmentation in Queensland. Nevertheless, koalas live in many protected areas.

While urbanisation can pose a threat to koala populations, the animals can survive in urban areas given enough trees. Urban populations have distinct vulnerabilities: collisions with vehicles and attacks by domestic dogs. Cars and dogs kill about 4,000 animals every year; together they account for two thirds of all koala deaths. To reduce road deaths, government agencies have been exploring various wildlife crossing options, such as the use of fencing to channel animals toward an underpass, in some cases adding a walkway to an existing culvert. Injured koalas are often taken to wildlife hospitals and rehabilitation centres. In a 30-year retrospective study performed at a New South Wales koala rehabilitation centre, trauma was found to be the most frequent cause of admission, followed by symptoms of Chlamydia infection.

== See also ==
- Drop bear – A predatory and dangerous version of the koala in popular folklore
- Fauna of Australia
- List of monotremes and marsupials of Australia
- Sam (koala), a female koala known for being rescued during the Black Saturday bushfires in 2009
