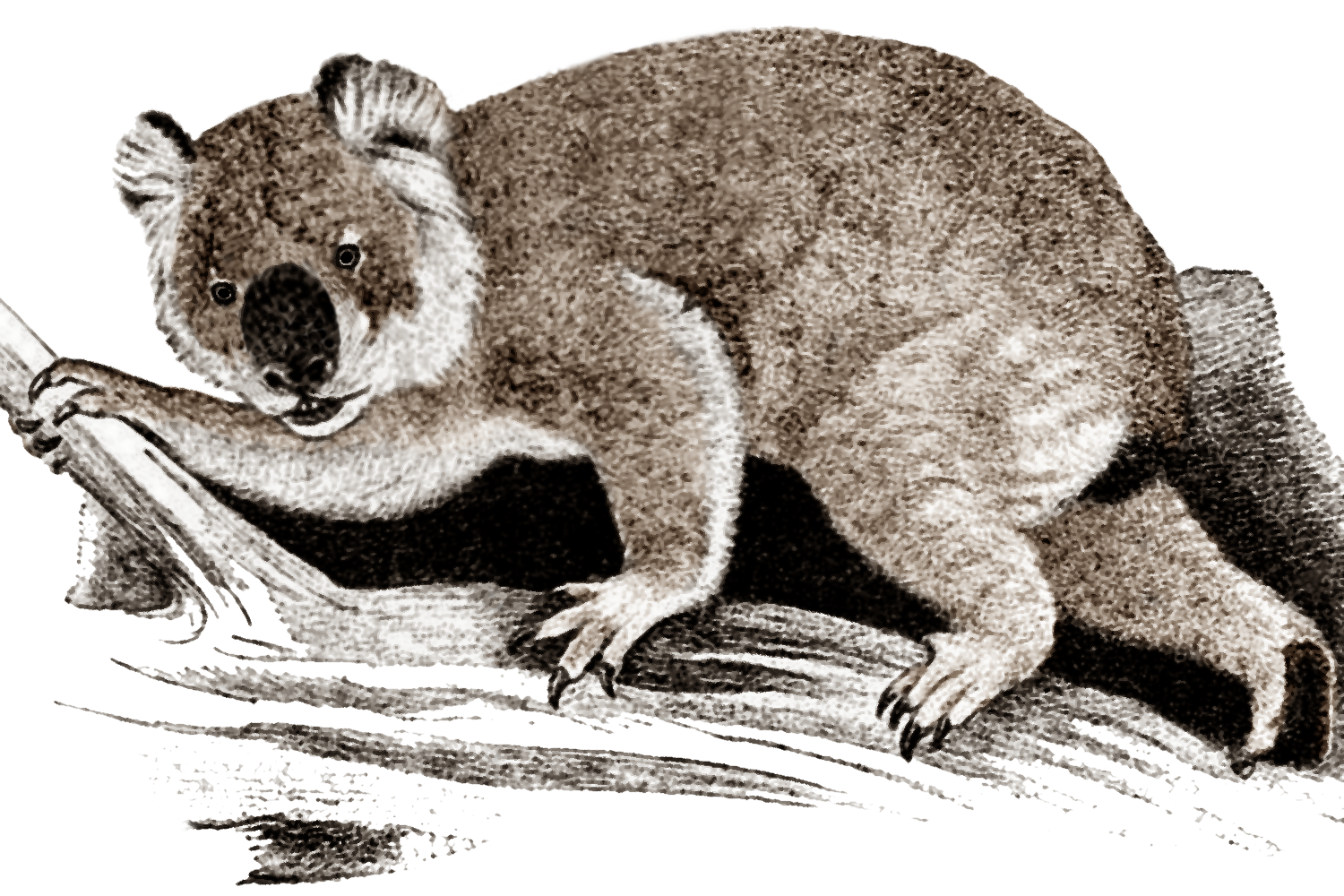
- Life restoration

Scientific classification
- Kingdom: Animalia
- Phylum: Chordata
- Class: Mammalia
- Infraclass: Marsupialia
- Order: Diprotodontia
- Family: Phascolarctidae
- Genus: Phascolarctos
- Species: †P. stirtoni

Binomial name
- †Phascolarctos stirtoni Bartholomai, 1968

= Giant koala =

Giant koala Temporal range: Late Pleistocene

Extinct species of marsupial

The giant koala (Phascolarctos stirtoni) is an extinct arboreal marsupial which existed in Australia during the Pleistocene epoch. Phascolarctos stirtoni was about one-third larger than the contemporary koala, P. cinereus, and has an estimated weight of 13 kg (29 lb), which is the same weight as a large contemporary male koala.

Although considered a part of the Australian megafauna, its body mass excludes it from most formal definitions of megafauna. It is better described as a more robust koala, rather than a "giant"; in contrast, a number of Australian megafauna, such as Diprotodon and Procoptodon, were unambiguously giants, even if not compared to their closest relatives.

The two koala species co-existed during the Pleistocene, occupying the same arboreal niche. The reason for the extinction of the larger of the two about 50,000 years ago is unknown, although there are various hypotheses for their extinction.

== Taxonomy ==
A description of the species was published by Alan Bartholomai in 1968, based on a partial maxilla with remains of teeth that was uncovered at the Cement Mills limestone quarry near Gore, Queensland. The material was determined to have occurred at a Pleistocene horizon of the site. The author assigned the species to the genus of the extant koala as Phascolarctos stirtoni, the specific epithet commemorates the American professor, R. A. Stirton, in recognition of his work on marsupial fossils.

== Description ==
The giant koala was an arboreal marsupial weighing about 13 kg, a little more than modern koalas. It is the largest known tree dwelling marsupial ever to have lived. Scientists say there is a clear similarity between the physical appearance of P. stirtoni and the modern koala. It is assumed that the giant koala was a folivore which was specialised to feed on eucalyptus leaves, like its extant relative.

== Extinction ==
Fossil remains of Phascolarctos stirtoni have been discovered in Lake Eyre and Lake Tarkarooloo basins in South Australia. It was once thought that the modern-day koala was descended from the giant koala, but this has now been determined to be incorrect. Gilbert Price, of the University of Queensland, used improved dating techniques to analyse fossils of both types of koala to find that the two species were living together in the same arboreal niche. It is unclear from what the koalas descend, and why one species survived while the other became extinct. It is hypothesized that a change in climate and a restriction of food supply caused P. stirtoni's extinction. Another possible reason is hunting by humans, particularly for larger animals like P. stirtoni. The "dwarfing" hypothesis, based on the similarities of the two koalas has been used to support both ideas.
