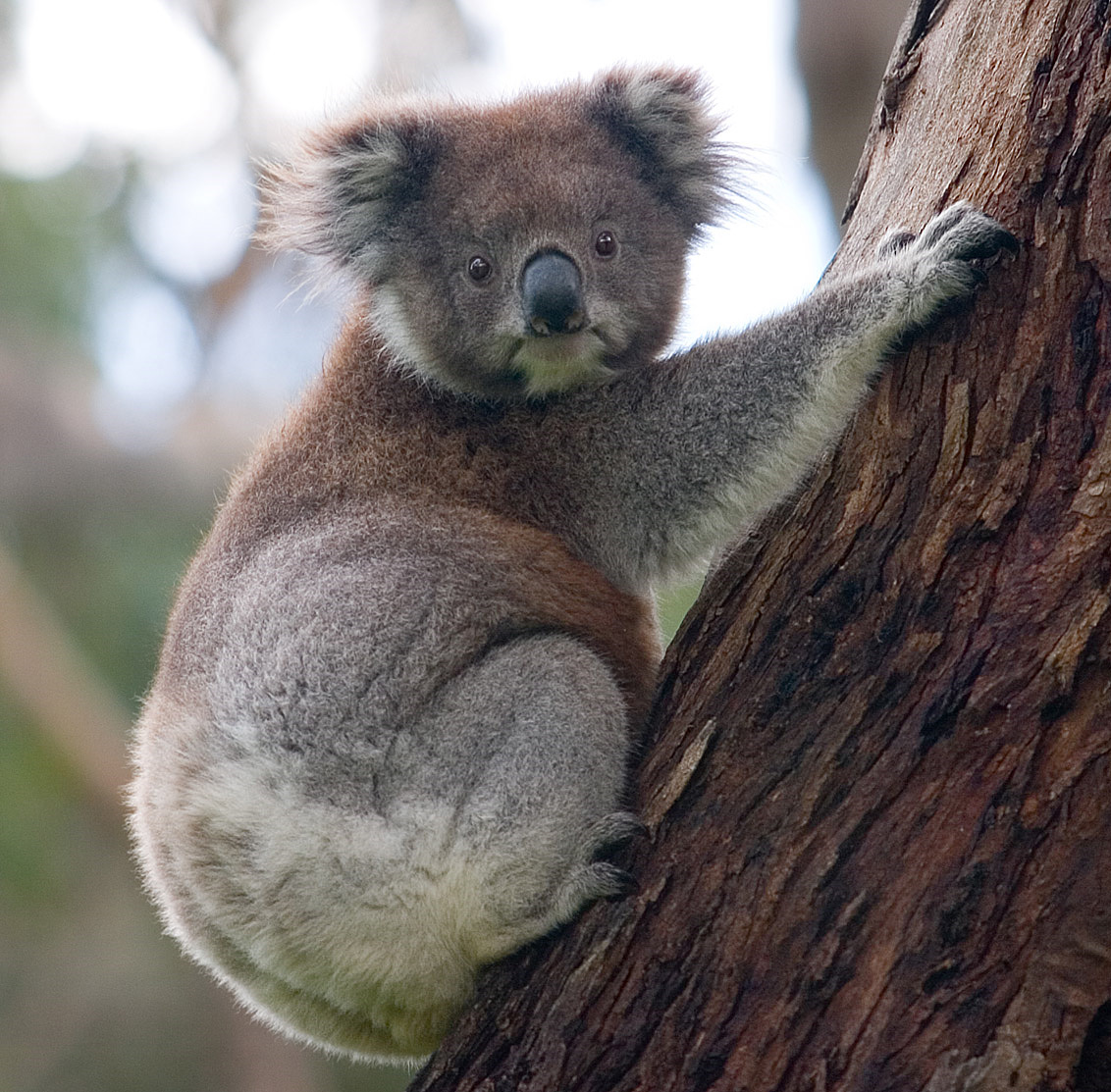
- Phascolarctos cinereus

Scientific classification
- Kingdom: Animalia
- Phylum: Chordata
- Class: Mammalia
- Infraclass: Marsupialia
- Order: Diprotodontia
- Suborder: Vombatiformes
- Infraorder: Phascolarctomorphia; Aplin & Archer, 1987
- Family: Phascolarctidae; Owen, 1839

Genera
- †Invictokoala; †Litokoala; †Lumakoala?; †Koobor; †Madakoala; †Nimiokoala; †Perikoala; †Priscakoala; †Stelakoala; Phascolarctos

= Phascolarctidae =

Phascolarctidae Temporal range: Late Oligocene–Recent

Family of marsupials

The Phascolarctidae (φάσκωλος (phaskolos) - pouch or bag, ἄρκτος (arktos) - bear, from the Greek phascolos + arctos meaning pouched bear) is a family of marsupials of the order Diprotodontia, consisting of only one extant species, the koala, and six well-known fossil species, with another six less well known fossil species, and two fossil species of the genus Koobor, whose taxonomy is debatable but are placed in this group. The closest relatives of the Phascolarctidae are the wombats, which comprise the family Vombatidae.

The fossil record of the family dates back to the Middle Miocene or Late Oligocene.

== Classification ==
Family Phascolarctidae

- Genus †Nimiokoala
  - †Nimiokoala greystanesi
- Genus †Invictokoala
  - †Invictokoala monticola
- Genus †Madakoala
  - †Madakoala robustus
  - †Madakoala wellsi
  - †Madakoala devisi
- Genus †Litokoala
  - †Litokoala garyjohnstoni
  - †Litokoala kutjamarpensis
  - †Litokoala kanunkaensis
- Genus †Lumakoala
  - †Lumakoala blackae
- Genus †Koobor
  - †Koobor jimbarrati
  - †Koobor notabilis
- Genus †Perikoala
  - †Perikoala palankarinnica
  - †Perikoala robustus
- Genus Phascolarctos
  - †Phascolarctos maris
  - Koala - Phascolarctos cinereus
  - †Giant koala - Phascolarctos stirtoni
  - †Phascolarctos yorkensis (formerly Cundokoala yorkensis)
- Genus †Priscakoala
  - †Priscakoala lucyturnbullae
- Genus †Stelakoala
  - †Stelakoala riversleighensis
