= Marsupostrongylus longilarvatus =

Scientific classification
- Kingdom: Animalia
- Phylum: Nematoda
- Class: Chromadorea
- Order: Rhabditida
- Family: Angiostrongylidae
- Genus: Marsupostrongylus
- Species: M. longilarvatus

Binomial name
- Marsupostrongylus longilarvatus Spratt, 1979

Species of roundworm

Marsupostrongylus longilarvatus is a metastrongyl (lung-worm) found in various marsupials. It was described as new to science by D.M. Spratt in 1979 from a swamp wallaby in New South Wales.
