= William Hay Caldwell =

Scottish zoologist

William Hay Caldwell (1859 – 28 August 1941) was a Scottish zoologist. Attending Cambridge University, he was the first recipient of a studentship founded in honour of his supervisor Francis Maitland Balfour, who died in a climbing accident in 1882. Two years after graduating from Cambridge in 1880, Caldwell was appointed Demonstrator in Comparative Anatomy, working for Professor Alfred Newton. In 1884, Caldwell used his studentship, which consisted of "£200 studentship, a £500 grant, the prestige and backing of the Royal Society, and letters of introduction from Newton to travel to Australia" to investigate whether the platypus laid eggs. With the assistance of the local Aboriginals, Caldwell set up camp on the banks of the Burnett River in northern Queensland, hunting for lungfish, echidna, and platypus eggs. After extensive searching assisted by a team of 150 Aboriginals, he discovered a few eggs. Mindful of the high cost per word, Caldwell tersely and now famously wired the British Association for the Advancement of Science meeting in Montreal: "Monotremes oviparous, ovum meroblastic". That is, monotremes lay eggs, and the eggs are similar to those of reptiles in that only part of the egg divides as it develops. Caldwell stayed away from the beginning stages of Darwinism and wanted to study evolutionary patterns himself. He believed that patterns of individual development could assist in developing and understanding the process of evolution. Platypus and echidna specimens collected by him were stored, but not catalogued, in the Cambridge University Museum of Zoology until they were rediscovered in 2022.
