= Perikoala =

Perikoala Temporal range: Late Oligocene

Scientific classification
- Kingdom: Animalia
- Phylum: Chordata
- Class: Mammalia
- Infraclass: Marsupialia
- Order: Diprotodontia
- Family: Phascolarctidae
- Genus: †Perikoala; Stirton, 1957

Extinct genus of marsupials

Perikoala is an extinct genus of marsupials, related to the modern koala. The genus diverged from a common ancestor of the other koala genera Nimiokoala, Litokoala, and Phascolarctos, which contains the living koala.

Two species are recognised:

- Perikoala palankarinnica Stirton 1957
- Perikoala robustus Woodburne et al. 1987
