= Muspiceida =

Scientific classification
- Domain: Eukaryota
- Kingdom: Animalia
- Phylum: Nematoda
- Class: Enoplea
- Order: Muspiceida

Order of roundworms

Muspiceida is an order of nematodes belonging to the class Enoplea.

Families:

- Muspiceidae Brumpt, 1920
- Robertdollfusiidae Chabaud & Campana, 1950
