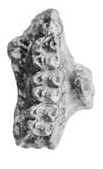
- Maxilla of Koobor notabilis

Scientific classification
- Kingdom: Animalia
- Phylum: Chordata
- Class: Mammalia
- Infraclass: Marsupialia
- Order: Diprotodontia
- Family: Phascolarctidae
- Genus: †Koobor; Archer, Wade, 1976

Species
- † Koobor jimbarratti; † Koobor notabilis

= Koobor =

Genus of extinct phascolarctid marsupials

Koobor is an extinct genus of extinct phascolarctid marsupials. The genus contains two species: Koobor jimbarratti and Koobor notabillis.
