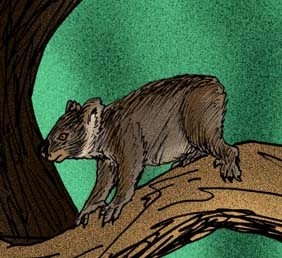
- Artist's reconstruction

Scientific classification
- Kingdom: Animalia
- Phylum: Chordata
- Class: Mammalia
- Infraclass: Marsupialia
- Order: Diprotodontia
- Family: Phascolarctidae
- Genus: †Litokoala; Stirton, Tedford & Woodburne, 1967.

Species
- L. dicktedfordi Pledge, 2010; L. garyjohnstoni Louys et al., 2007; L. kutjamarpensis (type species) Stirton et al., 1967; L. kanunkaensis Springer, 1987; L. thurmerae Pledge, 2010; L. dicksmithiBlack, Louys & Price 2013

= Litokoala =

Litokoala Temporal range: 16–10 Ma

Extinct genus of marsupials

Litokoala is an extinct genus of marsupials, and along with Nimiokoala, is closely related to the modern koala. The three genera may have diverged at an earlier date, although the drying of the continent and the expansion of Eucalyptus forests towards the late Miocene may have delayed the evolution of cranial features unique to the modern genera. This indicates that either fossil genus could be an ancestor of the modern genus, or the modern genus has a common ancestor to both. More material needs collection to improve their taxonomical relationships.

The genus lived around 16–10 million years ago in the middle Miocene Riversleigh of Queensland, Australia. This area is described as a rainforest habitat at time of sediment deposition. It had a different diet to the modern species, with the dental symphysis unfused, indicating a diet that was properly varied in nature, unlike the specialised nature of Phascolarctos. The size is estimated to be only half of the modern genus. Cranial adaptations are intermediate between the extant common brushtail possum and koala, with minor divergence from either.

This genus and Nimiokoala are similar in most anatomical features so far as is known, except Litokoala possessed a superficial messateric process, while Nimiokoala had "more marked basiooccipital-basisphenoid flexion and a more extensive posterior attachment of the pterygoid", which make these features basal in their taxonomical position in relation to the Phascolarctos. The basiocranial (back of skull) features are similar to Phascolarctos, while anterior (facial) features exhibit similarities with the genus Trichosurus. Only partial fragments are known, with only the posterior section of the zygomatic process known from the L. kutjamarpensis skull.
