= Nimiokoala =

Nimiokoala Temporal range: Early Miocene–Middle Miocene

Scientific classification
- Kingdom: Animalia
- Phylum: Chordata
- Class: Mammalia
- Infraclass: Marsupialia
- Order: Diprotodontia
- Family: Phascolarctidae
- Genus: †Nimiokoala; Black and Archer, 1997
- Species: †N. greystanesi

Binomial name
- †Nimiokoala greystanesi Black and Archer, 1997

Extinct species of marsupial

Nimiokoala greystanesi is an extinct marsupial, closely related to the extant koala, that inhabited northwestern Queensland in the Early and Middle subepochs of the Miocene (23–16 million years ago). It is the only species assigned to the genus Nimiokoala. Along with species of sister genus Litokoala, it is the smallest representative of family Phascolarctidae. Based on cladistic analysis, Nimiokoala is one of the more basal genera of Phascolarctidae. It died out due to climate change rendering the environment more arid. It probably had a more generalized diet than that of the modern species, but its exact food preferences are unknown.

== Etymology ==
The generic name, Nimiokoala, is derived from the Latin word Nimio "excessive" referring to its complex molar morphology relative to other koala species. The specific name, greystanesi, honors Greystanes High School.

== History of research ==
As of 2013, the fossil record of extinct koalas consists of 163 specimens across 58 deposits in Riversleigh; 55 specimens are attributed to N. greystanesi. To date, a partial skull has been found along with several lower jaws and isolated teeth. On the basis of these fossils, the dental apparatus of the animal has been completely restored. The species was named in 1997 with Queensland Museum specimen "QMF30482" being designated the holotype; with the specimens used by the type description being part of the Queensland Museum collections.

== Description ==
In the absence of postcranial fossils, the size of Nimiokoala has been estimated from measurements of its surviving teeth. It is estimated to have body length of about 25–30 cm (9.8-11.8 in), and a weight of about 3.5 kg (7.7 lb), one third the size of modern koalas and more than 10 times smaller than the largest known representative of Phascolarctidae (Phascolarctos yorkensis). Its muzzle was more prominent than that of modern koalas, resembling the possum snout. The teeth of the Riversleigh rainforest koala are selenodontal (crescent-shaped), with a numerous cusps and accessory shearing blades. The fossilized skull contains large orbits and very large auditory bulliae relative to its size.

== Ecology and behavior ==
In the early-middle Miocene, Riversleigh was covered with tropical forests. More open areas, with karst soil, occurred at forest edges or freshwater streams and lakes. As the climate became more arid, with a more pronounced change of seasons, small species of koalas died out, including the Riversleigh rainforest koala.

The small size of Nimiokoala, which requires a proportionately more intensive diet, and large eye sockets, which indicate good night vision, suggest that this animal was much more mobile than the modern koala. The structure of the ear of Nimikoala corresponds to that which can be observed in modern koalas; in conjunction with the large auditory bulliae, it can be concluded that the Riversleigh rainforest koala was sensitive to and used low-frequency sounds for communication, including to attract mates.

== Works cited ==
- Black, K. & Archer, M. (1997). "Nimiokoala gen. nov. (Marsupialia, Phascolarctidae) from Riversleigh, northwestern Queensland, with a revision of Litokoala". Memoirs of the Queensland Museum. 41 (2): 209–228. ISSN 0079-8835.
- Black, Karen H.; Louys, Julien & Price, Gilbert J. (2014). "Understanding morphological variation in the extant koala as a framework for identification of species boundaries in extinct koalas (Phascolarctidae; Marsupialia)". Journal of Systematic Palaeontology. 12 (2): 237–264. Bibcode:2014JSPal..12..237B. doi:10.1080/14772019.2013.768304. hdl:1959.4/unsworks_36979.
- Black, Karen H.; Price, Gilbert J.; Archer, Michael & Hand, Suzanne J. (2014). "Bearing up well? Understanding the past, present and future of Australia's koalas". Gondwana Research. 25 (3): 1186–1201. Bibcode:2014GondR..25.1186B. doi:10.1016/j.gr.2013.12.008. hdl:1959.4/unsworks_36967. ISSN 1342-937X.
- Gaffney, Dan (21 December 2009). "Loud and lazy but didn't chew gum: Ancient koalas". UNSW Science for society. Archived from the original on 2 October 2016.
- Musser, Anne (15 July 2009). "Nimiokoala greystanesi". Australian Museum. Archived from the original on 9 April 2017.
- Smith, Deborah (29 May 2013). "Discovery: 20 million year old extinct koala species". UNSW Science for society. Archived from the original on 2 October 2016.
