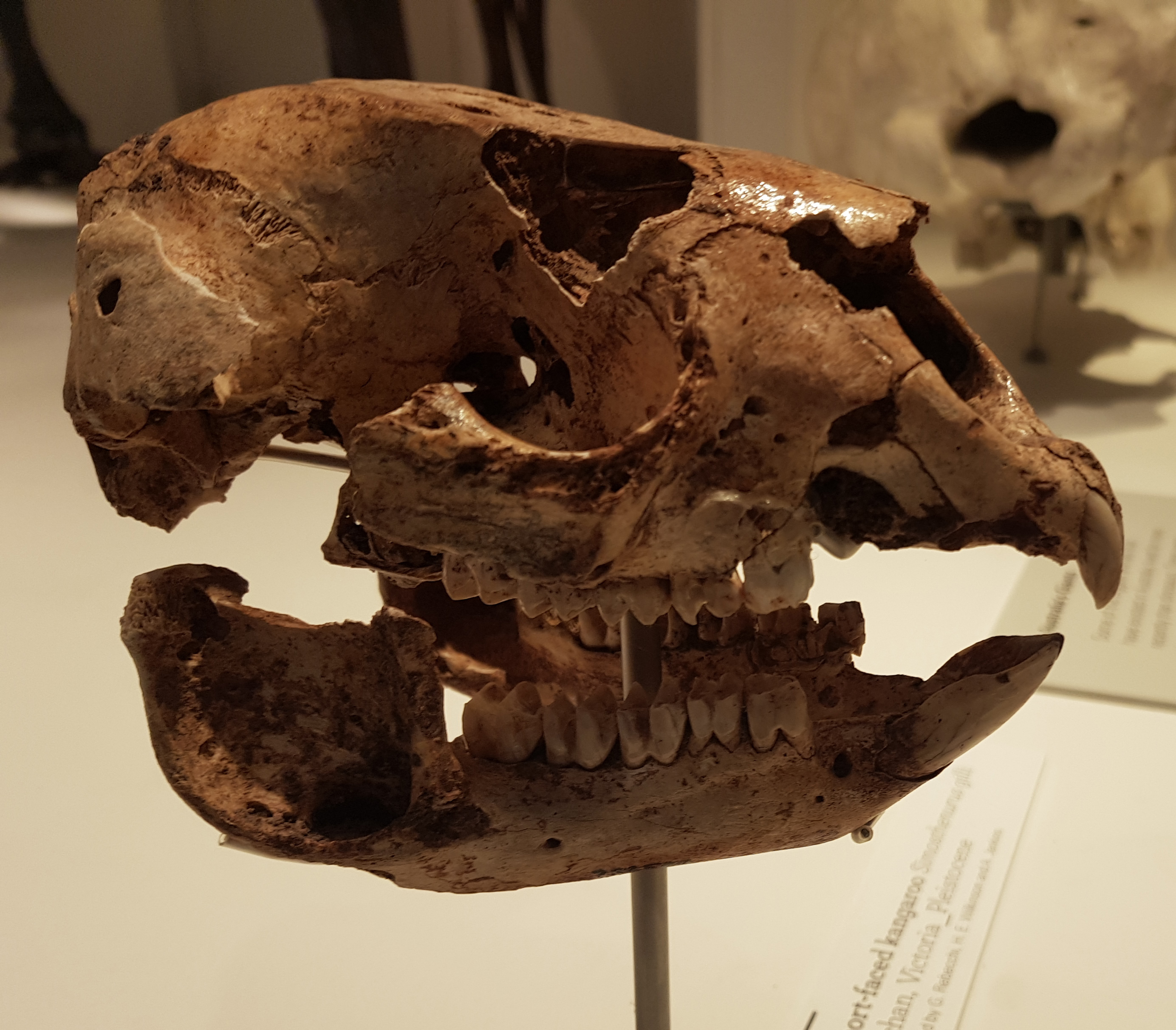
- Procoptodon gilli skull.

Scientific classification
- Kingdom: Animalia
- Phylum: Chordata
- Class: Mammalia
- Infraclass: Marsupialia
- Order: Diprotodontia
- Family: Macropodidae
- Subfamily: †Sthenurinae
- Genus: †Procoptodon; Owen, 1873

Type species
- Macropus goliah Owen, 1845

Species
- P. goliah (Owen, 1845); P. pusio Owen, 1874; P. rapha Owen, 1874; P? browneorum (Merrilees, 1968); P? gilli (Merrilees, 1968); P? mccoyi (Turnbull, Lundelius & Tedford, 1992); P? oreas (De Vis, 1895); P? williamsi Prideaux, 2004

= Procoptodon =

Procoptodon Temporal range: Pleistocene

Extinct genus of marsupials

Procoptodon is an extinct genus of giant short-faced (sthenurine) kangaroos that lived in Australia during the Pleistocene Epoch. P. goliah, the largest known kangaroo species that ever existed, stood at about 2 m (6.6 ft). They weighed about 200–240 kg (440–530 lb). Other members of the genus were smaller, however; Procoptodon gilli was the smallest of all of the sthenurine kangaroos, standing approximately 1 m (3 ft 3 in) tall.

The genus is derived from Simosthenurus, making the latter genus paraphyletic.

== Description ==
Procoptodon physiology was likely similar to that of the contemporary kangaroos; however, Procoptodon goliah was characterised by its large size. These sthenurines, or short-faced kangaroos, included species that were more than three times the size of the largest kangaroos living today. The largest, P. goliah, was 2.7 m (8 ft 10 in) tall and weighed up to 240 kg (530 lb). These animals lived alongside modern species of kangaroos, but specialised on a diet of leaves from trees and shrubs. Procoptodon were large and short-faced, distinguishable by their flat faces and forward-pointing eyes. On each foot, they had a single large toe or claw, similar in appearance to a horse's hoof. On feet, Procoptodon would have moved quickly through the open forests and plains, where they sought grass and leaves to eat. Both two of their front paws had two extra long fingers with large claws. These long claws may have been used to grab branches, and bring leaves to a distance where the animal could eat them.

== Distribution and habitat ==
Procoptodon is mainly known for living in semiarid areas of South Australia and New South Wales. These environments were harsh, characterised by vast areas of treeless, wind-blown sand dunes. However, the area around Lake Menindee, in western New South Wales, had a cooler, wetter climate at the time Procoptodon existed. The surrounding area was a mosaic of sclerophyll forest, woodland, savannah, and plains, but sand dunes would have also formed along the edges of the Menindee. Fossilized footprints have also been found on Kangaroo Island.

== Palaeobiology ==
=== Mobility ===
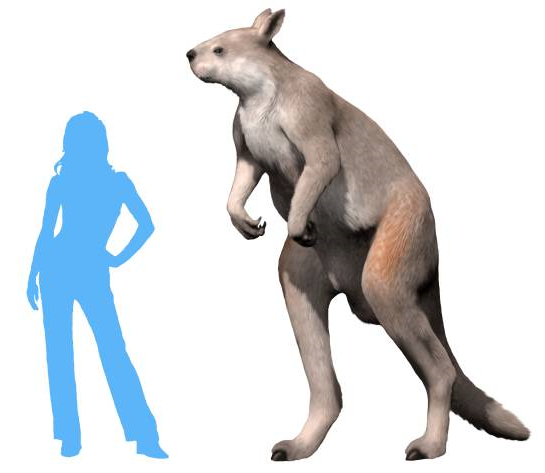
Life restoration of a bipedal P. goliah compared to human

Procoptodon was not able to hop as a mode of transportation, and would have been unable to accelerate sufficiently due to its weight. Broad hips and ankle joints, adapted to resist torsion or twisting, point to an upright posture where weight is supported by one leg at a time. Its broad hips also allowed for another important modification – large buttocks – a feature shared with other walking species.

However, some ambiguity surrounds the possible locomotion of P. goliah. Some research suggests that this species was perhaps the largest hopping mammal to have ever existed. Research suggests that the most optimal weight for a large hopping marsupial is roughly 50–60 kg. Larger animals, especially the massive P. goliah, would be substantially more at risk of tendon breakage while hopping. If P. goliah were to have travelled by hopping, the highest possible balance between size and speed would have been peaked, because its body would have been the largest possible to be carried by this method of locomotion.

A more likely suggestion, based on the apparent anatomy allowed by the bone structure of P. goliah, is that unlike modern kangaroos, which are plantigrade hoppers at high speeds and use their tails in pentapedal locomotion at slower speeds, Procoptodon was an unguligrade biped, walking in a fashion similar to hominids. Locomotion mechanics and physiology have been investigated through the examination of musculoskeletal scaling patterns. The largest, P. goliah, was 2.7 m (8 ft 10 in) tall and weighed up to 240 kg (530 lb). For P. goliah, tendon stress was identified, which indicates limited locomotor capabilities, exposing a correlation between body mass and locomotion abilities. Ruptures in tendons demonstrate strain in elasticity of muscles in the limbs, which provides evidence that perhaps the hypothesised ability for P. goliah to hop may have been unlikely. Due to its locomotive performance, the species may have been vulnerable to human predation.

A 2026 study on sthenurine kangaroos including Procoptodon showed that they had fourth metatarsals with safety factors higher than those of modern kangaroos; potentially a load-bearing adaptation. In addition, the calcaneum was capable of accommodating robust gastrocnemius tendons, indicating that hopping was mechanically possible for giant kangaroos. If Procoptodon was capable of hopping, it may have used this method of locomotion along with bipedal walking.

Fossils of giant short-faced kangaroos have been found at the Naracoorte World Heritage fossil deposits in South Australia, Lake Menindee in New South Wales, the Darling Downs in Queensland, and at many other sites. A full-sized, lifelike replica is on permanent display with other ancient native Australian animals at the Australian Museum.

==== Diet and molar patterns ====
These animals lived alongside modern species of kangaroos, but specialised on a diet of leaves from trees and shrubs. Their robust skull architecture and shortened faces have been thought to be related to increased masseter muscles used to chew foods. Similar to Macropus giganteus, Procoptodon has molar patterns that indicate they had a similar, grassy, herbivorous diet (as opposed to leaves) and were grazers, but determining specific diets and preference of extinct herbivores is admittedly difficult. Enamel bioapatite δ^{44/42}Ca measurements indicate that dicots featured very heavily in the diet of Procoptodon.

Dental microwear of P. goliah supports a browsing diet. Large bicuspids, crenulated dental crowns, and a massive bony jaw present in the fossil evidence of P. goliah would have been required to process and digest a substantial amount of leafy fodder. Stable isotopic data suggest its diet consisted of plants using a C_{4} photosynthetic pathway, typically associated with grasses. In this case, however, chenopod saltbushes found throughout semiarid Australia were considered a more likely source of the C_{4} signature. An intensification in aridity during the second half of the Pleistocene propagated the evolutionary progression of P. goliah to adapt to an abundance of dry vegetation. Evidence that P. goliah was the most widely distributed species among the Pleistocene macropodids throughout the continent shows that this species was adapted to a tougher diet than any other extinct Pleistocene sthenurine. Through the study of isotopic composition of P. goliah tooth enamel, in addition to biomechanical bone features, dietary clues and feeding behavior have been deduced. The osteological characters furnish evidence of P. goliah's ability to handle fibrous vegetables and salt consumption. This, in turn, leads to the belief that the species needed to be close to a water source to deal with salt intake; at the same time, though, some theories are beginning to arise that limb remains indicate the ability to travel distances both to and from water sources. The dental microwear of P. gilli and P. browneorum are very similar and are both indicative of a highly generalised diet.

== Extinction ==
The genus was present until at least about 45,000 years ago before going extinct, although some evidence indicates it may have survived to as recently as 18,000 years ago. Its extinction may have been due to climate shifts during the Pleistocene, or to human hunting. Those who support the hypothesis of a human-mediated extinction process cite that the arrival of humans to continental Australia occurred around the same time as the disappearance of this species. More evidence that this extinction was facilitated by human interaction is that the time period in which the extinction occurred was characterised by a relatively stable climate. However, no evidence of predation on or consumption of P. goliah by humans has been found in the fossil record.

Some researchers have speculated that the replacement of nutritious, fire-sensitive plants with less flammable, less nutritious flora brought about by human, fire-based deforestation in Australia played a large role in P. goliah and other Australian megafaunal extinctions about 50 thousand years ago (kya). However, the diet of P. goliah, primarily chenopods and Atriplex in particular, were less flammable and remained largely unaffected by fire. These diet patterns disprove theories that P. goliah's extinction was due in large part to a reduction in food supply from fire. At the same time, because of the kangaroos' elongated breeding cycles, their ability to increase population numbers after human predation was highly limited.

=== Environmental factors ===
Kangaroos living in dry, arid environments have been shown to exhibit higher densities of tooth enamel, caused by indirect hydration through consuming herbaceous plants. Lower levels of this enamel in P. goliah teeth found in areas with similar environmental parameters compared to the modern grazing kangaroos suggests that it relied far more heavily on free-standing water sources such as lakes and streams.

Given the larger size of P. goliah and its tendency to favor larger, free-standing water sources, episodic droughts accumulating 55 kya in the southern interior region of Australia would have certainly affected its populations. Yet, records show that such droughts had characterised this region for the previous 7 million years, with P. goliah surviving multiple intensely dry episodes during this period. Any period of significant decreases in rainfall did not occur until 5,000–10,000 years after the approximate extinction of P. goliah 45–50 kya, 20 ky before the last glacial maximum of high aridity. These factors disprove speculations that such droughts could have played a significant role in the extinction of P. goliah.

Some evidence supports both of the claims that the extinction of P. goliah may have been due to climate shifts during the Pleistocene or to human hunting. P. goliah, depending heavily on free-standing water, was more vulnerable to drought. This can explain why the red kangaroo survived the increasing aridity and P. goliah did not. However, there is also evidence that suggests that humans could have a significant influence in the extinction of P. goliah. P. goliah's need for a constant free-standing source of water, plus its height and common habitat in open shrublands, made it more noticeable to human hunters, thus making it vulnerable to humans, who were also water-bound like it was.
