= Australian megafauna =

Large animals in Australia, past and present era

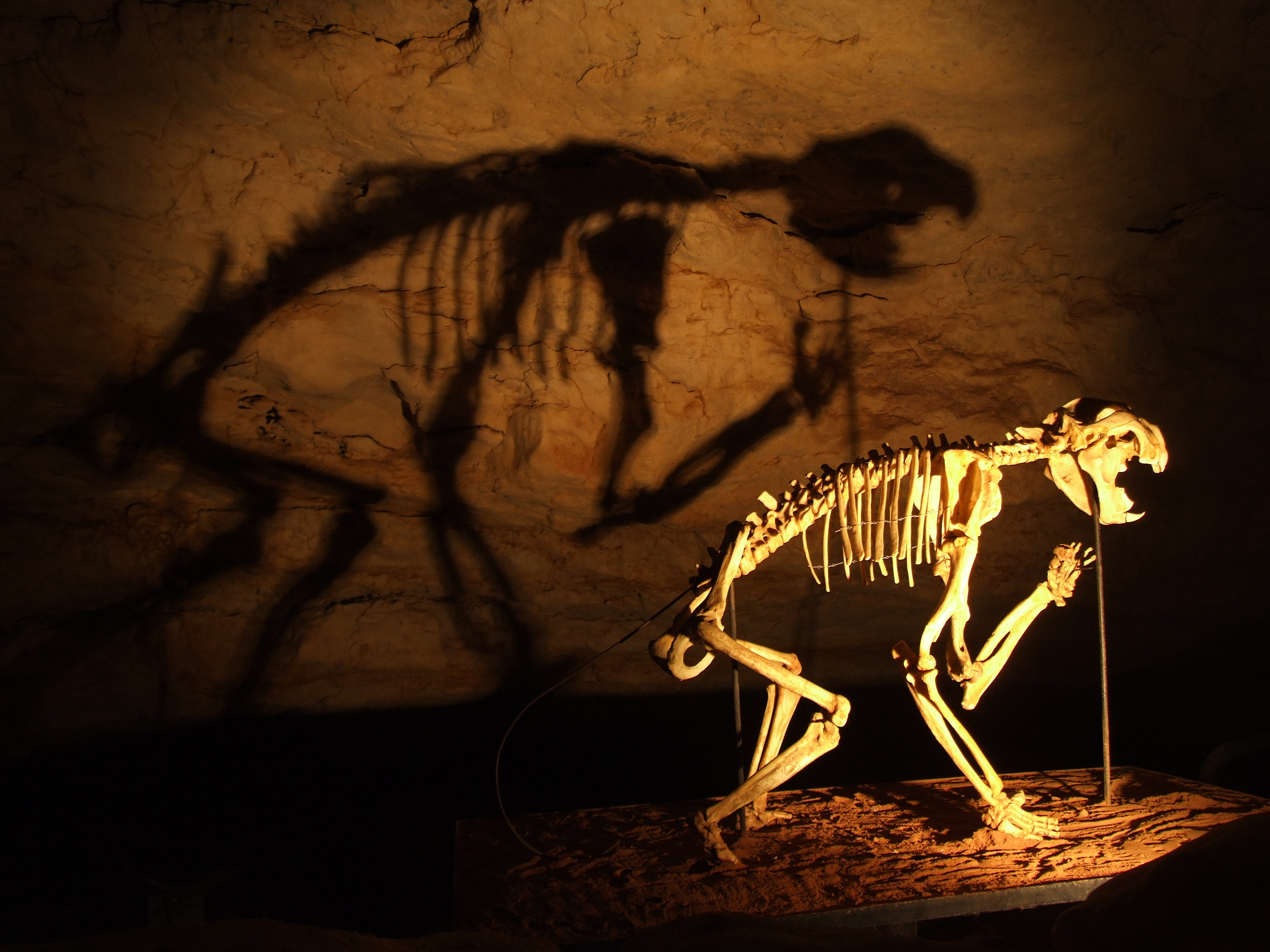
A marsupial lion skeleton in the Naracoorte Caves, South Australia

Australian megafauna were megafauna which inhabited Australia during the Pleistocene Epoch. Most of these species became extinct during the latter half of the Pleistocene, as part of the broader global Late Quaternary extinction event. The roles of human and climatic factors in their extinction are debated.

There are similarities between the prehistoric Australian megafauna and some mythical creatures from the Aboriginal Dreamtime.

== Causes of extinction ==
Many modern researchers, including Tim Flannery, think that with the arrival of early Aboriginal Australians, hunting and the use of fire to manage their environment may have contributed to the extinction of the megafauna. Increased aridity during peak glaciation (about 18,000 years ago) may have also contributed, but most of the megafauna were already extinct by this time. Others, including Steve Wroe, note that records in the Australian Pleistocene are rare, and there is not enough data to definitively determine the time of extinction of many of the species, with many of the species having no confirmed record within the last 100,000 years. They suggest that many of the extinctions had been staggered over the course of the late Middle Pleistocene and early Late Pleistocene, prior to human arrival, due to climatic stress.

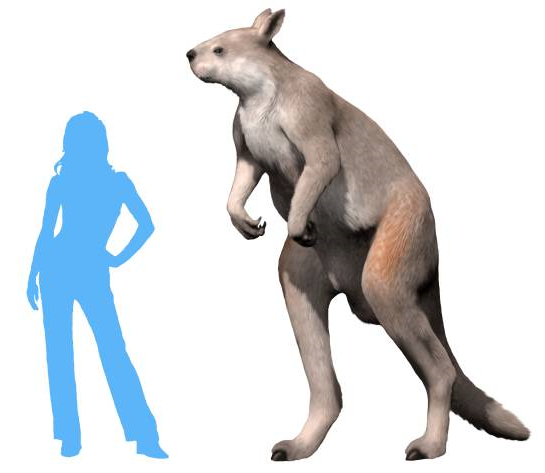
Procoptodon goliah reconstruction

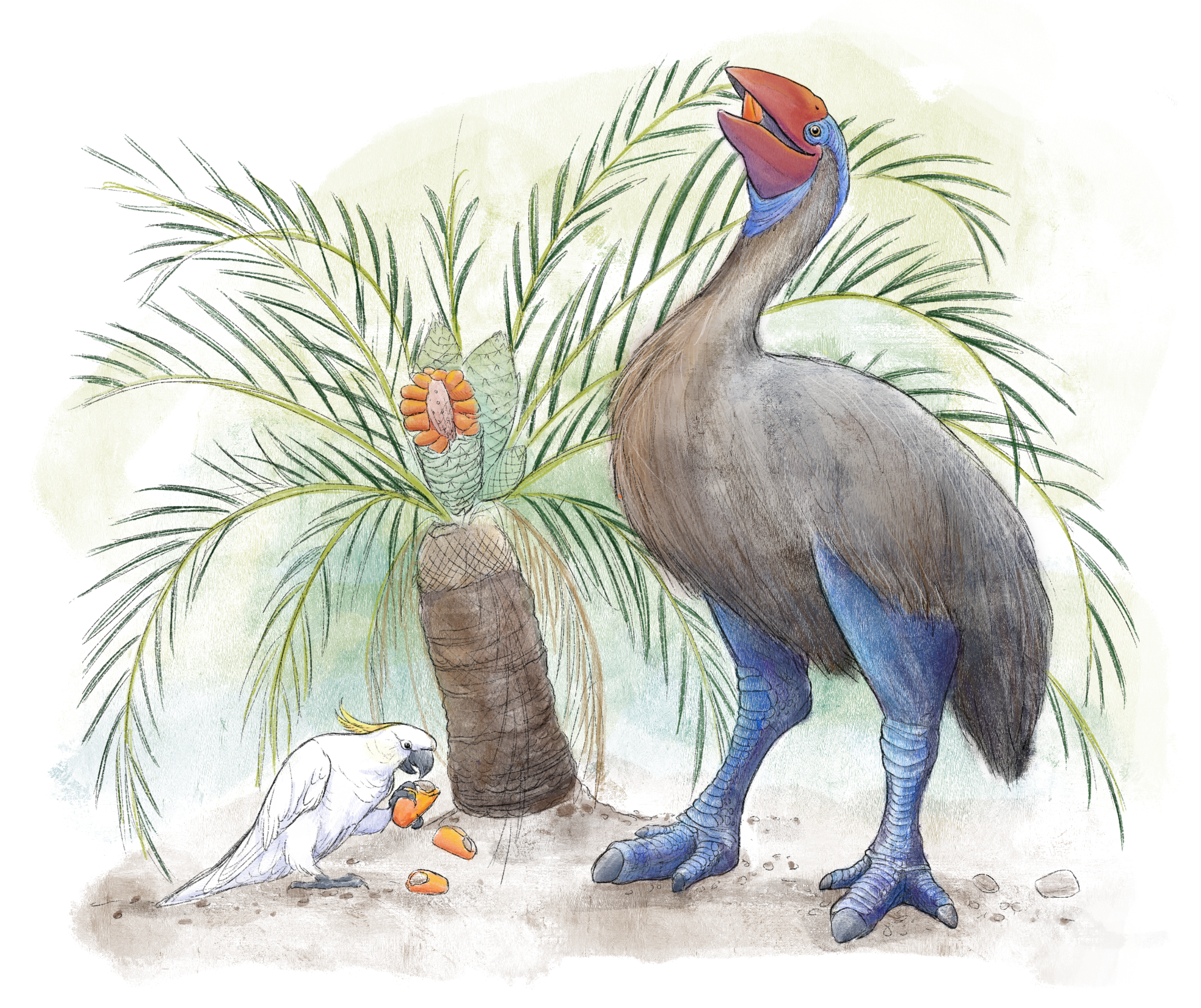
Genyornis newtoni

New evidence based on accurate optically stimulated luminescence and uranium–thorium dating of megafaunal remains suggests that humans were the ultimate cause of the extinction for some of the megafauna in Australia. The dates derived show that all forms of megafauna on the Australian mainland became extinct in the same rapid timeframe—approximately 46,000 years ago—the period when the earliest humans first arrived in Australia (around 70,000~65,000 years ago long chronology and 50,000 years ago short chronology). However, these results were subsequently disputed, with another study showing that 50 of 88 megafaunal species have no dates postdating the penultimate glacial maximum around 130,000 years ago, and there was only firm evidence for overlap of 8-14 megafaunal species with people. Analysis of oxygen and carbon isotopes from teeth of megafauna indicate the regional climates at the time of extinction were similar to arid regional climates of today and that the megafauna were well adapted to arid climates. The dates derived have been interpreted as suggesting that the main mechanism for extinction was human burning of a landscape that was then much less fire-adapted; oxygen and carbon isotopes of teeth indicate sudden, drastic, non-climate-related changes in vegetation and in the diet of surviving marsupial species. However, early Aboriginal peoples appear to have rapidly eliminated the megafauna of Tasmania about 41,000 years ago (following formation of a land bridge to Australia about 43,000 years ago as Ice Age sea levels declined) without using fire to modify the environment there, implying that at least in this case hunting was the most important factor. It has also been suggested that the vegetational changes that occurred on the mainland were a consequence, rather than a cause, of the elimination of the megafauna. This idea is supported by sediment cores from Lynch's Crater in Queensland, which suggest that fire increased in the local ecosystem about a century after the disappearance of Sporormiella (a fungus found in herbivorous animal dung used as a megafaunal proxy), leading to a subsequent transition to fire-tolerant sclerophyll vegetation. However, the use of Sporormiella as a megafaunal proxy has been criticised, noting that Sporormiella is found sporadically in the dung of various herbivorous species, including extant emus and kangaroos, not just megafauna, that its presence depends on a variety of factors, often unrelated to megafaunal abundance, and that in Cuddie Springs, a well known megafaunal site, the densities of Sporormiella were consistently low. A study of extinct megafauna at the Walker Creek site in Queensland, found that their disappearance from the site after 40 kya came after an extended period of environmental deterioration.

Chemical analysis of fragments of eggshells of Genyornis newtoni, a flightless bird that became extinct in Australia, from over 200 sites, revealed scorch marks consistent with cooking in human-made fires, presumably the first direct evidence of human contribution to the extinction of a species of the Australian megafauna. This was later contested by another study that noted the size of the eggs (126 by 97 millimetres (5.0 in × 3.8 in), roughly the size of emu eggs, while moa eggs ranged in size from 120 by 91 millimetres (4.7 in × 3.6 in) to 240 by 178 millimetres (9.4 in × 7.0 in)) was too small for the Genyornis supposed eggs, and instead attributed them to another much smaller extinct bird, the megapode Progura. The real time when Genyornis vanished is still an open question, but this was believed as one of the best documented megafauna extinctions in Australia.

"Imperceptive overkill", a scenario where anthropogenic pressures take place, slowly and gradually wiping the megafauna out, has been suggested.

On the other hand, there is also evidence to suggest that (contrary to other conclusions) the megafauna lived alongside humans for several thousand years. The question of if (and how) the megafauna died before the arrival of humans is still debated; with some authors maintaining that only a minority of such fauna remained by the time the first humans settled on the mainland. One of the most important advocates of human role, Tim Flannery, author of the book Future Eaters, was heavily criticised for his conclusions. A surprisingly late date of 33-37 kya is known for a Zygomaturus specimen from the Willandra Lakes Region in New South Wales, the latest known date for any Australian megafauna. This is well after aboriginal arrival in Australia around 50 kya.

A 2021 study found that the rate of extinction of Australia's megafauna is rather unusual, with some more generalistic species going extinct earlier while highly specialised ones went extinct later or even survived till today. A mosaic cause of extinction with different anthropogenic and environmental pressures was proposed.

== Living Australian megafauna ==
The term "megafauna" is usually applied to large animals of 100 kg (220 lb) or more in weight. In Australia, however, megafauna were never as large as those found on other continents, and so a more lenient criterion of 40 kg (88 lb) or more in weight is often applied.

=== Marsupials ===
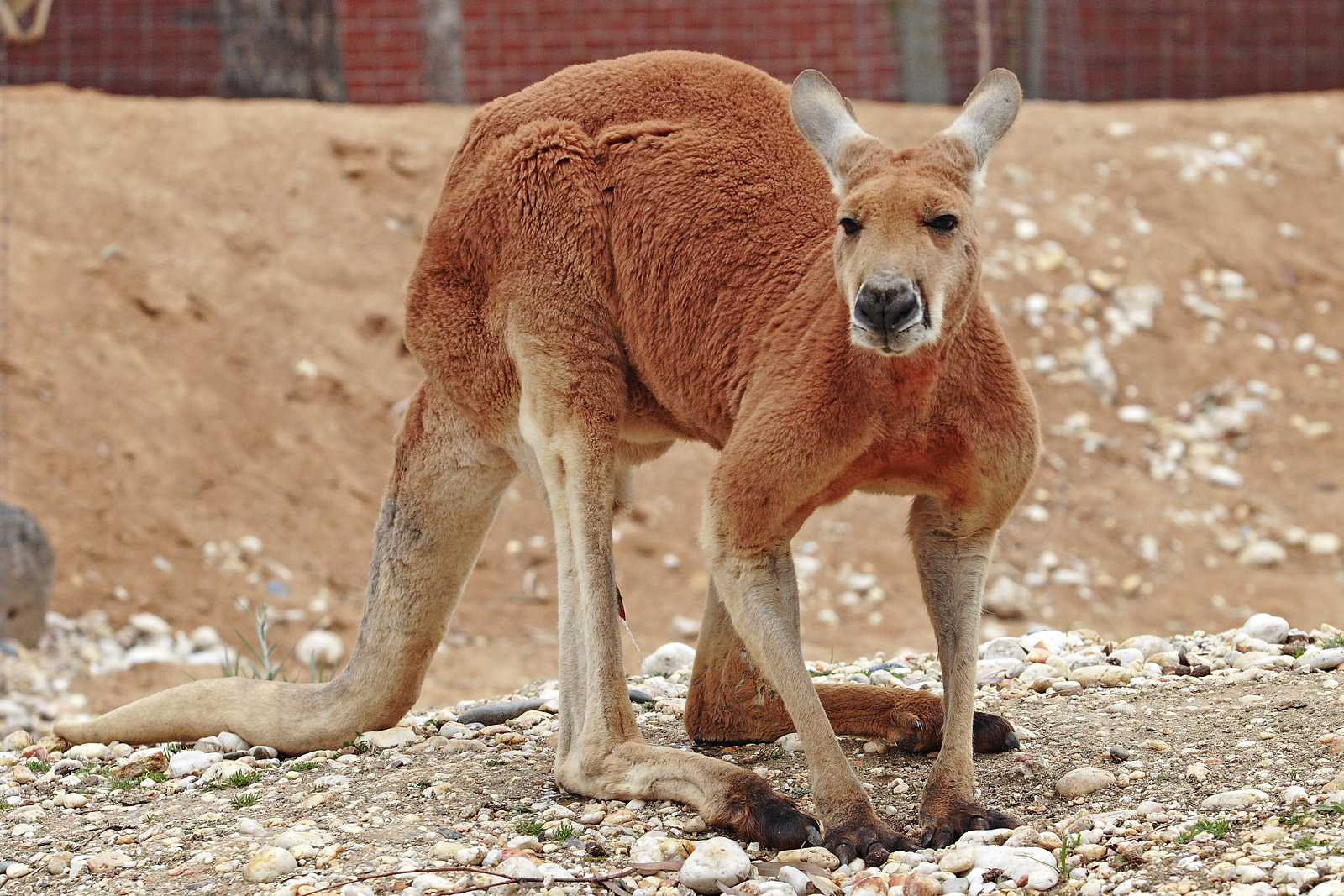
A red kangaroo

- The red kangaroo (Osphranter rufus) grows up to 1.8 m (6 ft) tall and weighs up to 85 kg (187 lb). Females grow up to 1.1 m (3 ft 7 in) tall and weigh up to 35 kg (77 lb). Tails on both males and females can be up to 1 m (3 ft 3 in) long.
- The eastern grey kangaroos (Macropus giganteus). Although a male typically stands almost 2 m (6 ft 7 in) tall and weighs around 66 kg (145 lb), the scientific name Macropus giganteus (gigantic large-foot) is misleading, as the red kangaroo living in the semi-arid inland is larger.
- The antilopine kangaroo (Osphranter antilopinus), sometimes called the antilopine wallaroo or the antilopine wallaby, is a species of macropod found in northern Australia at Cape York Peninsula in Queensland, the Top End of the Northern Territory, and the Kimberley region of Western Australia. They can weigh as much as 47 kg (104 lb) and grow over 1 m (3 ft 3 in) long.
- Common wombats (Vombatus ursinus) can reach 40 kg (88 lb). They thrive in Eastern Australia and Tasmania, preferring temperate forests and highland regions.

=== Birds ===
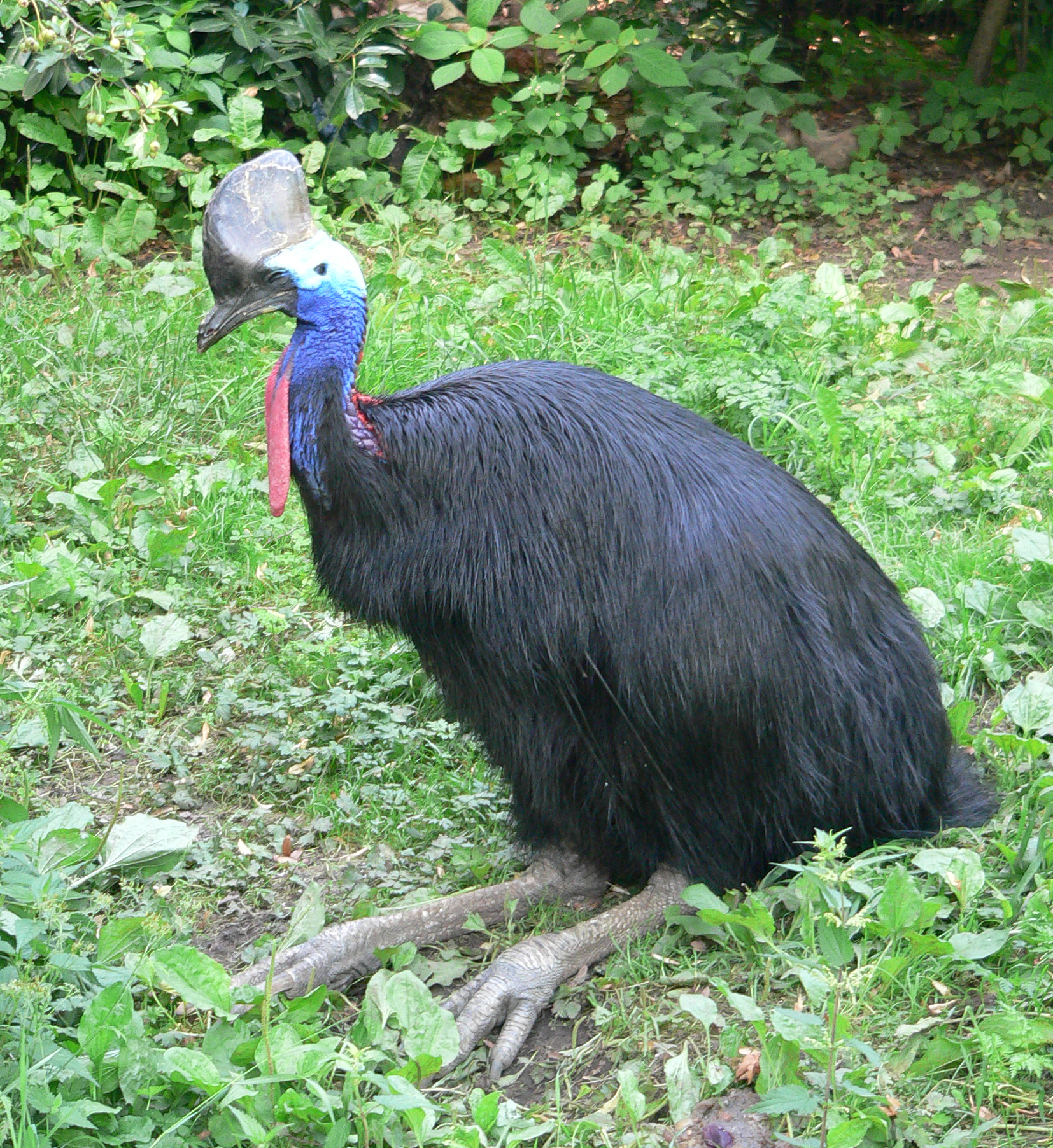
A southern cassowary

- The emu (Dromaius novaehollandiae)
- The southern cassowary (Casuarius casuarius)

=== Reptiles ===
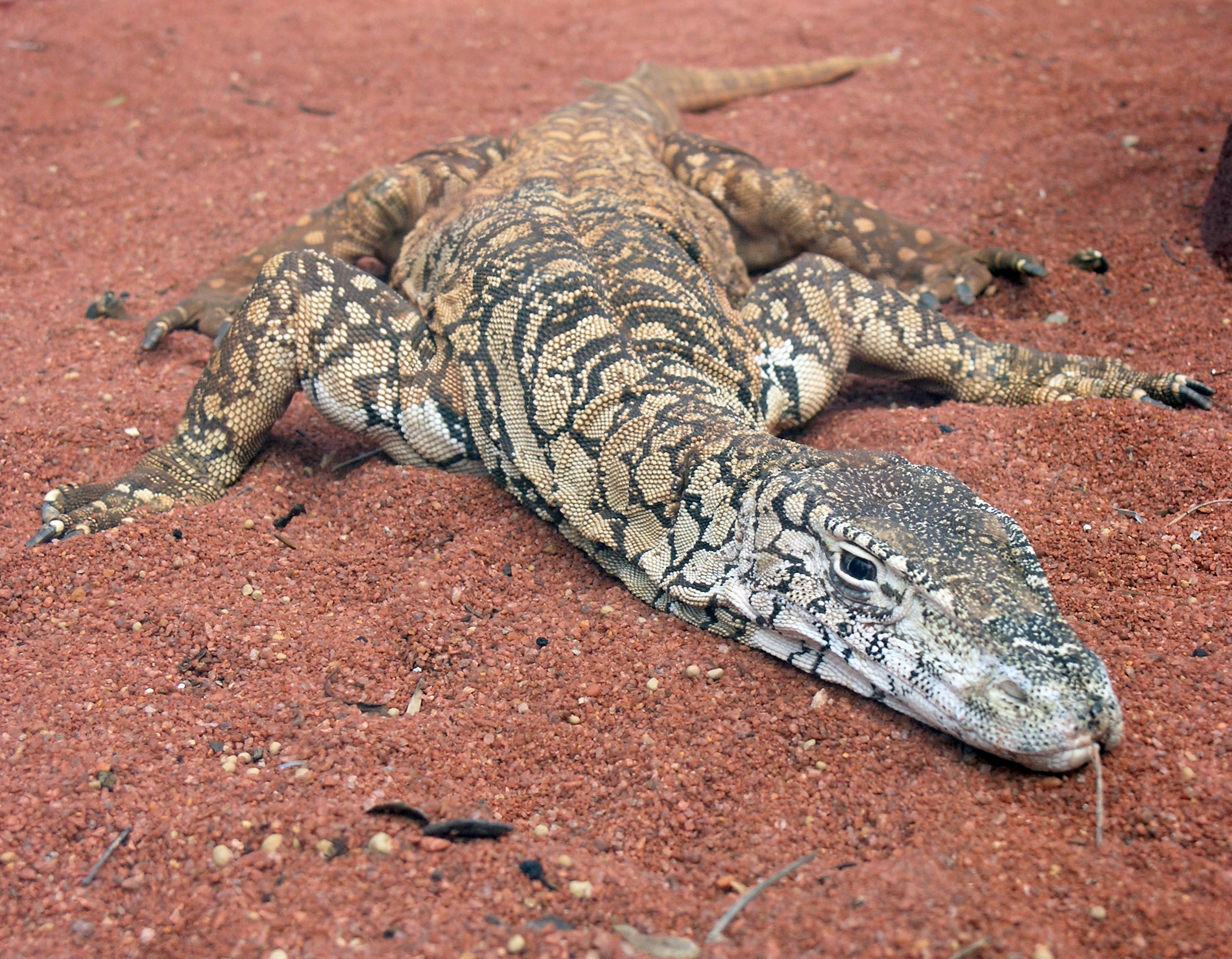
A perentie

- Goannas, being predatory lizards, are often quite large or bulky, with sharp teeth and claws. The largest extant goanna is the perentie (Varanus giganteus), which can grow over 2 m (6 ft 7 in) in length. However, not all goannas are gargantuan: pygmy goannas may be smaller than a man's arm.
- A healthy adult male saltwater crocodile (Crocodylus porosus) is typically 4.8–7 m (15 ft 9 in – 23 ft 0 in) long and weighs around 1,000 kg (2,200 lb), with many being much larger than that. The female is much smaller, with typical body lengths of 2.5–3 m (8 ft 2 in – 9 ft 10 in). An 8.5 m (28 ft) saltwater crocodile was reportedly shot on the Norman River of Queensland in 1957; a cast was made of it and is on display as a popular tourist attraction. However, due to the lack of solid evidence (other than the plaster replica), and the length of time since the crocodile was caught, it is not considered "official".
- The freshwater crocodile (Crocodylus johnstoni) is a relatively small crocodilian. Males can grow to 2.3–3 m (7 ft 7 in – 9 ft 10 in) in length, while females reach a maximum length of 2.1 m (6 ft 11 in). Males commonly weigh around 60 kg (130 lb), with large specimens up to 85 kg (187 lb) or more, as against the average female weight of 20 kg (44 lb). In places such as Lake Argyle and Nitmiluk National Park (Katherine Gorge), there exist a handful of confirmed 4-metre (13 ft) individuals.

== Extinct Australian megafauna ==
The following is an incomplete list of extinct Australian megafauna (monotremes, marsupials, birds and reptiles) in the format:

- Latin name, (common name, period alive), and a brief description.

=== Monotremes ===
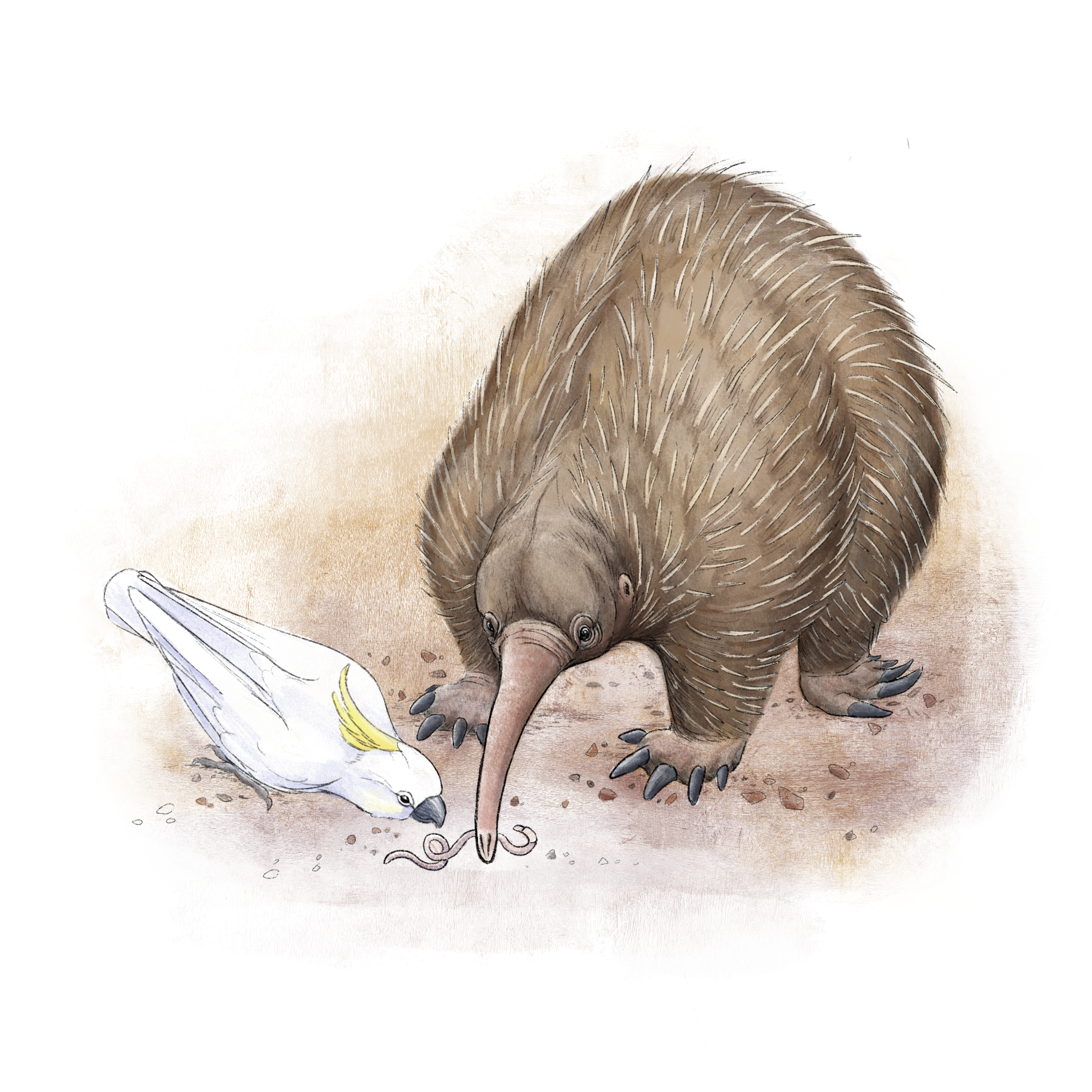
Hackett's giant echidna

Monotremes are arranged by size with the largest at the top.

- Murrayglossus hacketti was a sheep-sized echidna uncovered in Mammoth Cave in Western Australia, and is the largest monotreme so far uncovered.
- Obdurodon dicksoni was a platypus up to 60 cm (2 ft) in total length, fossils of which were found at Riversleigh.
- Megalibgwilia ramsayi was a large, long-beaked echidna with powerful forelimbs for digging.

=== Marsupials ===
Marsupials are arranged by size, with the largest at the top.

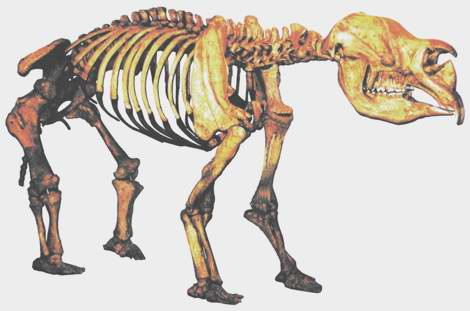
Diprotodon optatum was a hippopotamus-sized marsupial and was most closely related to wombats

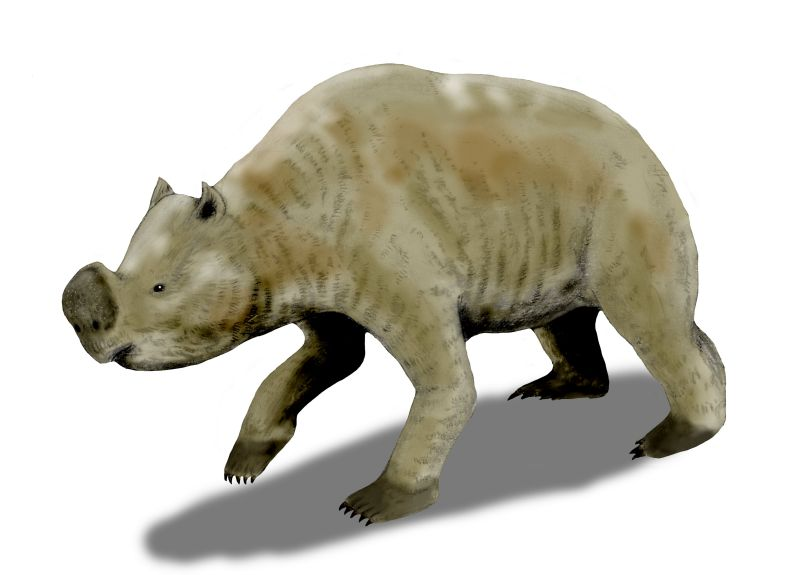
Zygomaturus trilobus

==== 1,000–3,000 kilograms (2,200–6,610 lb) ====
- Diprotodon optatum is not only the largest known species of diprotodontid, but also the largest known marsupial to ever exist. Approximately 3 m (10 ft) long and 2 m (7 ft) high at the shoulder and weighing up to 2,780 kg (6,130 lb), it resembled a giant wombat. It is the only marsupial known, living or extinct, to have conducted seasonal migrations.
- Palorchestes azael was a diprotodontoid similar in size to Zygomaturus. It had long claws to grasp branches with. It lived during the Pleistocene.

==== 100–1,000 kilograms (220–2,200 lb) ====
- Zygomaturus trilobus was a smaller (bullock-sized, about 2 m (7 ft) long by 1 m (3 ft) high) diprotodontid that may have had a short trunk. It appears to have lived in wetlands, using two fork-like incisors to shovel up reeds and sedges for food.
- Macropus pearsoni and M. ferragus
- Phascolonus gigas a gigantic true wombat, and the largest known true wombat
- Procoptodon goliah (the giant short-faced kangaroo) is the largest-known kangaroo to have ever lived. It grew 2–3 metres (7–10 feet) tall, and weighed up to 230 kg (510 lb).
- Procoptodon rapha, P. pusio and P. texasensis
- Protemnodon, a genus of wallaby with four known giant species out of 11 known species
- Ramsayia magna a giant wombat weighing around 100 kilograms (220 lb)
- Sthenurus tindalei and S. atlas
- Thylacoleo carnifex (the marsupial lion) is the largest known carnivorous mammal to have ever lived in prehistoric Australia, and was of comparable size to female placental mammal lions and tigers. It had a catlike skull with large slicing pre-molars, a retractable thumb-claw, and massive forelimbs. It was almost certainly carnivorous and a tree-dweller.

==== 10–100 kilograms (22–220 lb) ====
- Simosthenurus pales
- Phascolarctos stirtoni (the giant koala) was similar in structure to the modern koala (P. cinereus), but one-third larger.
- Phascolomys medius
- Lasiorhinus angustidens
- Sedophascolomys a giant wombat
- Thylacinus cynocephalus (the thylacine, Tasmanian wolf or Tasmanian tiger), which notably survived into recent history (the last known individual died in 1936).

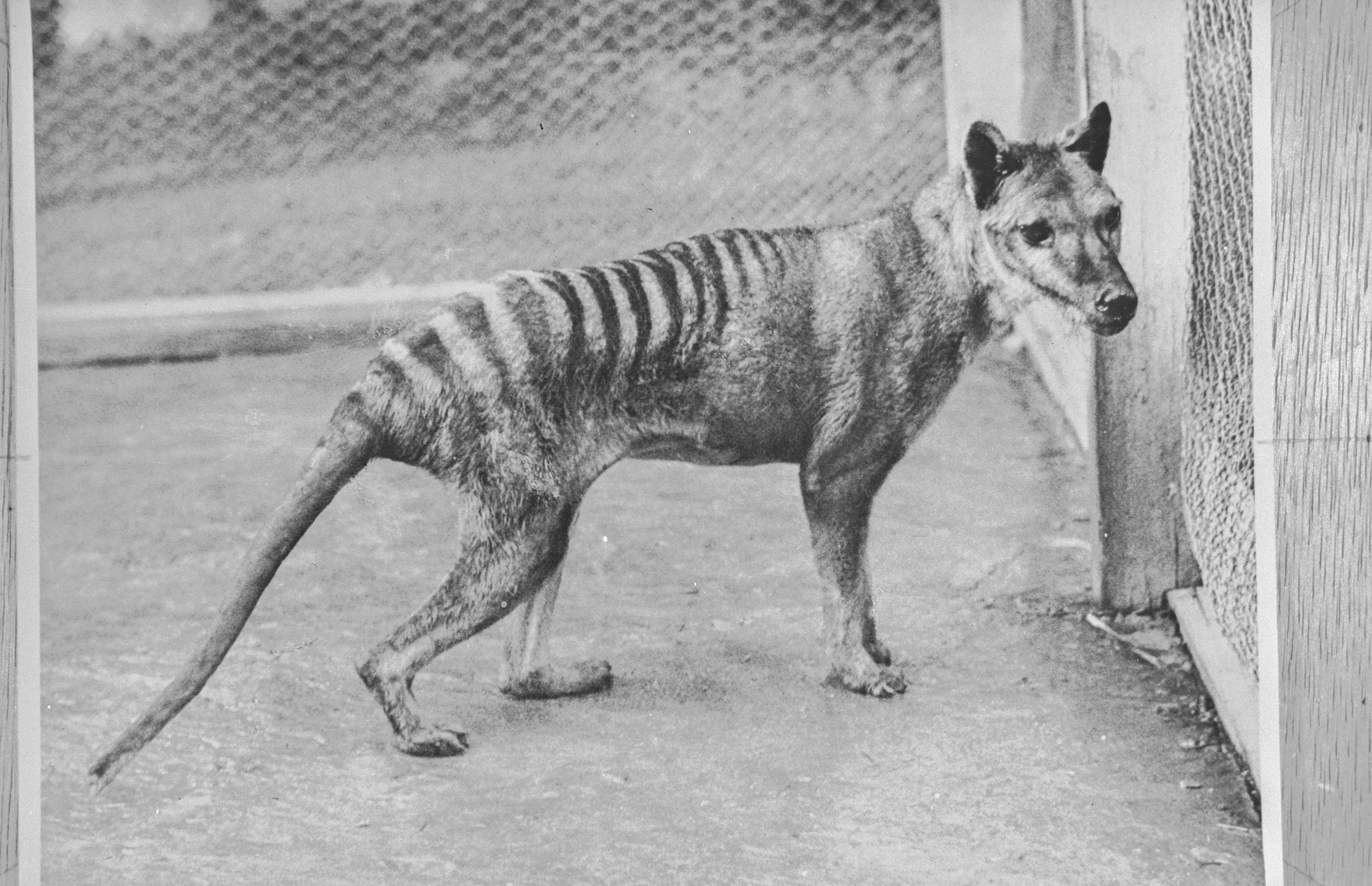
A 1936 picture of a thylacine at Beaumaris Zoo, Tasmania.

- Congruus congruus, a wallaby from Naracoorte
- Troposodon minor
- Sthenurus oreas
- Simosthenurus occidentalis (another sthenurine) was about as tall as a modern eastern grey kangaroo, but much more robust. It is one of the nine known species of leaf-eating kangaroos identified in fossils found in Naracoorte Caves National Park.
- Simothenurus brownei
- Propleopus oscillans (the giant rat-kangaroo) was a large (about 70 kg (150 lb) rat-kangaroo with large shearing and stout grinding teeth that indicate it may have been an opportunistic omnivore able to eat invertebrates, vertebrates (possibly carrion), fruits, and soft leaves. Grew to about 1.5–3 m (5–10 ft) in height.
- Simothenurus maddocki
- Sthenurus andersoni
- Vombatus hacketti
- Macropus thor
- Macropus piltonensis
- Macropus rama
- Simothenurus gilli
- Warrendja wakefieldi, a wombat from Naracoorte
- Sarcophilus harrisii laniarius, a large subspecies of the Tasmanian devil.

=== Birds ===
- Genyornis newtoni, a large, man-sized bird, and the last surviving member of Dromornithidae.
- Progura gallinacea (the giant malleefowl) was a larger relative of the extant malleefowl (Leipoa ocellata).
- Cryptogyps lacertosus extinct large vulture.
- Dynatoaetus gaffae, largest bird of prey of Australia, second only to the Haast's eagle of New Zealand

=== Reptiles ===
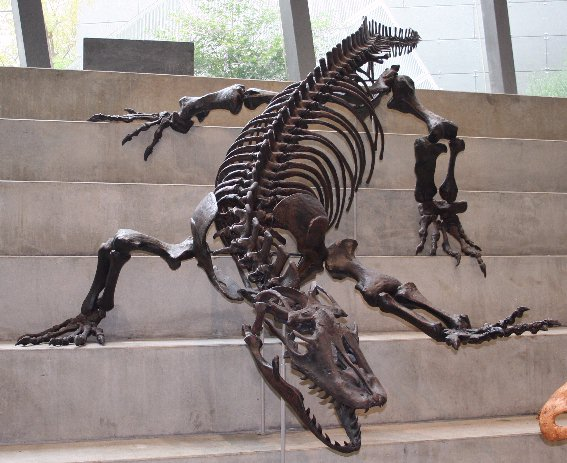
A reconstructed skeleton of the extinct megalania (Varanus priscus)

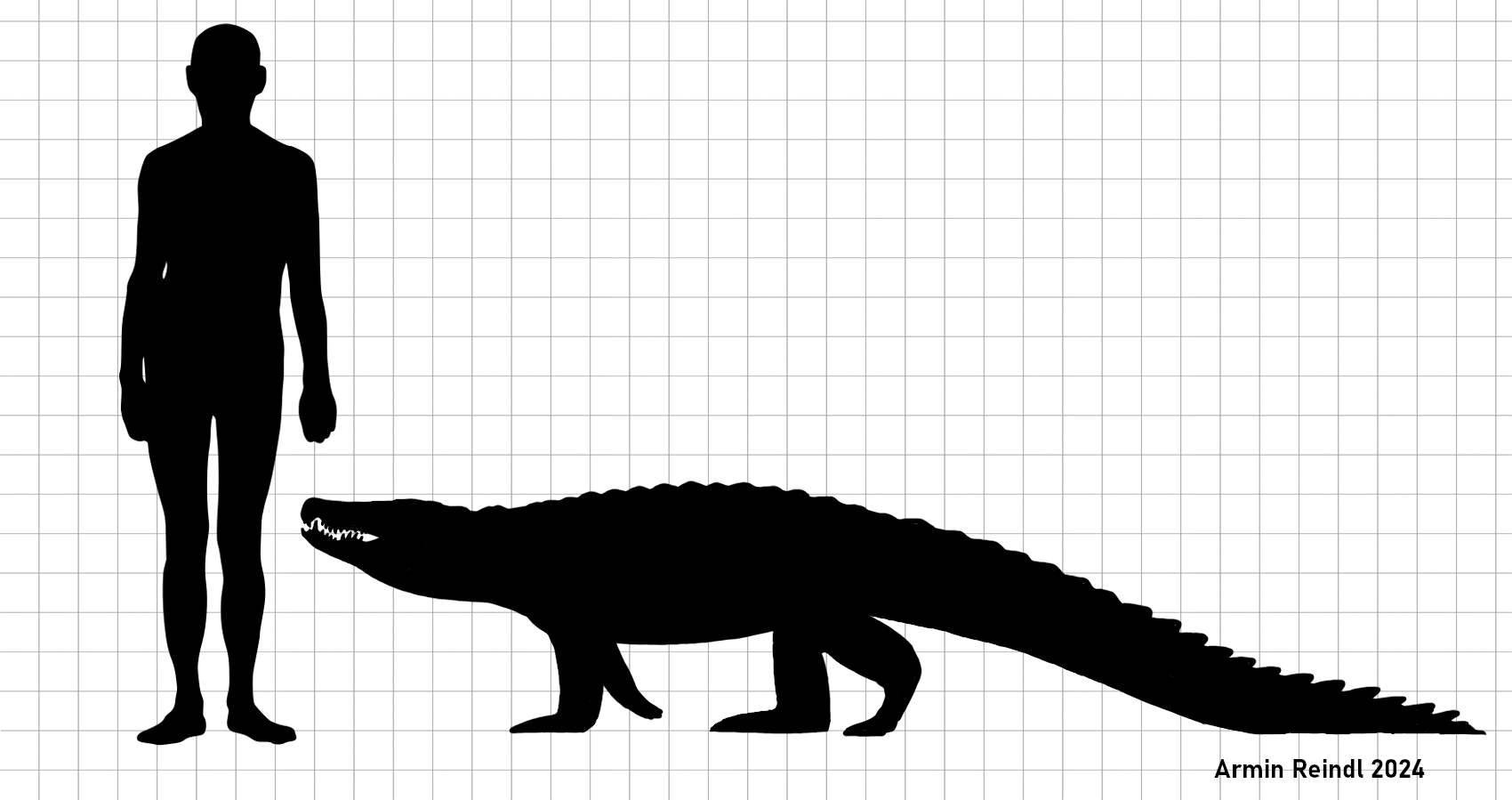
Size comparison of Quinkana

- Paludirex gracilis a large aquatic freshwater crocodilian belonging to the extinct group Mekosuchinae, likely reaching a length of at least 4 m (13 ft).
- Megalania (Varanus priscus) was a giant carnivorous monitor lizard, reaching a size comparable or exceeding that of the Komodo dragon, that might have grown to as long as 5.5 m (18 ft), and weighed up to 575 kg (1,270 lb).
- Wonambi naracoortensis was a non-venomous snake belonging to the extinct family Madtsoiidae, which reached 5–6 m (16–20 ft) in length. It was an ambush predator living at waterholes located in natural sun traps and killed its prey by constriction.
- Quinkana was a semi-terrestrial crocodilian that normally grew around 3 m (9.8 ft) in length. Its blade-like teeth for cutting suggests its terrestrial ecology. It belonged to the extinct group Mekosuchinae. It was discovered at the Bluff Downs in Queensland.
- Meiolania was a genus of huge terrestrial stem-turtle (Meiolaniidae) measuring 2.5 m (8 ft) in length, with horned heads and spiked tails.

== Extinct megafauna contemporaneous with Aboriginal Australians ==
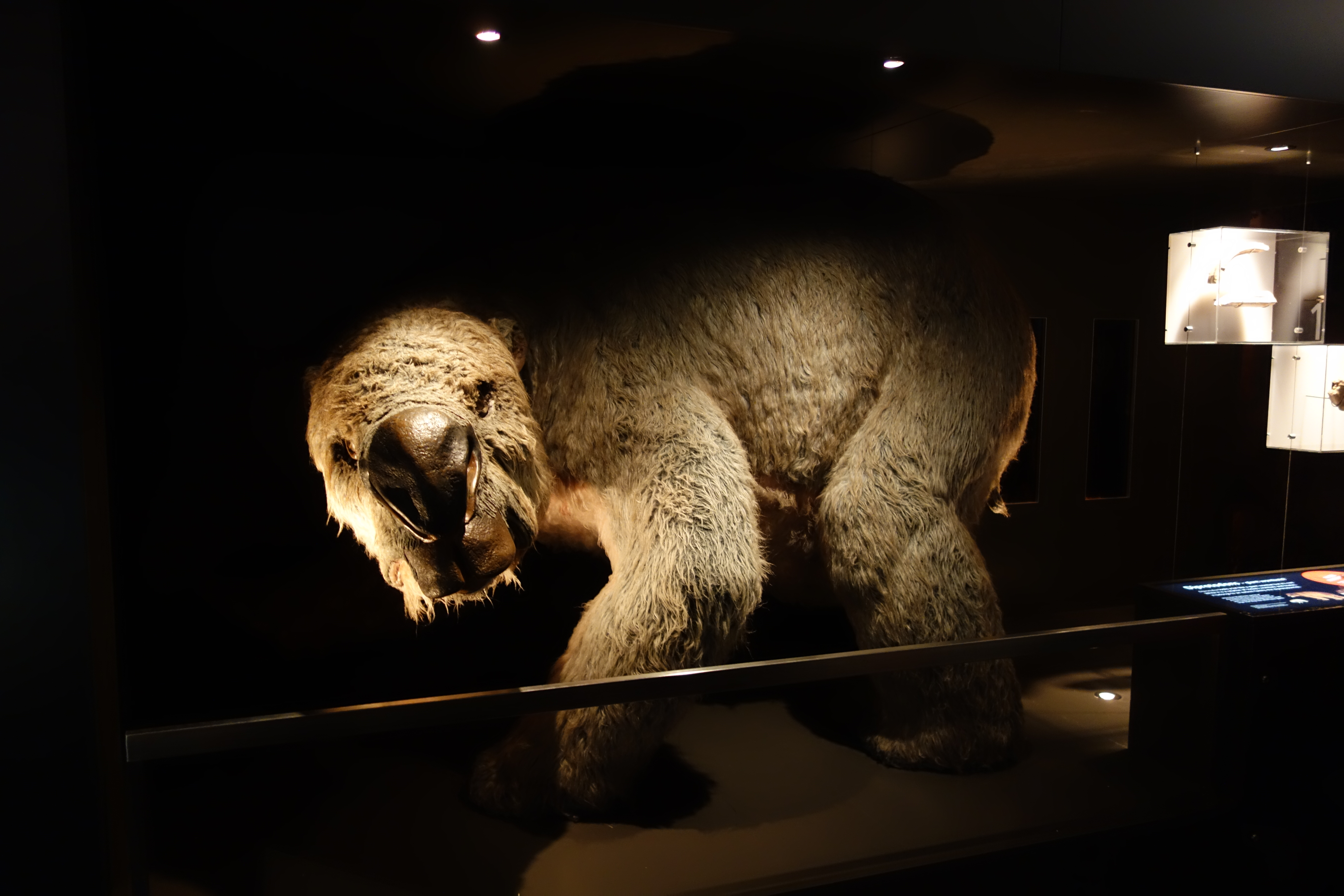
Reconstruction of a hippopotamus-sized Diprotodon

Monsters and large animals in Dreamtime stories have been associated with extinct megafauna.

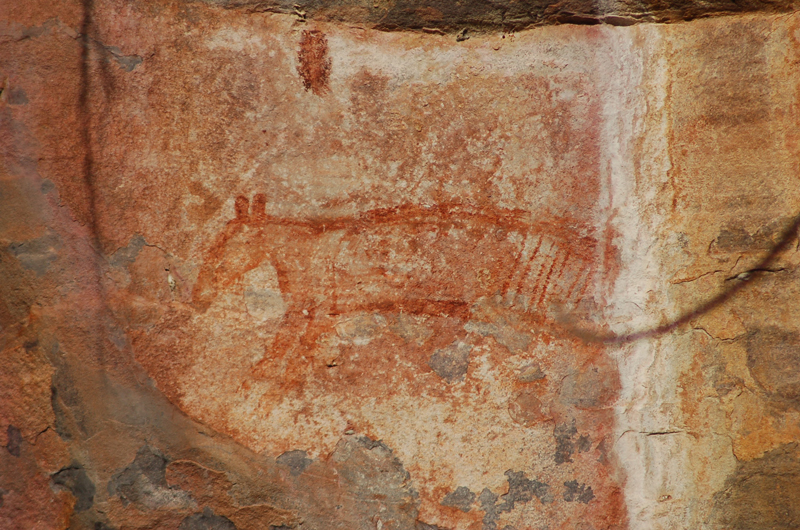
Thylacine as seen in rock art at Ubirr

The association was made at least as early as 1845, with colonists writing that Aboriginal people identified Diprotodon bones as belonging to bunyips, and Thomas Worsnop concluding that the fear of bunyip attacks at watering holes remembered a time when Diprotodon lived in marshes.

In the early 1900s, John Walter Gregory outlined the Kadimakara (or Kuddimurka or Kadimerkera) story of the Diyari (similar stories being told by nearby peoples), which describes the deserts of Central Australia as having once been "fertile, well-watered plains" with giant gum trees, and almost solid cloud cover overhead. The trees created a roof of vegetation in which lived the strange monsters called Kadimakara—which sometimes came to the ground to eat. One time, the gum trees were destroyed, forcing the Kadimakara to remain on the ground, particularly Lake Eyre and Kalamurina, until they died.

In times of drought and flood, the Diyari performed corroborees (including dances and blood sacrifices) at the bones of the Kadimakara to appease them and request that they intercede with the spirits of rain and clouds. Sites of Kadimakara bones identified by Aboriginal people corresponded with megafauna fossil sites, and an Aboriginal guide identified a Diprotodon jaw as belonging to the Kadimakara.

Gregory speculated that the story could be a remnant from when the Diyari lived elsewhere, or when the geographical conditions of Central Australia were different. The latter possibility would indicate Aboriginal coexistence with megafauna, with Gregory saying:

If, therefore, the geologist can determine whether the bones of the extinct monsters of Lake Eyre correspond to those described in the aboriginal traditions, he can throw light on several interesting problems. If the legends attribute to the extinct animals characters which they possessed, but which the natives could not have inferred from the bones, then the legends are of local origin. They would prove that man inhabited Central Australia, at the same time as the mighty diprotodon and the extinct, giant kangaroos. If, on the other hand, there is no such correspondence between the legends and the fossils, then we must regard the traditions as due to the habit of migratory peoples, of localising in new homes the incidents recorded in their folklore.

— John Walter Gregory, Dead Heart of Australia

After examining fossils, Gregory concluded that the story was a combination of the two factors, but that the environment of Lake Eyre had probably not changed much since Aboriginal habitation. He concluded that while some references to Kadimakara were probably memories of the crocodiles once found in Lake Eyre, others that describe a "big, heavy land animal, with a single horn on its forehead" were probably references to Diprotodon.

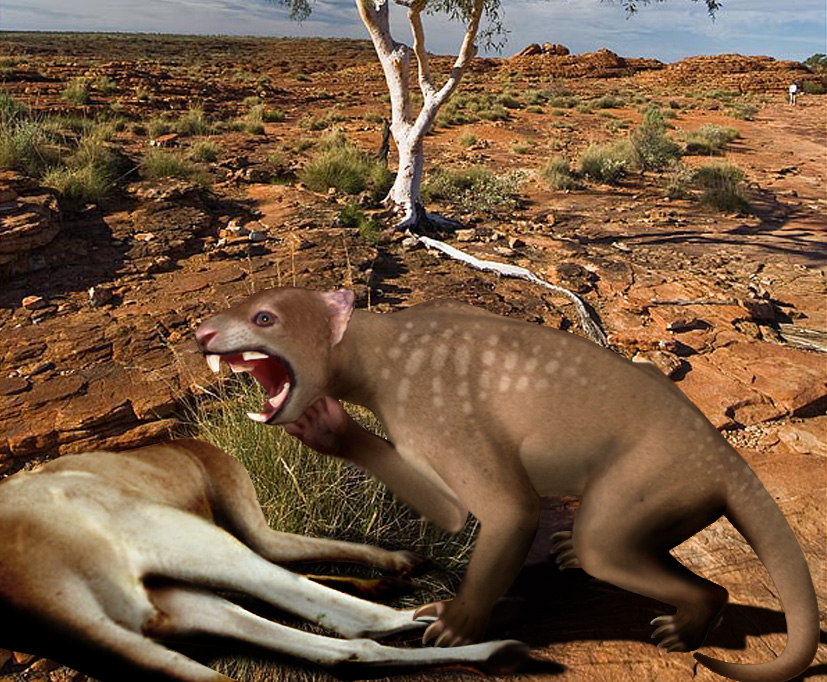
Some of the marsupial lions were the largest mammalian predators in Australia of their time

Geologist Michael Welland describes from across Australian Dreamtime "tales of giant creatures that roamed the lush landscape until aridity came and they finally perished in the desiccated marshes of Kati Thanda–Lake Eyre", giving as examples the Kadimakara of Lake Eye, as well as continent-wide stories of the Rainbow Serpent, which he says corresponds with Wonambi naracoortensis.

Journalist Peter Hancock speculates in The Crocodile That Wasn't that a Dreamtime story from the Perth area could be a memory of Varanus priscus. However, the story in question details dingoes attacking or frightening off the alleged V. priscus, when the giant lizard died out nearly 46,000 years before the accepted arrival date of dingoes.

Rock art in the Kimberley region appears to depict a marsupial lion and a marsupial tapir, as does Arnhem land art. Arnhem art also appears to depict Genyornis, a bird that is believed to have gone extinct 40,000 years ago.

An Early Triassic archosauromorph found in Queensland, Kadimakara australiensis, is named after the Kadimakara.

== See also ==
- List of Australian animals extinct in the Holocene
- Cuddie Springs – Archaeological site in Australia
- Hulitherium and Maokopia (Diprotodontoids inhabited New Guinea during the Pleistocene)
- Komodo dragon – Largest living species of lizard (Believed to have evolved in Australia)
- Quaternary extinction event – Extinction of large animals at the end of the last Ice Age
- Pleistocene rewilding (there exist discussions about validity of invasive species in Australia to compensate for ecological niches of extinct Australian megafauna)
