= Charles Dortch =

Australian archaeologist and anthropologist

Charles Eugene Dortch (born 1940) is a US born archaeologist, largely known for his life and works in Western Australia.

== Biography ==
Charlie Dortch was born in Atlanta, Georgia, where he began his interest in the peoples of the first nations, and in history and archaeology. He completed a degree in history from the University of Southern Mississippi and furthered his studies in the United Kingdom at University College London. Dortch was invited to apply for a position as curator of the archaeological department of the Western Australian Museum by Ian Crawford, newly appointed to the museum's anthropology department.

After settling in Western Australia, he joined the palaeontologist Duncan Merrilees in beginning a study of the site at Devils Lair, an important fossil site located in Southwest Australia. Many of the papers to which he contributed concern this site and its evidence of early mammalian fauna.

In the early 1970s he was involved in research in the Kimberleys.

He was also interested in the altered coast, shoreline and lakes of the south west where he investigated submerged sites. A significant site was that of Lake Jasper, the first submerged Aboriginal site to be found in Australia.

Dortch completed his PhD at the University of Western Australia in 2001, and retired from the Western Australian Museum in 2003.
