= Duncan Merrilees =

Australian paleontologist and archaeologist

Duncan Merrilees (1922–2009) was an Australian geologist, palaeontologist, lecturer and curator at the Western Australian Museum. His research on the fossil records of mammals also founded examination into the period after the arrival of humans and their role within the ecology of the Australian continent. His excavations and research into mammalian palaeontology also included description of unknown species of extinct marsupials.

== Biography ==
Merrilees was born in Sydney and graduated from the city's university with a degree in chemistry in 1942. His qualifications saw him deployed during the Second World War to a Tasmanian wood pulping industry. His interest was drawn at this time to the study of igneous rock and then to the examination of fossilised mammals. He moved to Western Australia in 1951, after discontinuing a teaching career, and began lecturing in scientific literacy at the University of Western Australia. An overlapping role with the works of the Western Australian Museum was eventually altered to a full time position of curator of the palaeontology, mineral and meteorite collections. His major focus in palaeontology was what he referred to as the "large extinct marsupials".

He retired to a location near Manjimup in the southwest of Australia.

== Works ==
Amongst the works reporting the findings of excavations at fossil sites and study of the museum's specimens, Merrilees published a thesis on the impact of human practices introduced to the environment. In his proposed model of ecological changes after the first arrival of humans, the disappearance of megafauna as a direct consequence of their activities in Australia is comparable to Quaternary extinction events on other continents. Merrilees presented his research and conclusions, conducted under the supervision of W. D. L. Ride, in his presidential address to the Royal Society of Western Australia in 1967.

The archaeological sites he examined includes Devils Lair during 1970, an important source of fossilised material, in collaboration with Charles Dortch. His conservation activities were associated with a personal interest in farming, and in overseeing an official program of semi-cleared land purchase that sought to both enhance the agricultural potential and rehabilitation of bushland to its previous state.

Twenty-four papers were published with his professional contributions; a further six articles were authored as non-scientific works. He described two extinct species of Sthenurus, a kangaroo-like marsupial. According to the anonymous author of the obituary issued by his museum, Merrilees insisted on being listed in alphabetical order in the credits of papers he wrote with other, less senior, authors to elevate their name in the citations. Forty volumes of his field notes from archaeological sites around Australia are held at his museum's library.
