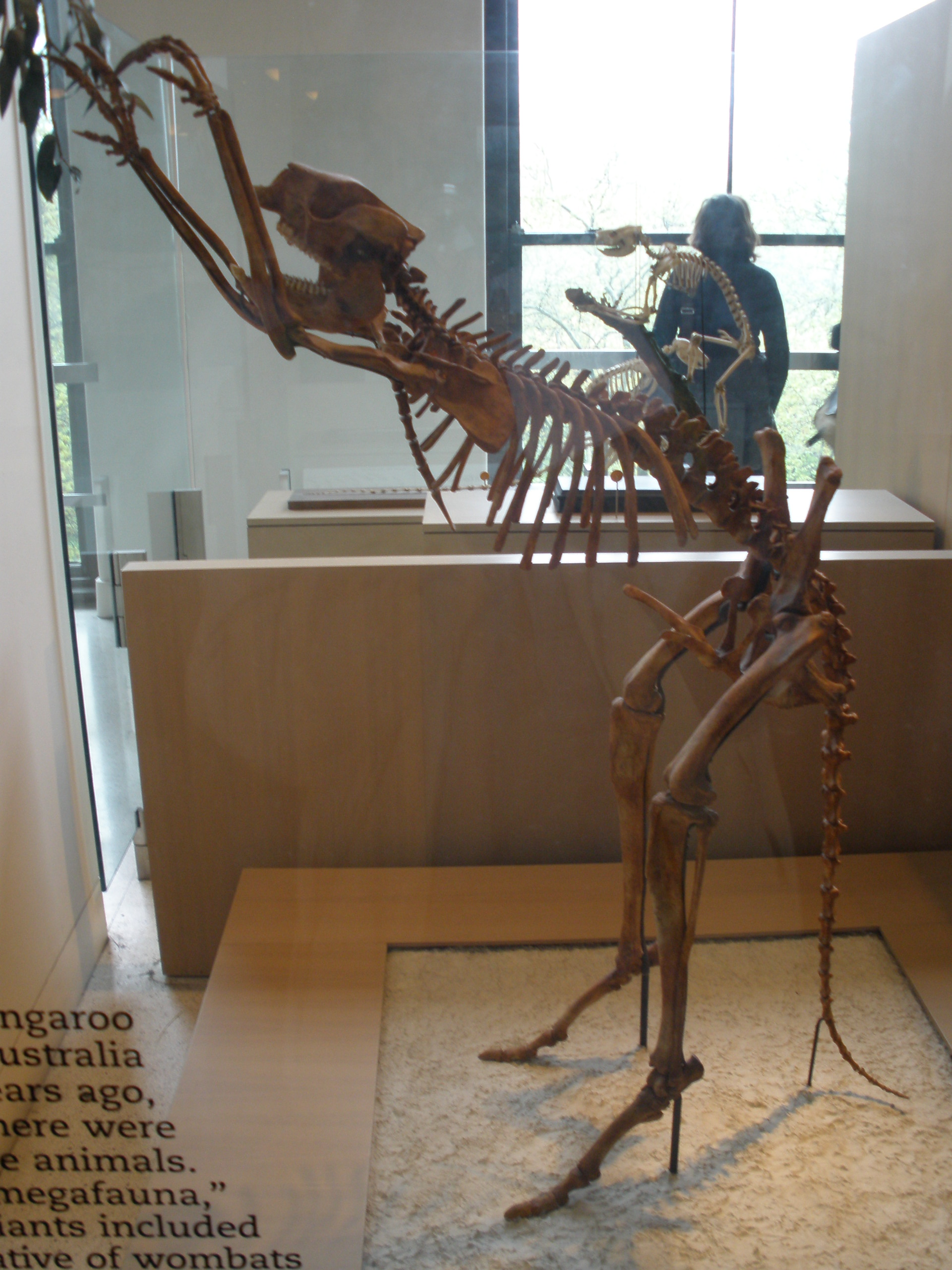
- Simosthenurus occidentalis skeleton mounted at American Museum of Natural History

Scientific classification
- Kingdom: Animalia
- Phylum: Chordata
- Class: Mammalia
- Infraclass: Marsupialia
- Order: Diprotodontia
- Family: Macropodidae
- Subfamily: †Sthenurinae; Glauert, 1926

Genera
- †Hadronomas; †Metasthenurus; †Rhizosthenurus; †Sthenurus; †Wabularoo?; †Wanburoo?; †Simosthenurini; †Archaeosimos; †Procoptodon; †Simosthenurus

= Sthenurinae =

Sthenurinae Temporal range: Early Miocene - Late Pleistocene, 18.5–0.04 Ma

Extinct subfamily of marsupials

Sthenurinae (from Sthenurus, Greek for 'strong-tailed') is a subfamily within the marsupial family Macropodidae, known as short-faced kangaroos or sthenurine kangaroos. No members of this subfamily are extant today, with all becoming extinct by the late Pleistocene. Procoptodon goliah, the largest macropodid known to have existed, was a sthenurine kangaroo, but sthenurines occurred in a range of sizes, with Procoptodon gilli being the smallest at the size of a small wallaby.

The short, robust skull of sthenurines is considered to be indicative that they were browsers that fed on leaves. Some species may have been able to reach above their heads and grasp branches with their semiopposable paws to assist in procuring leaves from trees. A single hoofed digit is present on the feet of sthenurines.

== Taxonomy ==
The subfamilial arrangement Sthenurinae was circumscribed by Ludwig Glauert in 1926.

== Locomotion ==
Unlike modern macropodids, which hop (either bipedally or quadrupedally), sthenurines seem to have abandoned saltation as a means of locomotion. Their comparatively inflexible spines, robust hindlimb and pelvic elements, and the lack of capacity for rapid hopping suggest that these animals walked bipedally, somewhat like hominids, even converging with those primates in details of their pelvic anatomy. Furthermore, their hooved single digits and metatarsal anatomy suggest that unlike their plantigrade relatives, sthenurines were digitigrade, walking on the tips of their "toes".
