= Devil's Lair =

Cave in Western Australia

- Interactive map of Devil's Lair
- Location: Leeuwin-Naturaliste National Park, Western Australia
- Coordinates: 34°4′3.3″S 115°6′23.5″E
- Geology: Karst cave
- Registry: 6WI-61

Devil's Lair is a single-chamber cave with a floor area of around 200 square metres (2,200 sq ft) that formed in a Quaternary dune limestone of the Leeuwin–Naturaliste Ridge, 5 kilometres (3.1 mi) from the modern coastline of Western Australia. The stratigraphic sequence in the cave floor deposit consists of 660 centimetres (260 in) of sandy sediments, with more than 100 distinct layers, intercalated with flowstone and other indurated deposits. Excavations have been made in several areas of the cave floor. Since 1973, excavations have been concentrated in the middle (approximately on a north-west, south-east axis) of the cave, where 10 trenches have been dug. Archaeological evidence for intermittent human occupation extends down about 350 centimetres (140 in) to layer 30, with hearths, bone, and stone artefacts found throughout. The site provides evidence of human habitation of Southwest Australia 50,000 years before the present day.

== Excavations ==
Devil's Lair has been the subject of scientific research since the 1970s by palaeontologists and archaeologists. Excavations have recovered stone artefacts, numerous animal bone remains, hearths, bone artefacts and human skeletal remains.

Through preservation of cultural materials, a long, well dated cultural sequence has been documented. The diversity of the evidence from Devil's Lair make it valuable as a source of information on cultural and natural history in the extreme southwest of Australia since the first colonization of the continent.

The site is named for the remains of the locally extinct Sarcophilus harrisii (Tasmanian devil), uncovered there, including its bones and those of the animals that it had fractured when consuming them at the site. The earliest palaeontological examination at the site was undertaken by E. L. Lundelius in 1955, then an American Fulbright scholar researching mammalian Pleistocene fauna in Western Australia. A review of tooth specimens of kangaroo species collected at the site discovered a human tooth was included and the archaeological significance of Devil's Lair prompted intense interest in that field.

== Archaeological significance ==
Devil's Lair is important as one of the earliest sites of human occupation in Australia, a site with very early human ornaments and an unusually rich source of information for prehistoric cultural and natural history in the southwest of Western Australia. The site boasts a rich history, occupation of the site dating back to more than 40,000 years ago. With dates of occupation as early as 48,000 years ago, Devil's Lair widens the scope of the peopling of Australia. Adze-like scrapers, jewelry, hearths, and faunal remains offer a glimpse of life in Australia during the Late Pleistocene, as well as the complexity of Pleistocene tool technologies. The site, albeit having sparse inhabitants, could be representative of adaptations towards terrestrial economies from coastal economies.

== Technology ==
Both stone and bone tools were found in Devil's Lair, present stratigraphically in trenches 2, 5, and 6. These tools are both complex and versatile, including flakes, bone points, adze-like scrapers, and limestone, quartz and chert scalar cores. Stone tools utilized a flake technology produced by discoidal cores, however, no discoidal cores were recovered from the site. Stone flakes were reused and had utility (sawing and cutting). Scaler cores as well were reutilized; one notched quartz core showing signs of being used as a scraper. Bone points, the second-most common artifact found, were sharpened and utilized similarly to modern Aboriginal bone points.

Stone tools, used for scraping, found at Paroo River, Queensland, similar to that found at Devil's Lair

== Dating ==
Several different techniques of dating have been used at Devil's Lair to show that human occupation began at around 48,000 years. This makes it rank among the earliest sites in Australia and so an important source of information about the timing and character of the first human colonizers of Australia.

=== Charcoal ===
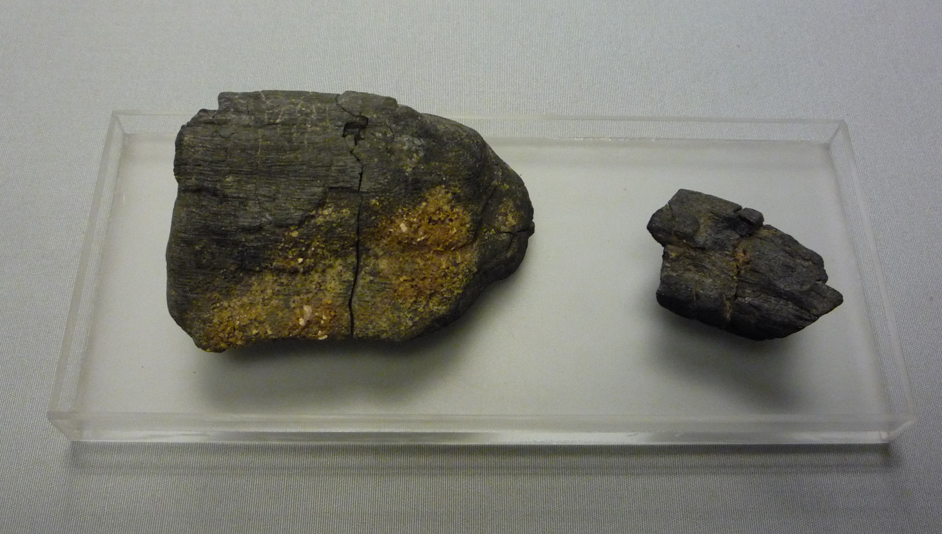
Charcoal fragments, similar to those used in dating Devil's Lair

Carbon 14 dating for charcoal used for dating Devil's Lair, though originally thought impossible due to the high rate of the local vegetation species endemism (65-85%). Charcoal found at the site was compiled and compared with other charcoal samples across the world, using ESEM (Environmental Scanning Electron Microscope), which identified the charcoal as reliable to date. Additionally, local wooded plants intermixed within the charcoal were able to be identified and helped to categorize the dates of inhabitation in reference to climate. The charcoal showed signs of sporadic human inhabitation, with three settlement periods: 24,000 - 17,000 BP (during a drier climate with less vegetation), 12,000 BP (during a period of moist climate and dense vegetation), and 500 - 300 BP (a climate closest to present-day). Earliest occupancy dates, from more detailed carbon 14 dating, mark the earliest dates of occupation of Devil's Lair during 48,000 BP.

=== Lithic analysis ===
There were a total 1,047 stone artefacts recovered from Devil's Lair, of which 82% were attributed to the Last Glacial Maximum (LGM). 111 stone tools were found within the lowest occupation layers. They include adze-like scrapers and flakes, all made of either chert or quartz. Other materials present in the assemblage included opaline, calcrete, and limestone from the cave itself. There is evidence of early use of bipolar flaking technology. Earlier studies hypothesized the use of resin on hafted tools, though sedimentary analysis and lithic analysis contradict this theory; there is inconclusive evidence for both early use of hafted tools and possible use of resin. Radiocarbon dates and stratigraphic analysis (of stratigraphic layers 19-30 upper) of said tools indicate an agreed-upon occupation date of Devil's Lair starting at 31,000 years BP.

=== Human material ===
Human remains of the past inhabitants were found within Devil's Cave, including a hip-bone and a tooth. A male human pelvis was found within Trench 9. Once radiocarbon dated, the pelvis was dated to be 12,000 years old. Found near a hearth, laying on its side, the male pelvis's position could point for further significance. Three human teeth found within the site: a permanent, maxillary central incisor, dated to 8,000 to 12,000 years BP; an upper, left, central deciduous incisor, dated to 17,000 years BP; and child's small incisor, dated to 19,000 ± 500 BP.

=== Ornamentation ===
Excavations at Devil's Lair have yielded early human ornaments in the form of three ground bone beads dating to 19,000–12,700 years BP. These beads were made from the limb-bones of macropods and were manufactured by cutting the bone shafts into short segments and grinding them smooth on abrasive stone. A deliberately perforated but otherwise unmodified stone object with wear patterns suggestive of its use as a pendant dated to 14,000 year BP has also been recovered from Devil's Lair.

These artefacts are some of the earliest evidence of symbolic behaviour in Australia and are internationally significant for understanding the timing and character of the emergence of symbolic capacities in humans.
