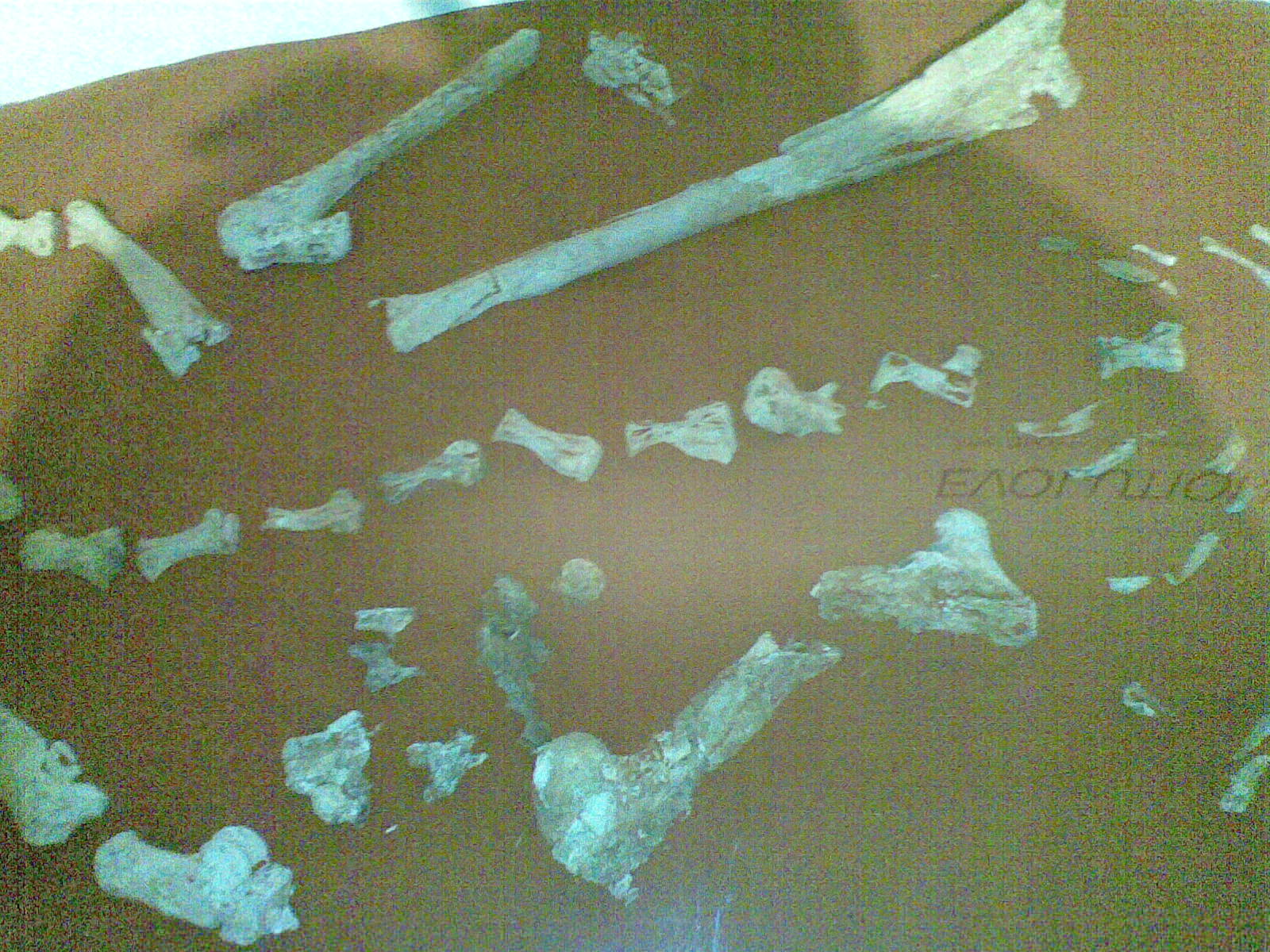
- Disarticulated Sthenurus sp. skeleton at the Museum of Victoria

Scientific classification
- Kingdom: Animalia
- Phylum: Chordata
- Class: Mammalia
- Infraclass: Marsupialia
- Order: Diprotodontia
- Family: Macropodidae
- Subfamily: †Sthenurinae
- Tribe: †Sthenurini
- Genus: †Sthenurus (Owen, 1873a)

Species
- †Sthenurus andersoni; †Sthenurus atlas; †Sthenurus maddocki; †Sthenurus newtonae; †Sthenurus occidentalis; †Sthenurus oreas; †Sthenurus orientalis; †Sthenurus pales; †Sthenurus stirlingi; †Sthenurus tindalei

= Sthenurus =

Sthenurus Temporal range: Pliocene–Pleistocene

Extinct genus of marsupials

Sthenurus ("strong tail") is an extinct genus of kangaroos. With a length around 3 m (10 ft), some species were twice as large as modern extant species. Sthenurus was related to the better-known Procoptodon. The subfamily Sthenurinae is believed to have separated from its sister taxon, the Macropodinae (kangaroos and wallabies), halfway through the Miocene, and then its population grew during the Pliocene.

== Description ==
=== Size ===
The body mass of the largest species is estimated to be 240 kg (530 lb), nearly three times that of the largest extant species.

=== Anatomy ===
The skeletal structure of Sthenurus was very robust with powerful hind limbs, a broad pelvis, a short neck, and longer arms and phalanges than modern species. Their phalanges may have been used to hold stems and twigs. These unique adaptations suited their feeding habits of browsing in the case of S. occidentalis, but other species were most likely grazers.

A morphological difference exists between the scapulae (shoulder blades) of the Sthenurine and the extant and extinct macropodids. Sthenurus had a tail shorter but stronger than present species of kangaroos, and only one toe instead of three like the red kangaroo. At the end of the foot was a small hoof-like nail suited for flat terrain; this toe is considered their fourth toe.

==== Skull ====
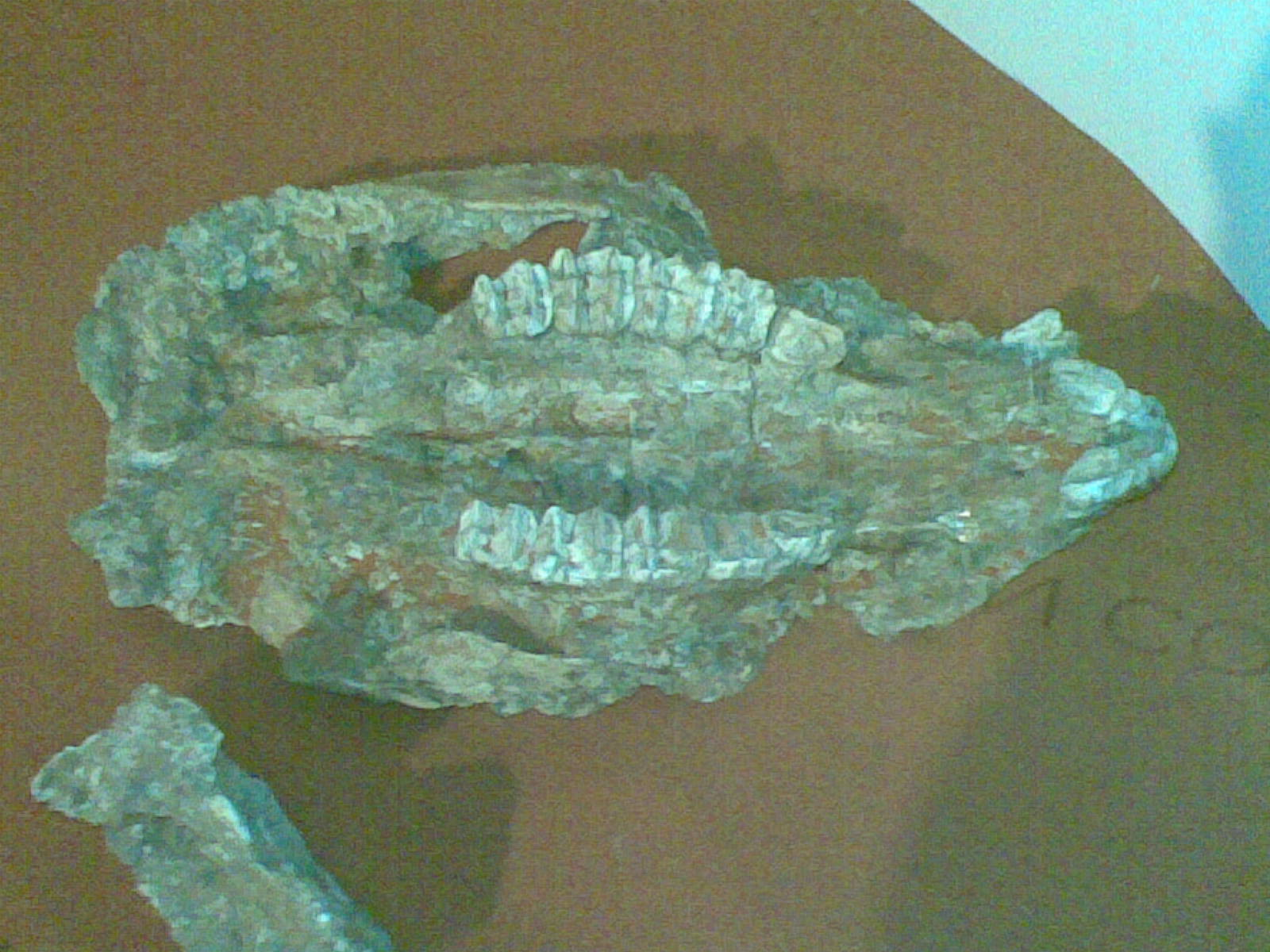
Palatal view of a Sthenurus sp. skull.

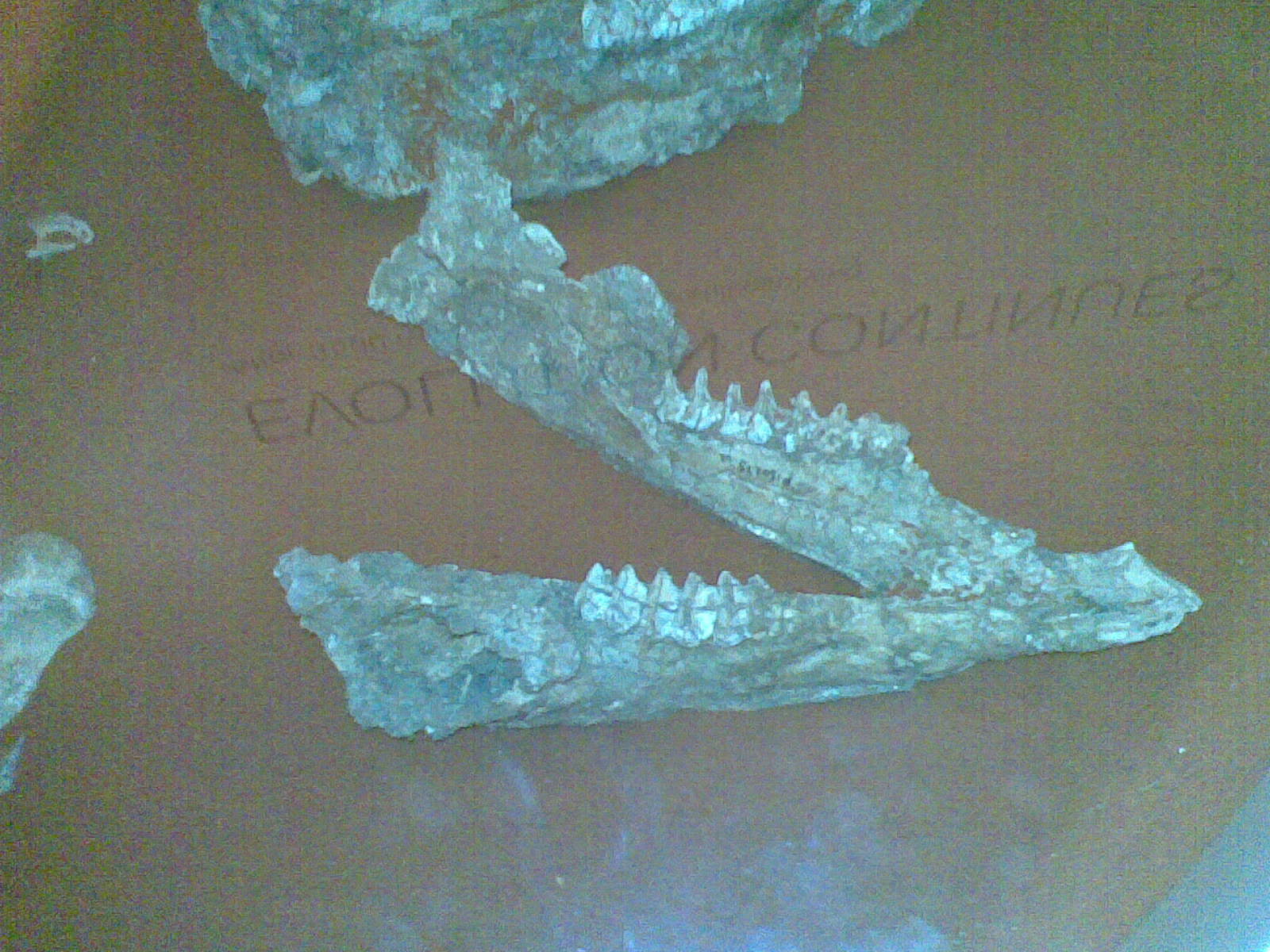
Lower jaw of Sthenurus sp.

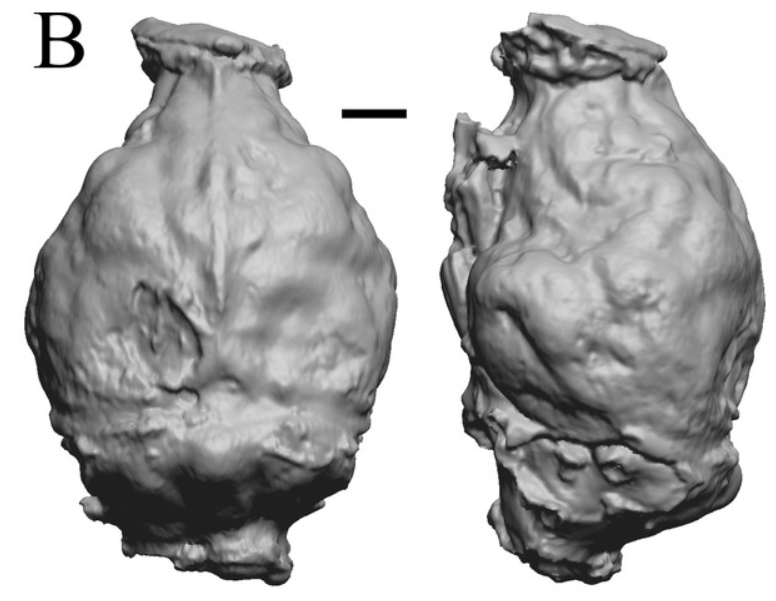
Digital endocast of the cranial cavity of Sthenurus cf. orientalis (FMNH PM 59245).

Sthenurus possessed a short, deep skull, which was suited for stereoscopic vision; this allowed for better depth perception.S. stirlingi had a large, dolichocephalic skull with a more elevated braincase position and an inflamed nasal frontal region in comparison to the contemporaneous skull of S. tindelai. S. andersoni skull fossils show a dome-like forehead that is unique to it among other dolichocephalic sthenurines. This is attributed to the continuous high vaulting of the frontals above the orbits and the line of the rostrum.

==== Dentition ====
The teeth were tough and strongly enamelled, useful for tough vegetation and with a striation pattern. In S. stirlingi, fossil evidence shows that the tooth row curves medially (anteriorly and posteriorly) from a line tangential to the labial side of the molars at the anterior ridge of the masseteric processes. The fossils of teeth may also suggest that the sthenurines and macropodines shared a common ancestor. They share many synapomorphic character states. They each have well-developed lophs on molars and both lack a posthypocristid.

== Locomotion ==
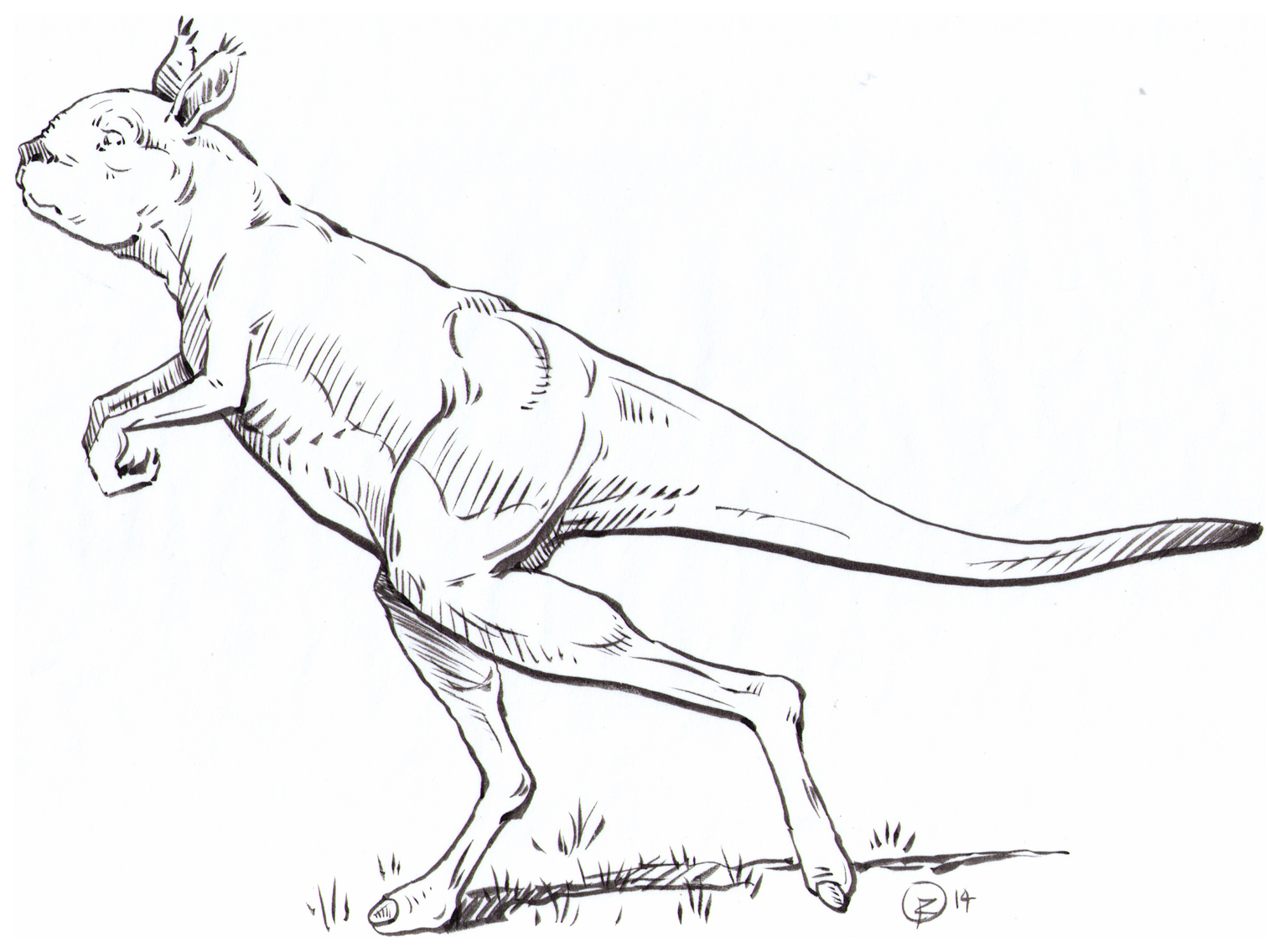
S. stirlingi in a walking pose

Due to their giant height and weight, the largest species possibly did not hop as a form of locomotion, but rather walked bipedally in a similar manner to hominids. This gait would have been used at slow speeds, since hopping at slow speeds would have been inefficient. Pentapedal movement and bipedal hopping no longer seem to have been options for these massive kangaroos.

== Diet ==
A 1997 study analysed the diets of the fauna at various fossil site localities in South Australia, using stable carbon isotope analysis 13C/12C of collagen. It found that at older localities such as Cooper Creek, the species of Sthenurus were adapted to a diet of leaves and twigs (browsing) due to the wet climate of the time between 132 and 108 thousand years ago (kya - by thermoluminescence dating and uranium dating), which allowed for a more varied vegetation cover.

At the Baldina Creek fossil site 30 kya (C14 dating), the genus had transitioned to a diet of grass-grazing. During this time, the area was open grasslands with sparse tree cover as the continent was drier than today, but at Dempsey's Lake (36-25 kya) and Rockey River (19 kya C14 dating), their diet was of both grazing and browsing. This analysis may be because of a wetter climatic period. The overall anatomy of the genus did not alter in response to the change in diet and dentition did not adapt to the varying toughness of the vegetation between grasses, shrubs, and trees.

== Paleoecology ==
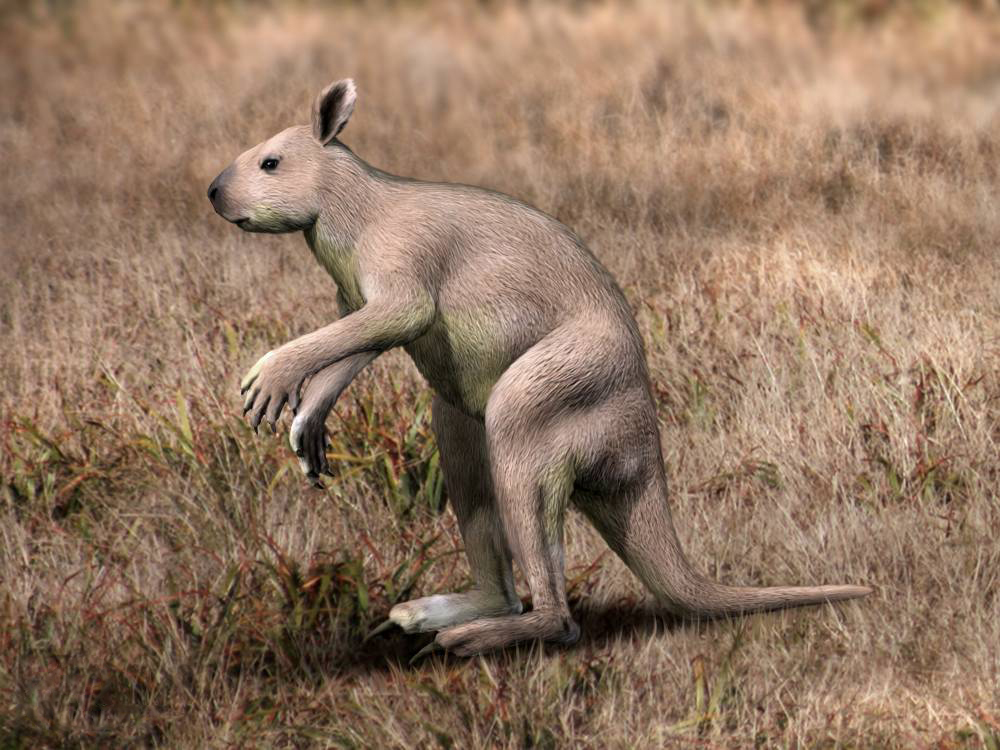
Life restoration

Other animals found in the Cuddie Springs habitat include the flightless bird Genyornis, the red kangaroo, Diprotodon, humans, and many others.

Examination of skeletal remains of Sthenurus from Lake Callabonna, northern South Australia, revealed that as the animals were trapped as they floundered in the clay mud while attempting to cross the floor of the lake during low-water or dry times. The data show that three closely allied sthenurine species coexisted sympatrically at Lake Callabonna: a new giant taxon, S. stirlingi, an intermediate-sized S. tindalei, and the considerably smaller S. andersoni. Comparative osteology of these Sthenurus species with Macropus giganteus emphasizes how different sthenurine kangaroos were from extant kangaroos, especially with the sthenurines' short, deep skulls, long front feet with very reduced lateral digits, and the monodactyl hind feet.

Teapot Creek, a tributary of the MacLaughlin River in the Southern Monaro, southeastern New South Wales, contains a sequence of terraces. The highest and oldest of these terraces was reported to contain the remains of fossil mammals found in Plio-Pleistocene fossil deposits elsewhere in eastern Australia. Sthenurus atlas, S. occidentalis, and S. newtonae are some of the species identified from the fossils found in the terrace.

== Human interaction ==
From evidence gathered at Cuddie Springs, Native Australians inhabited the same habitat as that of Sthenurus and various other extant and extinct species of animals. At this locality, a lack of any specific tools suitable for hunting seems to occur. Instead, tools used to cut meat off the bone and blood residue left on the stone tools were found. Any material made of wood for hunting, such as the boomerang and spear, has either not survived intact or was not used by the people of the time in this locality. While this evidence may suggest that human contact with Sthenurus spp. and the remainder of the Australian megafauna could have caused the extinction of these mammals, some studies show the extinction was probably under way before human contact. Sthenurus spp. were herbivores, and when a great climate change began to occur, they did not change their eating habits. This probably had a much larger impact on this particular genus regarding extinction.
