= Ernest Lundelius =

American paleontologist

Ernest L. Lundelius is a vertebrate paleontologist who has conducted research in the United States and Australia. Lundelius retired as professor emeritus at the Jackson School of Geosciences of the University of Texas. He was awarded a Fulbright Fellowship in the mid 1950s, the earliest part of his career, to undertake research on geologically recent vertebrate fauna in Western Australia, examining and describing fossils from the Pleistocene epoch and later. In 2008 Lundelius was distinguished by the Texas Academy of Sciences as their scientist of the year.
