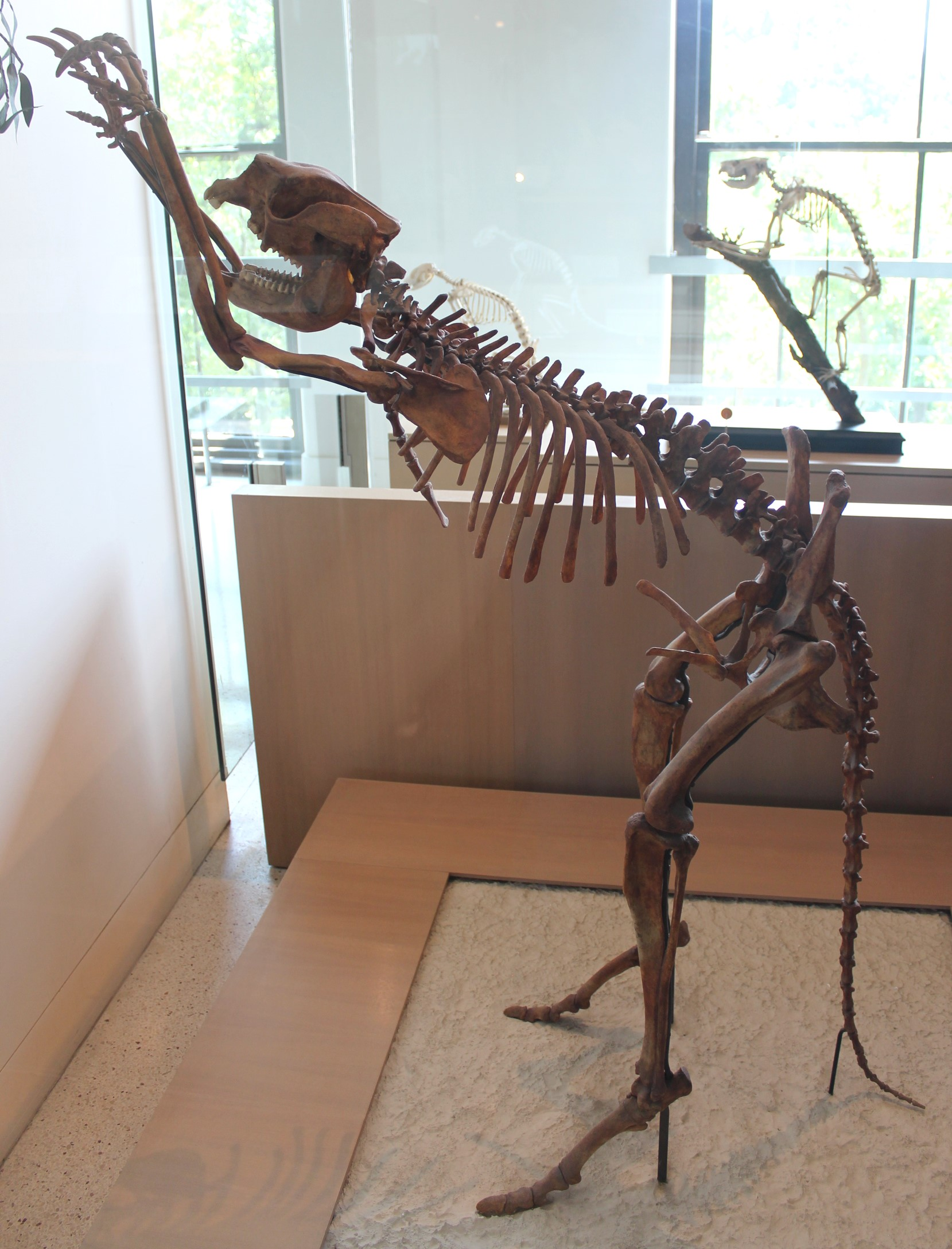
- S. occidentalis skeleton at American Museum of Natural History

Scientific classification
- Kingdom: Animalia
- Phylum: Chordata
- Class: Mammalia
- Infraclass: Marsupialia
- Order: Diprotodontia
- Family: Macropodidae
- Genus: †Simosthenurus; Tedford, 1966

Species
- S. maddocki S. occidentalis S. antiquus S. baileyi S. brachyselenis S. eurykaphus S. pales S. tirarensis S. orientalis

= Simosthenurus =

Simosthenurus Temporal range: Pleistocene

Extinct genus of marsupials

Simosthenurus, also referred to as the short-faced kangaroo, is an extinct genus of megafaunal macropods that existed in Australia during the Pleistocene. Analysis of Simosthenurus fossils has contributed to the finding that there are three lineages of macropods: Sthenurinae, Macropodinae, and Lagostrophinae. The genus Simosthenurus was among the sthenurines.

The two most documented members of the genus are S. maddocki and S. occidentalis, though other species have also been discovered.

== Palaeobiology ==
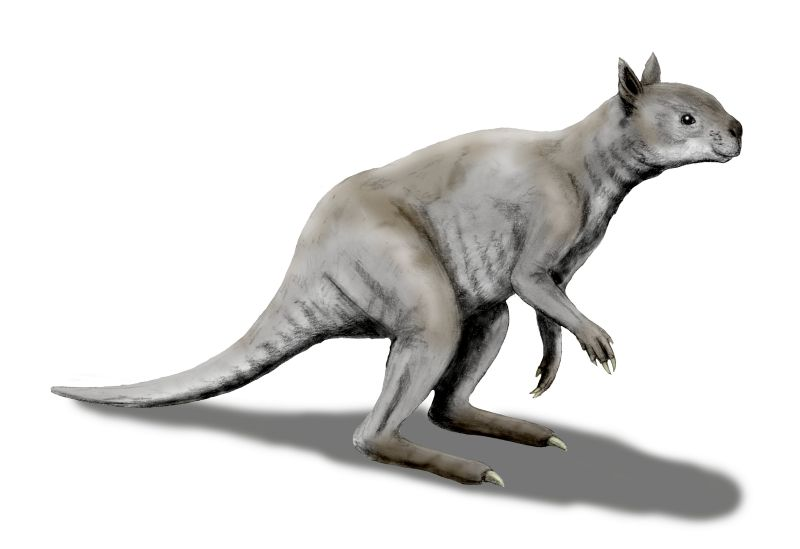
Restoration of S. occidentalis

Osteological information (predominantly cave floor surface finds) has yielded that Simosthenurus is part of the same family as that of modern kangaroos. However, modern kangaroos are plantigrade hoppers, using jumping as their means of locomotion, while Simosthenurus was a bipedal unguligrade, walking in a manner similar to that of hominids. Although members of Simosthenurus were no taller than most modern species of kangaroo, their robust bones, broad pelvis, long arms and short necks were unique adaptations to their browsing mode of feeding. They had single-toed hind feet had small hoof-like nails more typical of animals adapted to moving over relatively flat terrain. Simosthenurus is a highly distinct lineage of macropods, with no living descendants. However, it is possible that their closest living cousin is the banded hare-wallaby, which is now restricted to small isolated islands off the coast of Western Australia.

=== S. occidentalis ===
S. occidentalis mtDNA sequences were obtained from fossils in Tasmanian caves; the fossils yielded radiocarbon dates between 46,000 and 50,000 years ago. The sequences obtained in this study were from fossils much older than any Australian fossils that previously yielded sequences.

The type specimen was collected by E. A. Le Souef and noted in a report to the state's Caves Board, then revised and published by Ludwig Glauert as Sthenurus occidentalis in 1910. This holotype is fossil material preserving the left and right dentary of an adult found at Mammoth Cave in Southwest Australia. The specific epithet occidentalis, meaning "of the west", refers to the discovery of this species in Western Australia.

==== Description ====
S. occidentalis was a leaf-eating marsupial, about the size of a modern grey kangaroo, though far more robust, with adults estimated to be about 118 kg. The species has been suggested to have used a bipedal striding gait when moving slowly. This is unlike modern kangaroos, which use pentapedal motion, or 'punting', pushing off their tail and forelimbs and swinging their hindlimbs forward when moving slowly. It is thought that, by rearing up on their hind limbs and using their long arms and fingers, they could reach overhead to grasp high leaves and branches and pull them down to their mouth. They then would use their powerful jaws and striated teeth to grind the tough leaves.

A mid-sized species of Simosthenurus, known as 'short-faced' kangaroos, one of several genera in a macropodid lineage that diversified in Pliocene Australia. The mass of adults is estimated to have around 118 kilograms, standing at a similar height to larger modern roos but with a heavier and more robust body. The dentition contains molars set close to the jaw, which combined with the cranial structure, strongly indicates an animal capable of consuming tough vegetation. The short jaw and facial anatomy clearly distinguishes their appearance from the surviving lineage of kangaroos, which usually graze on grasses rather than a browsing diet, and more closely resembles the habits of the modern koala Phascolarctos cinereus.

A set of powerful molars located close to the hinge of jaw, similar to but further back than a koala, improved the mechanical advantage and a potential enlargement of the zygomaticomandibularis muscles would have reduced the hazard of dislocation while biting with the rear molars. Modelling of the bite force and the skulls resistance to torsional forces suggests that the species was able to consume tough material, such as leaves, bark and branches, that could be torn with the claws of the long forelimbs. The diamond-like shape of the forehead and reinforced cheek bones was able to distribute the forces applied by large muscles to the rear molars at one side of the jaw, strongly suggesting that browsing habit included an ability to tear and chew hardy and fibrous material. The morphology of the skull and dentition was found to be most comparable to Asian mammal Ailuropoda melanoleuca (panda), an animal that primarily feeds as a browser of tough plant material.

==== Distribution and habitat ====
The species is represented in the records of many southern fossil sites in Australia, including Tasmania. The type locality is located in Southwest Australia, at Mammoth Cave, and evidence from another site in the southwest indicates it existed until about 42,000 years ago. Fossils assigned to the species have been obtained at sites in the Southwest, southern regions of Central Australia and the southeast of the continent. In Tasmania S. occidentalis has been identified at fossil sites in the northeast and central regions, the species has also been found at the nearby King Island.

Their distribution in the Pleistocene is dated to late-middle to late deposits.

=== S. maddocki ===
An adult S. maddocki was smaller than S. occidentalis, weighing only 78 kg. Like some other species from the same time period, they were apparently highly selective feeders. Local records indicate that the species was mainly located in southeastern Australia. It is uncommon to find fossils of this rare species, especially when compared to other Sthenurines.

== Extinction ==
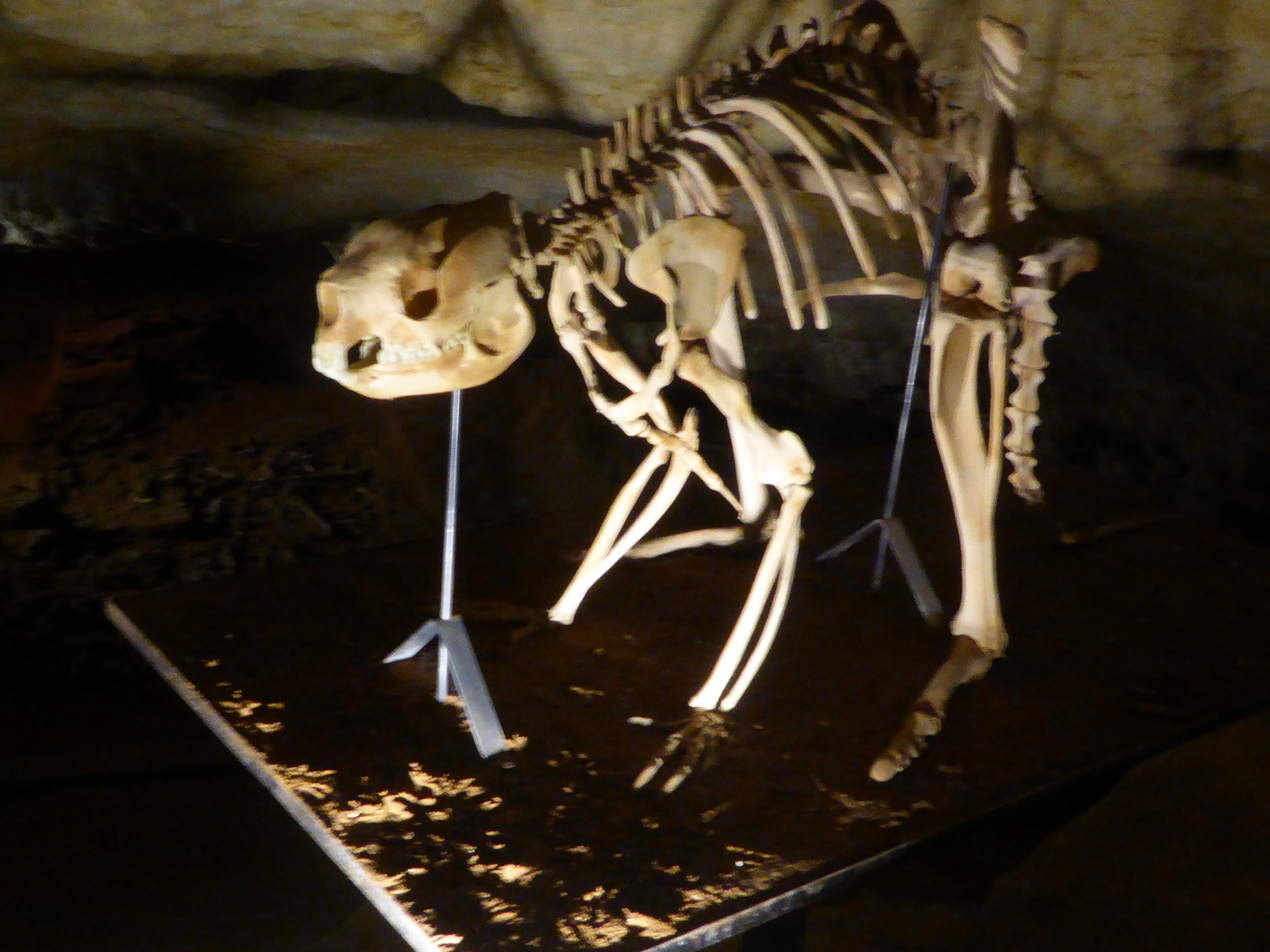
S. occidentalis skeleton, Victoria Fossil Cave

There are several proposed causes of the extinction of Simosthenurus. The two most popular hypotheses include human involvement and climate change.

=== Human impact ===
One theory postulates that human impact caused it. There are fewer extinct megafaunal Tasmanian species compared to those of continental Australia. This is most likely due to humans arriving in mainland Australia first. The extinction of Simosthenurus may be attributable to human over-hunting or habitat alteration. However, there is no archaeological evidence for interactions with humans, and the overlap of habitation in Australia and Tasmania of both humans and Simothenurus species, if there was one, would have been relatively short.

=== Climate change ===
Another theory is that climate change caused the extinction of this genus. The last glacial period, popularly known as the Ice Age, has been linked with a severe reduction in several megafaunal populations, including Simosthenurus.
