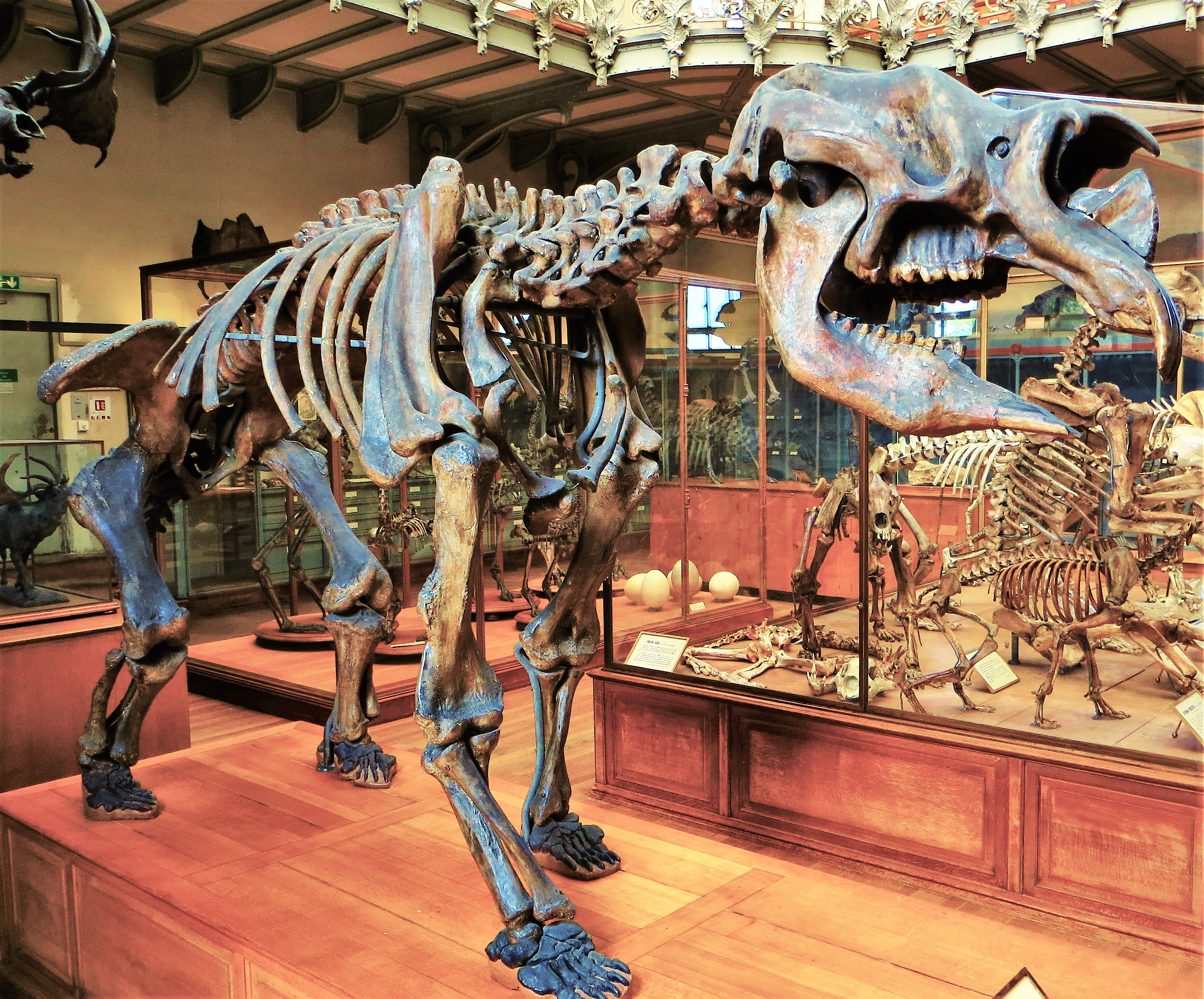
- Diprotodon skeleton cast, MNHN, Paris
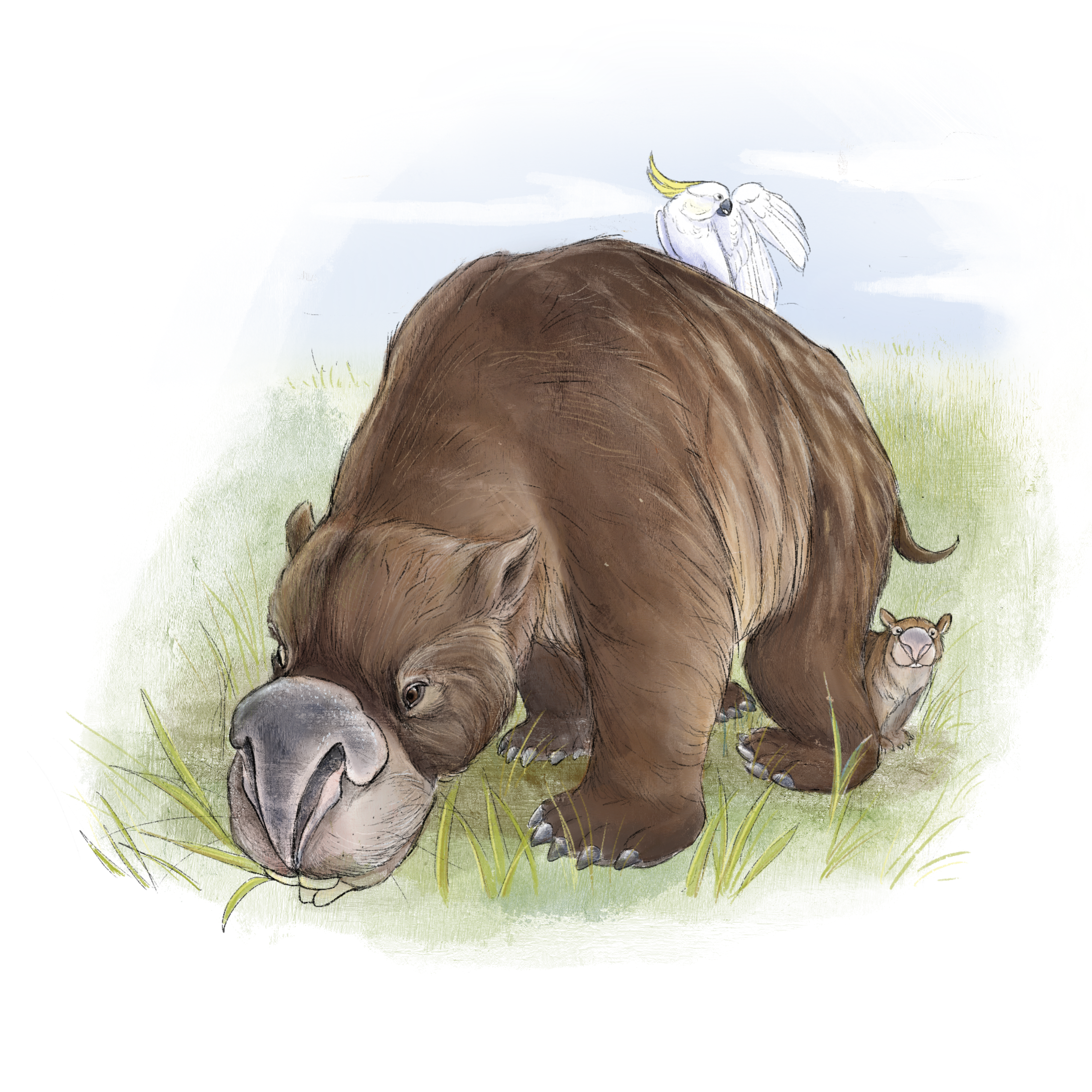
- Illustration of a female Diprotodon with joey and sulphur-crested cockatoo

Scientific classification
- Kingdom: Animalia
- Phylum: Chordata
- Class: Mammalia
- Infraclass: Marsupialia
- Order: Diprotodontia
- Family: †Diprotodontidae
- Genus: †Diprotodon

Type species
- Diprotodon optatum Owen, 1838

Synonyms
- D. australis Owen, 1844; D. annextans McCoy, 1861; D. minor Huxley, 1862; D. longiceps McCoy, 1865; D. bennettii Krefft, 1873; D. loderi Krefft, 1873; D. optatus Woods, 1960; D. australe Molnar & Kurz, 1997

= Diprotodon =

Diprotodon Temporal range: Pleistocene, 1.77/0.78–0.04 Ma

Extinct marsupial genus

Diprotodon, from Ancient Greek δί- (dí-), meaning "two", πρῶτος (prôtos), meaning "first", and ὀδούς (odoús), meaning "tooth", is an extinct genus of diprotodontid marsupial from the Pleistocene of Australia containing one species, D. optatum. The earliest finds date to 1.77 million to 780,000 years ago, but most specimens are dated to after 110,000 years ago. Its remains were first unearthed in 1830, in Wellington Caves, New South Wales, and contemporary paleontologists guessed they belonged to rhinos, elephants, hippos or dugongs.

Diprotodon was formally described by English naturalist Richard Owen in 1838, and was the first named Australian fossil mammal. This led Owen to become the foremost authority of his time on other marsupials and Australian megafauna, which were enigmatic to European science.

Diprotodon is the largest-known marsupial to have ever lived; it greatly exceeds the size of its closest living relatives wombats and koalas. It is a member of the extinct family Diprotodontidae, which includes other large quadruped herbivores. It grew to 1.8 m (5 ft 11 in) at the shoulders, over 4 m (13 ft) from head to tail, and likely weighed several tonnes, possibly as much as 3,500 kg (7,700 lb). Females were smaller than males. Diprotodon supported itself on elephant-like legs to travel long distances, and inhabited most of Australia. The digits were weak; most of the weight was probably borne on the wrists and ankles. The hindpaws angled inward at 130°. Its jaws may have produced a strong bite force of 2,300 newtons (520 pounds-force) at the long and ever-growing incisor teeth, and over 11,000 newtons (2,500 lb_{f}) at the last molar. Such powerful jaws would have allowed it to eat vegetation in bulk, crunching and grinding plant materials such as twigs, buds and leaves of woody plants with its bilophodont teeth.

It is the only marsupial and metatherian that is known to have made seasonal migrations. Large herds, usually of females, seem to have marched through a wide range of habitats to find food and water, walking at around 6 km/h (3.7 mph). Diprotodon may have formed polygynous societies, possibly using its powerful incisors to fight for mates or fend off predators, such as the largest-known marsupial carnivore Thylacoleo carnifex. Being a marsupial, the mother may have raised her joey in a pouch on her belly. Its pouch would have possibly faced backwards, as in wombats, to which it is related.

Diprotodon went extinct about 40,000 years ago as part of the Late Pleistocene megafauna extinctions, along with every other Australian mammal over 100 kg (220 lb). The extinction was possibly caused by extreme drought conditions and predation pressure from the first Aboriginal Australians, who likely co-existed with Diprotodon and other megafauna in Australia for several thousand years prior to its extinction. There is little direct evidence of interactions between Aboriginal Australians and Diprotodon. Diprotodon has been thought by some authors to have been the origin of some aboriginal mythological figures—most notably the bunyip—and aboriginal rock artworks, but these ideas are unconfirmed.

== Research history ==
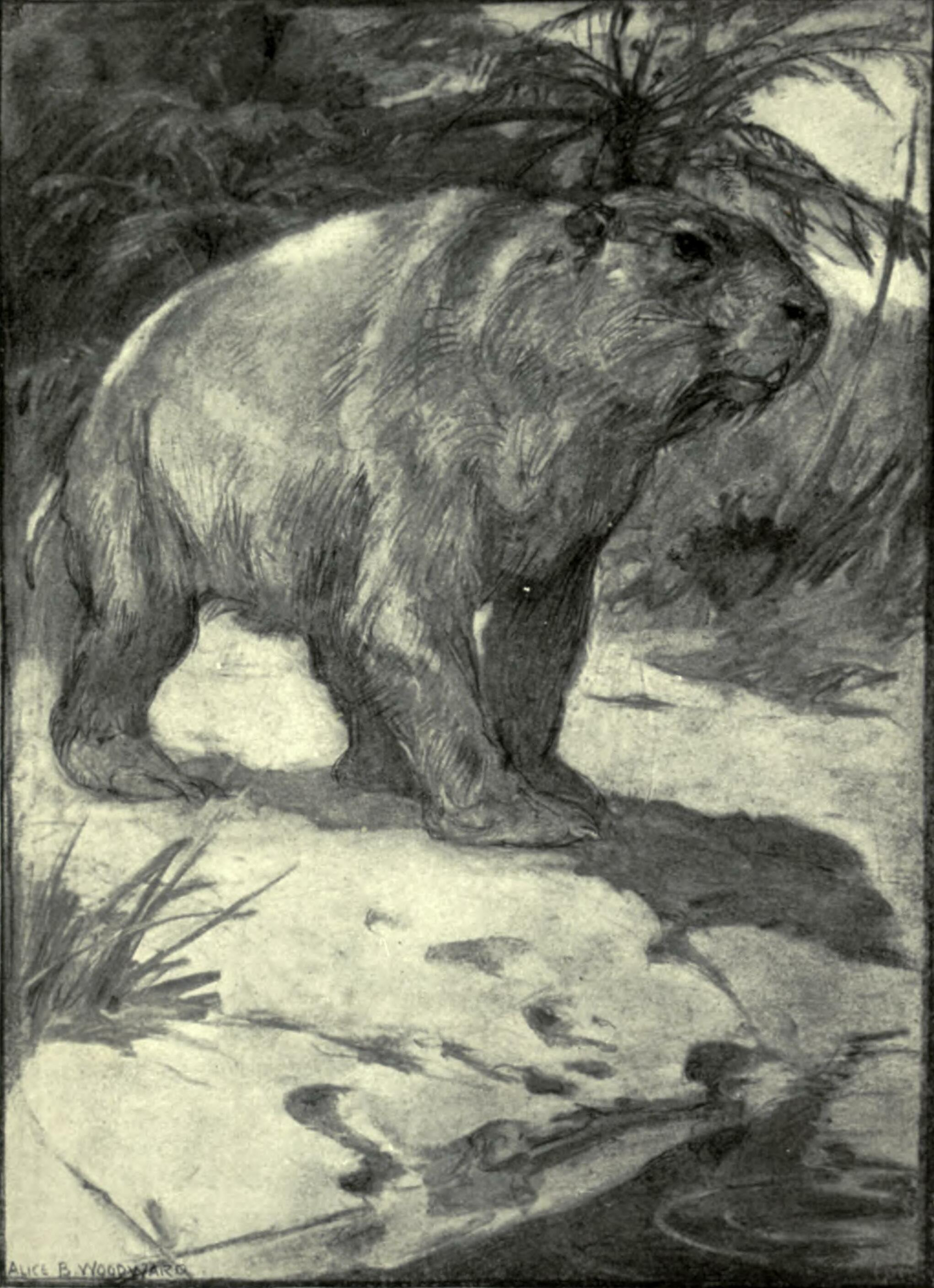
Early reconstruction of Diprotodon by Alice B. Woodward, 1912

In 1830, farmer George Ranken found a diverse fossil assemblage while exploring Wellington Caves, New South Wales, Australia. This was the first major site of extinct Australian megafauna. Remains of Diprotodon were excavated when Ranken later returned as part of a formal expedition that was headed by explorer Major Thomas Mitchell.

At the time these massive fossils were discovered, it was generally thought they were remains of rhinos, elephants, hippos, or dugongs. The fossils were not formally described until Mitchell took them in 1837 to his former colleague English naturalist Richard Owen while in England publishing his journal. In 1838, while studying a piece of a right mandible with an incisor, Owen compared the tooth to those of wombats and hippos; he wrote to Mitchell designating it as a new genus Diprotodon. Mitchell published the correspondence in his journal. Owen formally described Diprotodon in Volume 2 without mentioning a species; in Volume 1, however, he listed the name Diprotodon optatum, making that the type species.

Diprotodon means "two protruding front teeth" in Ancient Greek and optatum is Latin for "desire" or "wish". It was the first-ever Australian fossil mammal to be described. (Note: Owen, and other naturalists of the time would use Diprotodon, and the other unusual extinct creatures of Wellington Cave and the Australian continent to deconstruct progressive creationist arguments. These claimed that God created certain forms to exist in certain environments and time periods, based on the fossils of modern animals such as hyenas – which are today found only in Africa – but were being unearthed in every other continent. This was confounded by Diprotodon and more of Owen's taxa because they were found nowhere else, and more-typical animals were not found in Australia either, despite the Australian climate's similarity to that of Africa. Owen nonetheless disagreed with Charles Darwin's theory of natural selection.) In 1844, Owen replaced the name D. optatum with "D. australis". Owen only once used the name optatum and the acceptance of its apparent replacement "australis" has historically varied widely but optatum is now standard.

In 1843, Mitchell was sent more Diprotodon fossils from the recently settled Darling Downs and relayed them to Owen. With these, Owen surmised that Diprotodon was an elephant related to or synonymous with Mastodon or Deinotherium, pointing to the incisors which he interpreted as tusks, the flattening (anteroposterior compression) of the femur similar to the condition in elephants and rhinos, and the raised ridges of the molar characteristic of elephant teeth. Later that year, he formally synonymised Diprotodon with Deinotherium as Dinotherium Australe, which he recanted in 1844 after German naturalist Ludwig Leichhardt pointed out that the incisors clearly belong to a marsupial. Owen still classified the molars from Wellington as Mastodon australis and continued to describe Diprotodon as likely elephantine.

In 1847, a nearly complete skull and skeleton was recovered from the Darling Downs, the latter confirming this elephantine characterisation. The massive skeleton attracted a large audience while on public display in Sydney. (Note: The specimen was collected by R. B. Turner at Kings Creek, Queensland, and was taken to Sydney in 1847 to be sold at auction. Leichhardt attempted to buy it for the new Australian Museum but Scottish entrepreneur Benjamin Boyd outbid him at £50. After being examined by Leichhardt, English geologist Reverend William Branwhite Clarke, and curator William Sheridan Wall, it was shipped to England but the ship was wrecked off the Sussex coast. Only the skull was saved; it was taken to Owen.) Leichhardt believed the animal was aquatic, and in 1844 he said it might still be alive in an undiscovered tropical area nearer the interior. But, as the European land exploration of Australia progressed, he became certain it was extinct. Owen later become the foremost authority of Australian palaeontology of his time, mostly working with marsupials.

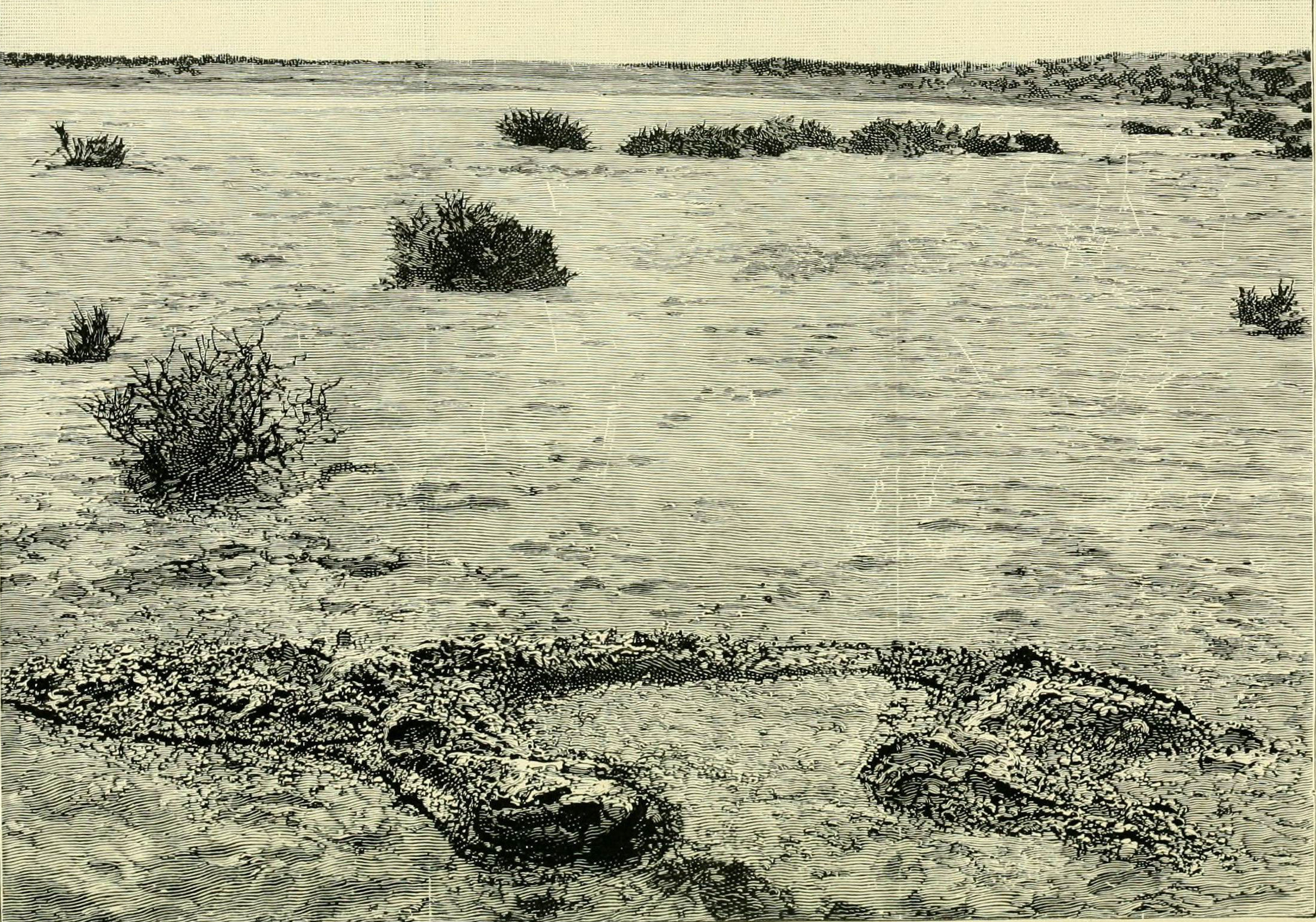
Illustration of a Diprotodon fossil in the dry lakebed of Lake Callabonna

Huge assemblages of mostly-complete Diprotodon fossils have been unearthed in dry lakes and riverbeds. (Note: The large assemblages of fossils in riverbeds are evidence that Diprotodon was a herding species.) The largest known assemblage came from Lake Callabonna, South Australia. Fossils were first noticed here by an aboriginal stockman working on a sheep property to the east. The owners, the Ragless brothers, notified the South Australian Museum, which hired Australian geologist Henry Hurst, who reported an enormous wealth of fossil material and was paid £250 in 1893 to excavate the site. Hurst found up to 360 Diprotodon individuals over a few acres; excavation was restarted in the 1970s and more were uncovered. American palaeontologist Richard H. Tedford said multiple herds of these animals had at different times become stuck in mud while crossing bodies of water while water levels were low during dry seasons.

In addition to D. optatum, several other species were erected in the 19th century, often from single specimens, on the basis of subtle anatomical variations. Among the variations was size difference: adult Diprotodon specimens have two distinct size ranges. In their 1975 review of Australian fossil mammals, Australian palaeontologists J. A. Mahoney and William David Lindsay Ride did not ascribe this to sexual dimorphism, because males and females of modern wombat and koala species—its closest living relatives—are skeletally indistinguishable, (Note: Because joeys develop mostly outside the mother's womb, female marsupials do not require the adaptations to the skeleton that placentals need to survive gestation and childbirth, equating to few or no skeletal differences between males and females. In modern wombats, the female can be slightly but insignificantly larger than the male. In koalas, males can be 50% larger than females.) so they assumed the same would have been true for extinct relatives, including Diprotodon.

These other species are:

- D. annextans was erected in 1861 by Irish palaeontologist Frederick McCoy based on some teeth and a partial mandible found near Colac, Victoria; the name may be a typo of annectens, which means linking or joining, because he characterised the species as combining traits from Diprotodon and Nototherium;
- D. minor was erected in 1862 by Thomas Huxley based on a partial palate; in 1991, Australian palaeontologist Peter Murray suggested classifying large specimens as D. optatum and smaller ones as "D. minor";
- D. longiceps was erected in 1865 by McCoy as a replacement for "D. annextans";
- D. bennettii was erected in 1873 by German naturalist Gerard Krefft based on a nearly complete mandible collected by naturalists George Bennet and Georgina King near Gowrie, New South Wales; and
- D. loderi was erected in 1873 by Krefft based on a partial palate collected by Andrew Loder near Murrurundi, New South Wales.

In 2008, Australian palaeontologist Gilbert Price opted to recognise only one species D. optatum based most-notably on a lack of dental differences among these supposed species, and said it was likely Diprotodon was indeed sexually dimorphic, with the male probably being the larger form.

== Classification ==
=== Phylogeny ===
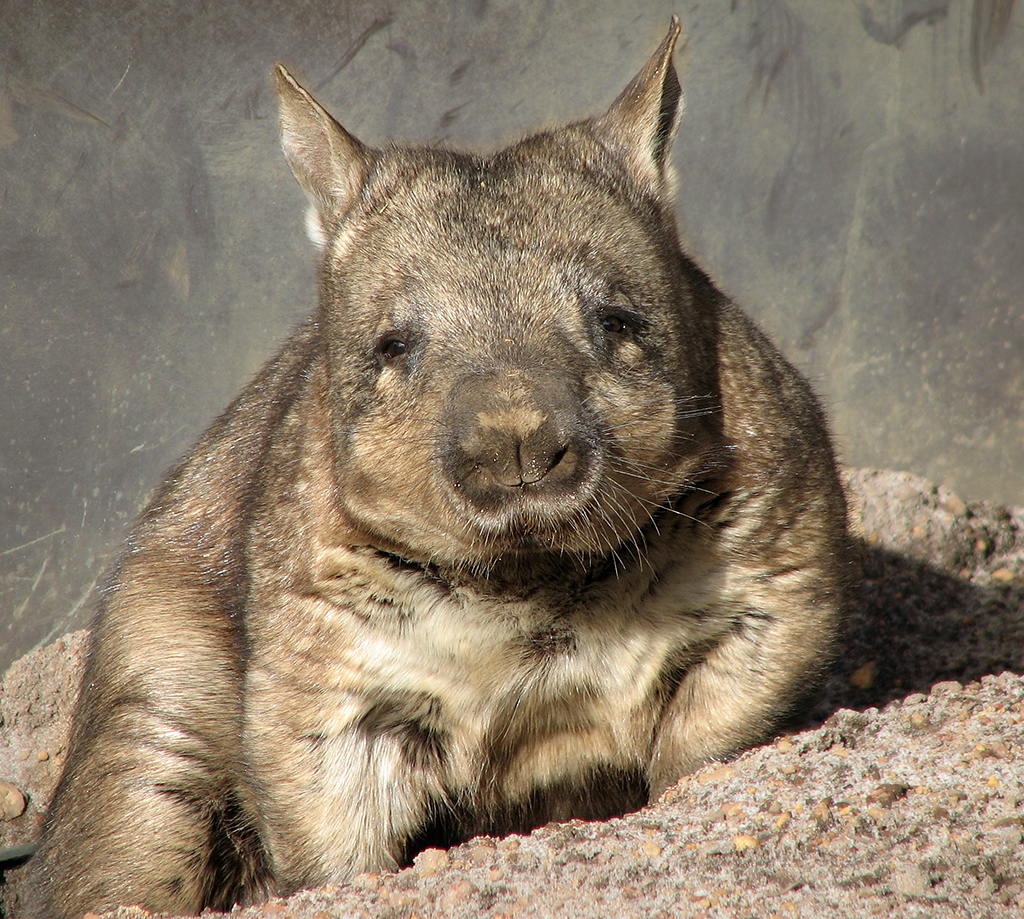
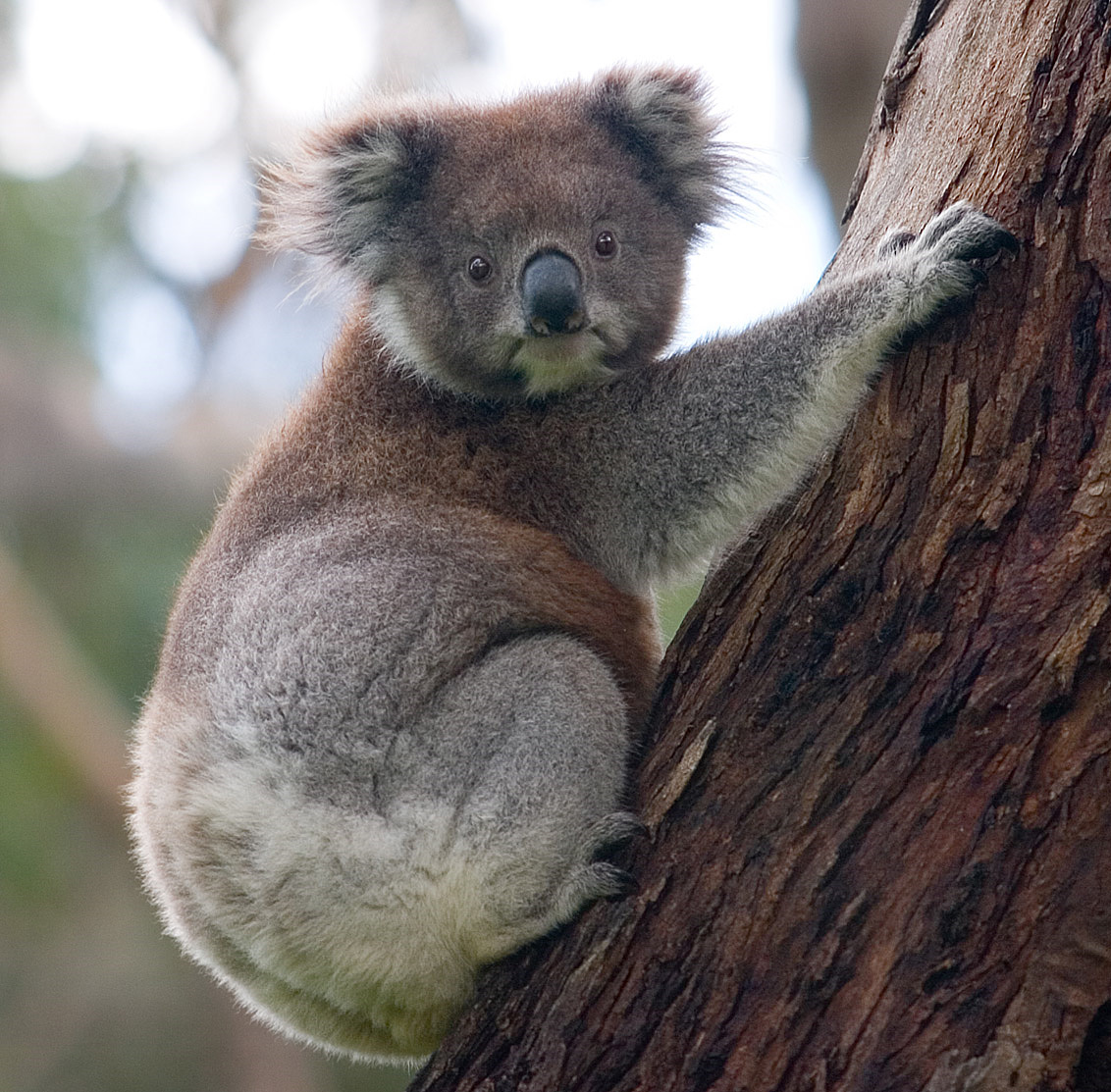
Diprotodon's closest living relatives are wombats (left) and koalas (right)

Diprotodon is a marsupial in the order Diprotodontia, (Note: In 1868, Owen classified all marsupials (living or extinct) into either the orders Polyprotodontia (characterised by multiple pairs of mandibular incisors) or Diprotodontia (a single pair of mandibular incisors). The name Diprotodontia does not derive from Diprotodon. Marsupialia is divided into several orders, of which Diprotodontia is the largest.) suborder Vombatiformes (wombats and koalas), and infraorder Vombatomorphia (wombats and allies). It is unclear how different groups of vombatiformes are related to each other, because the best-known members (living or extinct) are exceptionally derived (highly specialised forms that are quite different from their last common ancestor).

In 1872, American mammalogist Theodore Gill erected the superfamily Diprotodontoidea and family Diprotodontidae to house Diprotodon. New species were later added to both groups; by the 1960s, the first diprotodontoids dating to before the Pliocene were discovered, better clarifying their relationship to each other. Because of this, in 1967, American palaeontologist Ruben A. Stirton subdivided Diprotodontoidea into one family, Diprotodontidae, with four subfamilies; Diprotodontinae (containing Diprotodon among others), Nototheriinae, Zygomaturinae, and Palorchestinae. In 1977, Australian palaeontologist Michael Archer synonymised Nototheriinae with Diprotodontinae. In 1978, Archer and Australian palaeontologist Alan Bartholomai elevated Palorchestinae to family level as Palorchestidae, leaving Diprotodontoidea with families Diprotodontidae and Palorchestidae; and Diprotodontidae with subfamilies Diprotodontinae and Zygomaturinae.

Below is the Diprotodontoidea family tree according to Australian palaeontologists Karen H. Black and Brian Mackness, 1999 (top), and Vombatiformes family tree according to Beck et al. 2020 (bottom):

- Diprotodontoidea
  - Palorchestidae
  - Diprotodontidae
    - Diprotodontinae
      - - Ngapakaldia
        - Pitikantia
      - - Bematherium
        - - Pyramios
          - - - Meniscolophus
              - Euowenia
            - - Euryzygoma
              - Diprotodon
    - Zygomaturinae
      - Silvabestius
      - - Alkwertatherium
        - - Nimbadon
          - - - Plaisiodon
              - Kolopsoides
            - - Neohelos
              - - Kolopsis
                - - - Maokopia
                    - Hulitherium
                  - Zygomaturus

- Vombatiformes
  - Thylacoleonidae
  - - Phascolarctidae (koalas)
    - Vombatomorphia
      - Vombatidae (wombats)
      - Diprotodontoidea
        - Ngapakaldia
        - - - Nimbadon
            - Neohelos
          - - Palorchestidae
            - Diprotodontidae
              - Kolopsis
              - - Diprotodon
                - - Euryzygoma
                  - Zygomaturus

=== Evolution ===
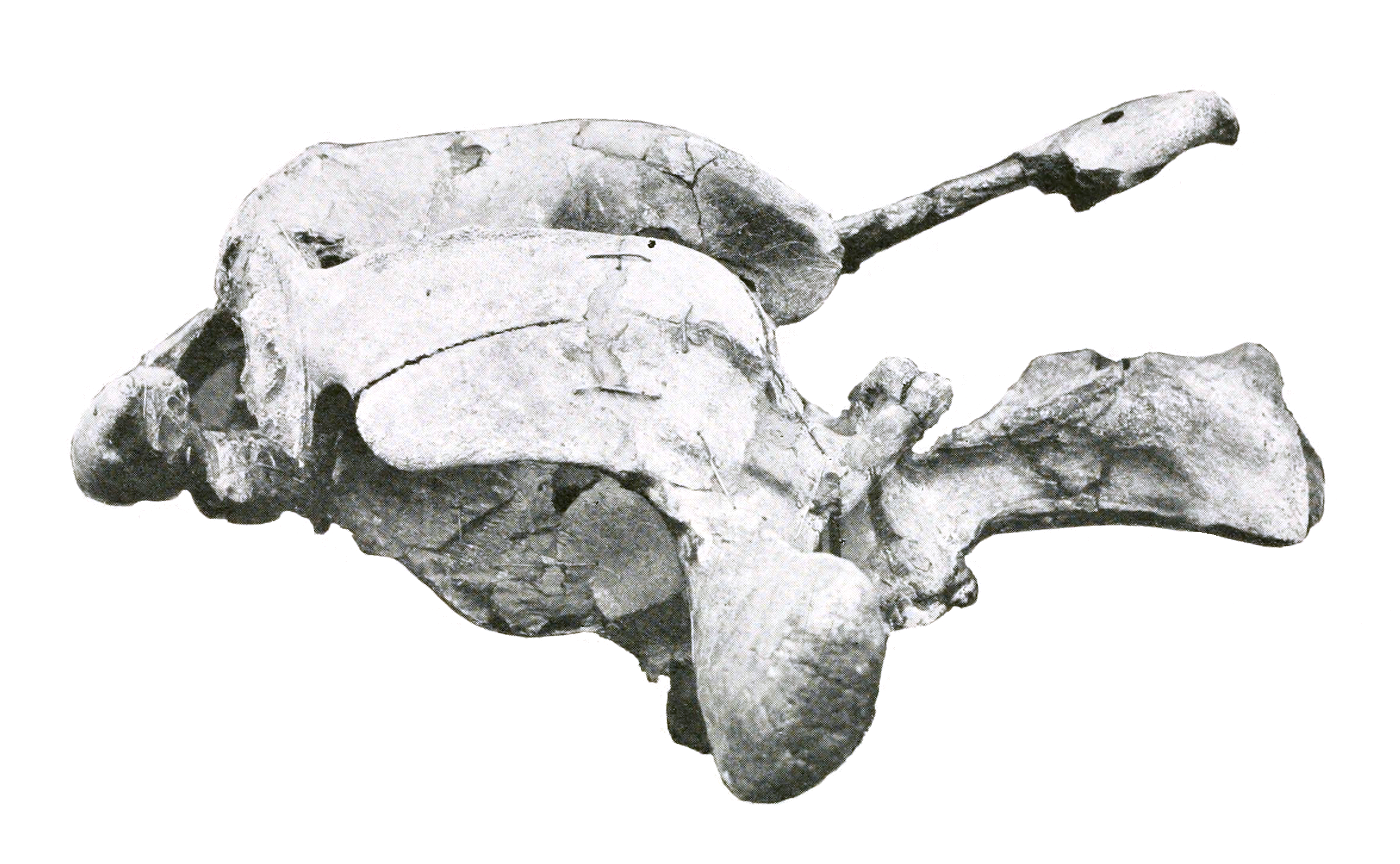
Diprotodon may have evolved from Euryzygoma (skull above).

Diprotodontidae is the most diverse family in Vombatomorphia; it was better adapted to the spreading dry, open landscapes over the last tens of millions of years than other groups in the infraorder, living or extinct. Diprotodon has been found in every Australian state, making it the most-widespread Australian megafauna in the fossil record. (Note: This does not necessarily indicate its dominance among Australian megafauna, because the bones of Diprotodon are enormous and incredibly robust, and are thus far more likely to fossilise and be discovered than those of other megafauna.) The oldest vombatomorph (and vombatiform) is Mukupirna, which was identified in 2020 from Oligocene deposits of the South Australian Namba Formation dating to 26–25 million years ago. The group probably evolved much earlier. Mukupirna was already differentiated as a closer relative to wombats than other vombatiformes, and attained a massive size of roughly 150 kg (330 lb), whereas the last common ancestor of vombatiformes was probably a small, 1–5.5 kg (2.2–12.1 lb) creature.

Both diprotodontines and zygomaturines were both apparently quite diverse over the Late Oligocene to Early Miocene, roughly 23 million years ago. However, the familial and subfamilial classifications of diprotodontoids from this period are debated. Compared to zygomaturines, diprotodontines were rare during the Miocene, with the only identified genus being Pyramios. By the Late Miocene, diprotodontians became the commonest marsupial order in fossil sites, a dominance that endures to the present day; the most-prolific diprotodontians have been diprotodontids and kangaroos. Diprotodontidae also began a gigantism trend, along with several other marsupials, probably in response to the lower-quality plant foods available in a drying climate, requiring them to consume much more. Gigantism appears to have evolved independently six times among the vombatiform lineages. Diprotodontine diversity returned in the Pliocene; Diprotodontidae reached peak diversity with seven genera, coinciding with the spread of open forests. In 1977, Archer said Diprotodon directly evolved from the smaller Euryzygoma, which has been discovered in Pliocene deposits of eastern Australia predating 2.5 million years ago.

In general, there is poor resolution on the ages of Australian fossil sites. While the geochronology of Diprotodon is one of best for Australian megafauna, it is still incomplete and the majority of remains are undated. Price and Australian palaeontologist Katarzyna Piper reported the earliest, indirectly dated Diprotodon fossils from the Nelson Bay Formation at Nelson Bay, New South Wales, which dates to 1.77 million to 780,000 years ago during the Early Pleistocene. These remains are 8–17% smaller than those of Late Pleistocene Diprotodon, but are otherwise indistinguishable. (Note: They were unsure if it was appropriate to classify the Nelson Bay material into a new species based on the size and temporal difference, so they tentatively designated them as D. ?optatum.) The oldest directly dated Diprotodon fossils come from the Boney Bite site at Floraville, New South Wales; they were deposited approximately 340,000 years ago during the Middle Pleistocene based on U-series dating and luminescence dating of quartz and orthoclase. Floraville is the only-identified Middle Pleistocene site in tropical northern Australia. Beyond these, almost all dated Diprotodon material comes from Marine Isotope Stage 5 (MIS5) or younger, that is, after 110,000 years ago during the Late Pleistocene.

== Description ==
=== Skull ===
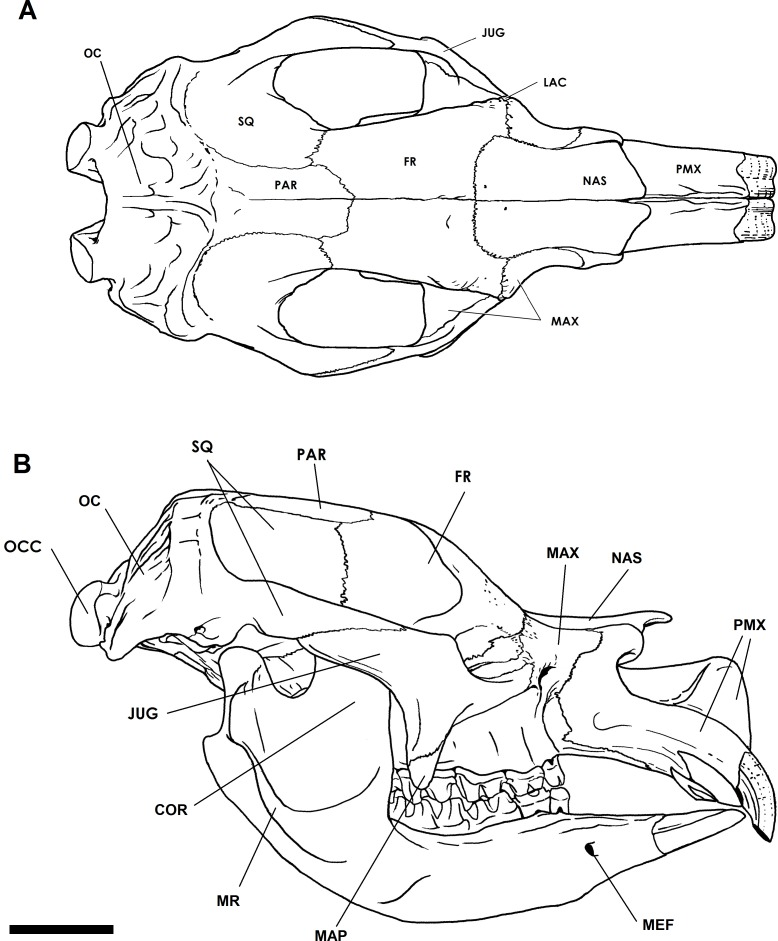
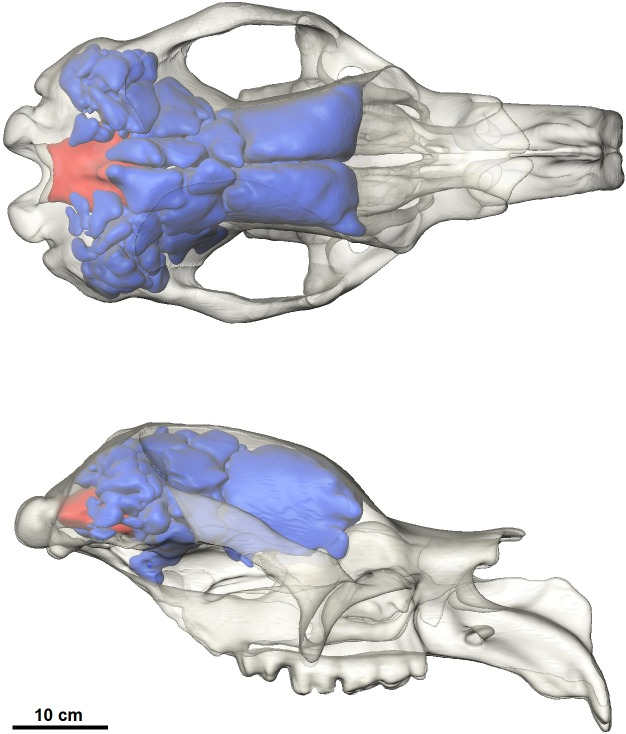
Diprotodon skull reconstructions showing the cranial bones (left) and the frontal sinuses (right)

Diprotodon has a long, narrow skull. Like other marsupials, the top of the skull of Diprotodon is flat or depressed over the small braincase and the sinuses of the frontal bone. Like many other giant vombatiformes, the frontal sinuses are extensive; in a specimen from Bacchus Marsh, they take up 2,675 cc (163.2 cu in)—roughly 25% of skull volume—whereas the brain occupies 477 cc (29.1 cu in)—only 4% of the skull volume. Marsupials tend to have smaller brain-to-body mass ratios than placental mammals. However these become more disparate the bigger the animal, which could be a response to a need to conserve energy, because the brain is a calorically expensive organ. Brain size is also proportional to the maternal metabolic rate, which is much less in marsupials, due to the shorter gestation period. The expanded sinuses increase the surface area available for the temporalis muscle to attach. This is important for biting and chewing, to compensate for a less massive braincase, as a result of a proportionally smaller brain. They may also have helped dissipate stresses produced by biting more efficiently across the skull.

The occipital bone, at the back of the skull, slopes forward at 45 degrees, unlike most modern marsupials, where it is vertical. The base of the occipital is significantly thickened. The occipital condyles, a pair of bones that connect the skull with the vertebral column, are semi-circular and the bottom half is narrower than the top. The inner border, which forms the foramen magnum where the spinal cord feeds through, is thin and well-defined. The top margin of the foramen magnum is somewhat flattened rather than arched. The foramen expands backwards and vertically towards the inlet, and is more-reminiscent of a short neural canal (the tube running through a vertebral centrum where the spinal cord passes through) than a foramen magnum.

A sagittal crest extends across the midline of the skull from the supraoccipital (the top of the occipital bone) to the region between the eyes on the top of the head. The orbit (eye socket) is small and vertically oval-shaped. The nasal bones slightly curve upwards until near their endpoint, where they begin to curve down, giving the bones a somewhat S-shaped profile. Like many marsupials, most of the nasal septum is made of bone rather than cartilage. The nose would have been quite mobile. The height of the skull from the peak of the occipital bone to the end of the nasals is strikingly almost uniform; the end of the nasals is the tallest point. The zygomatic arch (cheek bone) is strong and deep as in kangaroos but unlike those of koalas and wombats, and extends all the way from the supraoccipital.

==== Jaws ====
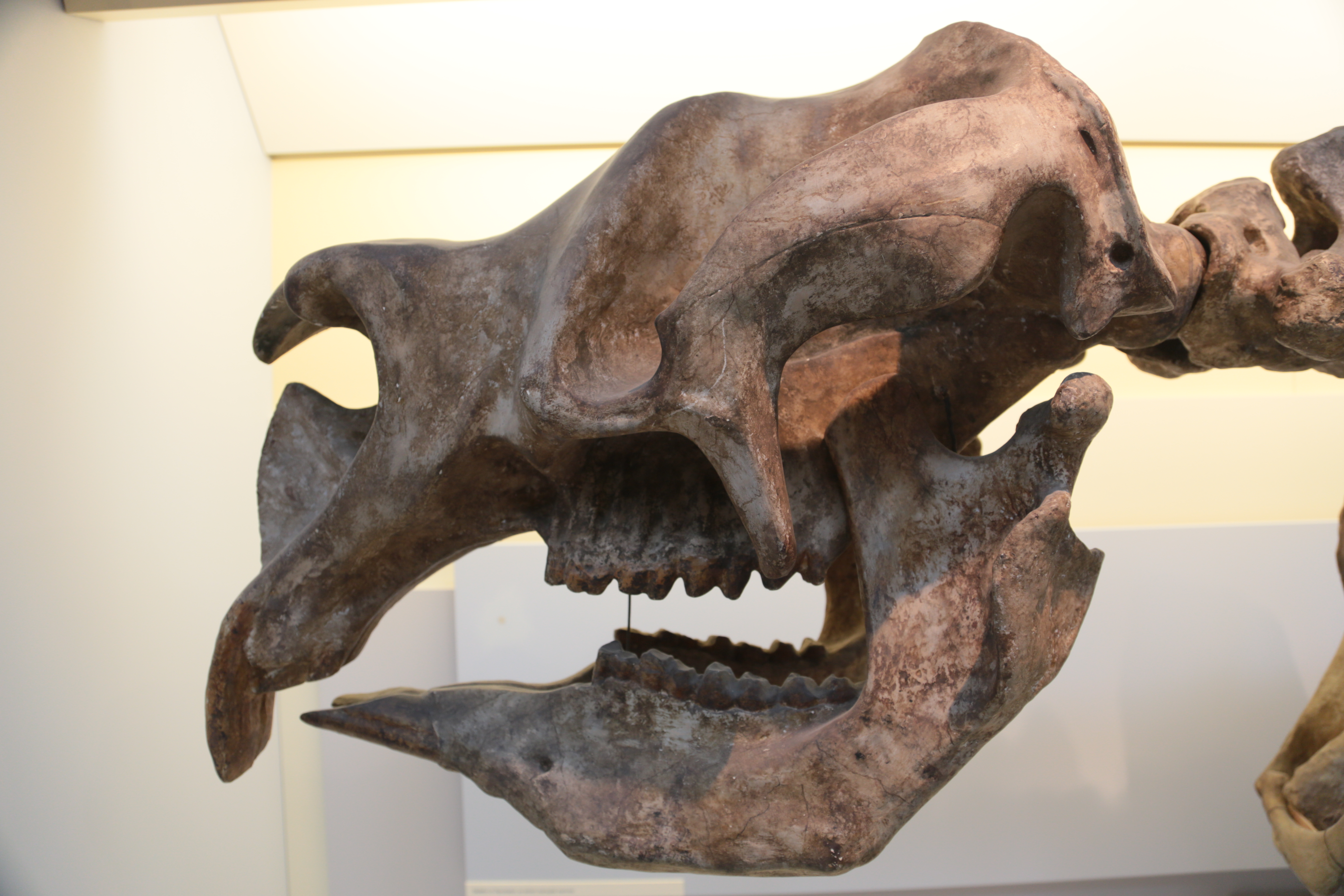
Diprotodon skull at the Natural History Museum, London

As in kangaroos and wombats, there is a gap between the jointing of the palate (roof of the mouth) and the maxilla (upper jaw) behind the last molar, which is filled by the medial pterygoid plate. This would have been the insertion for the medial pterygoid muscle that was involved in closing the jaw. Like many grazers, the masseter muscle, which is also responsible for closing the jaw, seems to have been the dominant jaw muscle. A large temporal muscle compared to the lateral pterygoid muscle may indicate, unlike in wombats, a limited range of side-to-side jaw motion. This means that Diprotodon would have been better at crushing rather than grinding food. The insertion of the masseter is placed forwards, in front of the orbits, which could have allowed better control over the incisors. Diprotodon's chewing strategy appears to align more with kangaroos than wombats: a powerful vertical crunch was followed by a transverse grinding motion.

As in other marsupials, the ramus of the mandible, the portion that goes up to connect with the skull, angles inward. The condyloid process, which connects the jaw to the skull, is similar to that of a koala. The ramus is straight and extends almost vertically, thickening as it approaches the body of the mandible where the teeth are. The depth of the body of the mandible increases from the last molar to the first. The strong mandibular symphysis, which fuses the two halves of the mandible, begins at the front-most end of the third molar; this would prevent either half of the mandible from moving independently of the other, unlike in kangaroos which use this ability to better control their incisors.

==== Teeth ====
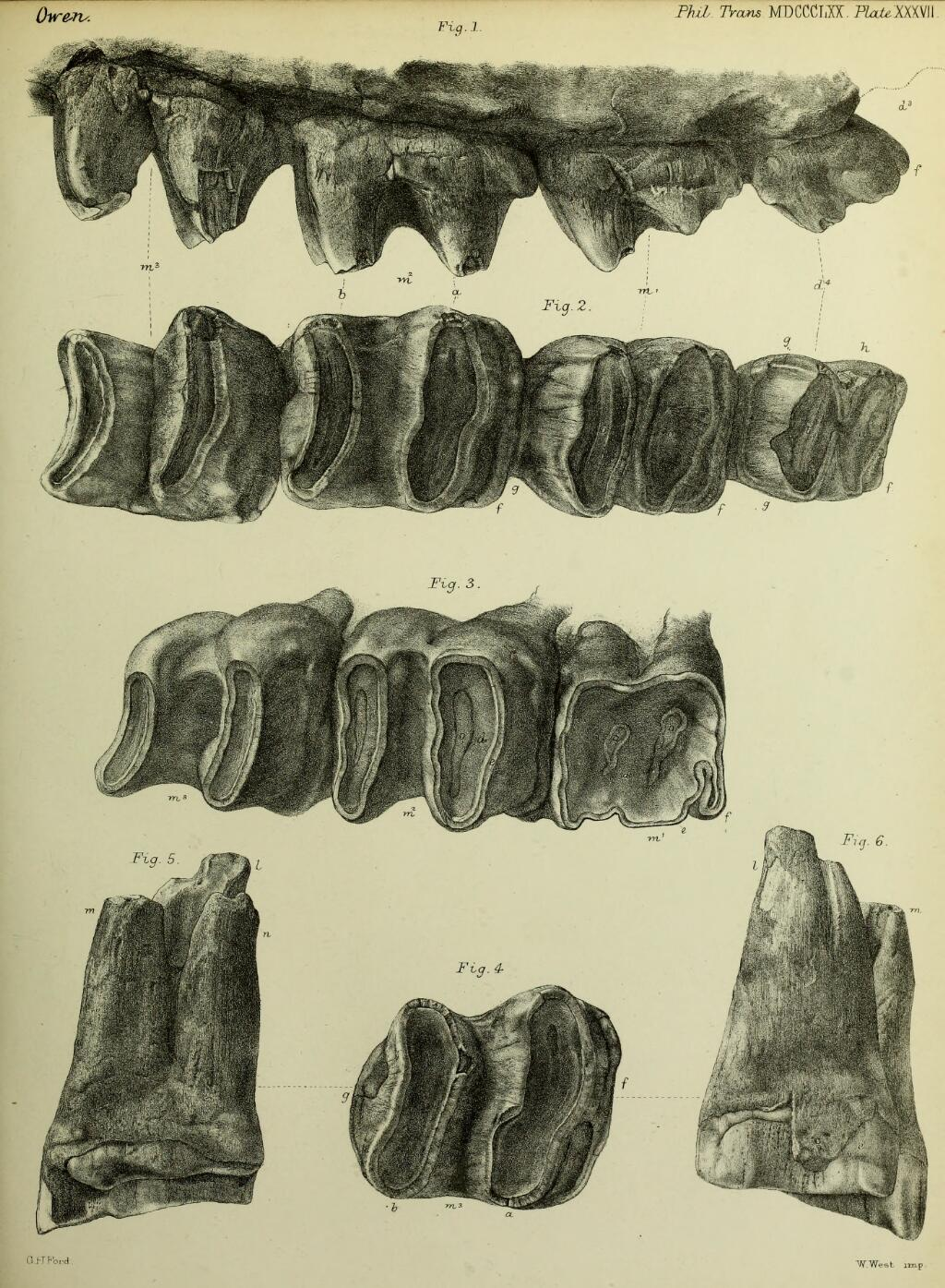
Diprotodon molars

The dental formula of Diprotodon is 3.0.1.41.0.1.4. In each half of either jaw are three incisors in the upper jaw and one in the lower jaw; there are one premolar and four molars in both jaws but no canines. A long diastema (gap) separates the incisors from the molars.

The incisors are scalpriform (chisel-like). Like those of wombats and rodents, the first incisors in both jaws continuously grew throughout the animal's life but the other two upper incisors did not. This combination is not seen in any living marsupial. The cross-section of the upper incisors is circular. In one old male specimen, the first upper incisor measures 280 mm (11 in) of which 220 mm (8.5 in) is within the tooth socket; the second is 100 mm (4 in) and 25 mm (1 in) is in the socket; and the exposed part of the third is 66 mm (2.6 in). The first incisor is convex, and curves outwards, but the other two are concave. The lower incisor has a faint upward curve, but is otherwise straight and has an oval cross-section. In the same old male specimen, the lower incisor measures 250 mm (10 in), of which 2/3 is inside the socket.

The premolars and molars are bilophodont, each having two distinct lophs (ridges). The premolar is triangular and about half the size of the molars. As in kangaroos, the necks of the lophs are coated in cementum. Unlike in kangaroos, there is no connecting ridge between the lophs. The peaks of these lophs have a thick enamel coating that thins towards the base; this could wear away with use and expose the dentine layer, and beneath that osteodentine. Like the first premolar of other marsupials, the first molar of Diprotodon and wombats is the only tooth that is replaced. D. optatum premolars were highly morphologically variable even within the same individual.

=== Vertebrae ===
Diprotodon had seven cervical (neck) vertebrae. The atlas, the first cervical (C1), has a pair of deep cavities for insertion of the occipital condyles (bulges at the back of the skull that articulate with the cervical vertebrae). The diaphophyses (extensions from the side of a vertebra) of the atlas, an upward-angled projection on either the side of the vertebra, are relatively short and thick, and resemble those of wombats and koalas. The articular surface of the axis (C2), the part that joints to another vertebra, is slightly concave on the front side and flat on the back side. As in kangaroos, the axis has a low subtriangular hypophysis (an extension of bone at the bottom of a vertebra; used for muscle attachments) projecting vertically from the underside of the vertebra and a proportionally long odontoid—a projection from the axis which fits into the atlas—but the neural spine, which projects vertically the topside of the vertebra, is more forwards. The remaining cervicals lack a hypophysis. As in kangaroos, C3 and C4 have a shorter and more-compressed neural spine, which is supported by a low ridge along its midline in the front and the back. The neural spine of C5 is narrower but thicker, and is supported by stronger-but-shorter ridges. C7 had a forked shape on top of the neural spine.

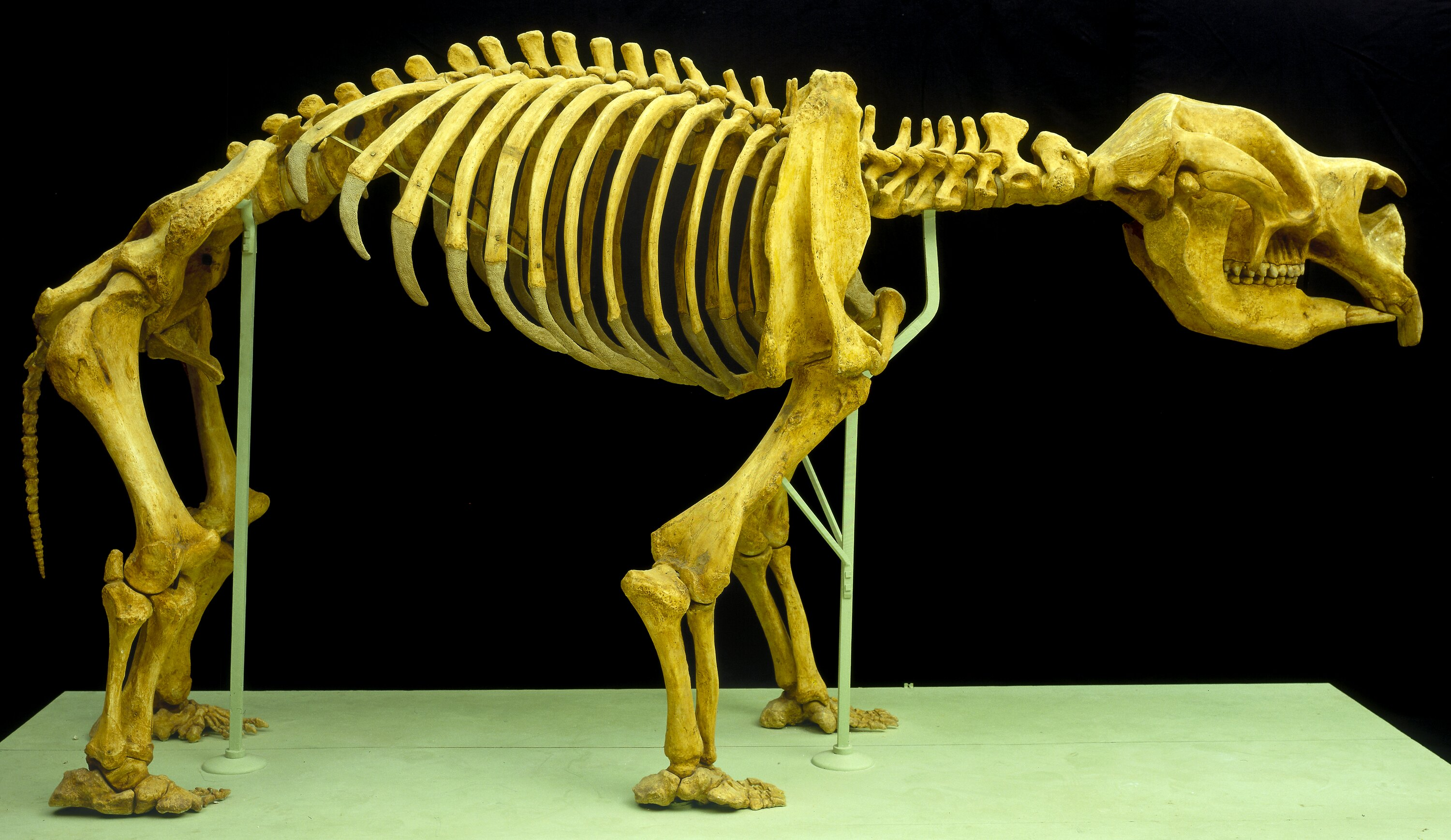
Mounted skeleton, Museums Victoria

Diprotodon probably had 13 dorsal vertebrae and 14 pairs of closely spaced ribs. Like many other mammals, the dorsals initially decrease in breadth and then expand before connecting to the lumbar vertebrae. Unusually, the front dorsals match the short proportions of the cervicals, and the articular surface is flat. At the beginning of the series, the neural spine is broad and angled forward, and is also supported by a low ridge along its midline in the front and the back. In later examples, the neural spine is angled backwards and bifurcates (splits into two). Among mammals, bifurcation (splitting at the top) of the neural spine is only seen in elephants and humans, and only in a few of the cervicals and not in the dorsals. Compared to those of wombats and kangaroos, the neural arch is proportionally taller. As in elephants, the epiphysial plates (growth plates) and the neural arch, to which the neural spine is attached, are anchylosed—very rigid in regard to the vertebral centrum—which served to support the animal's immense weight.

Like most marsupials, Diprotodon likely had six lumbar vertebrae. (Note: Wombats have four lumbar vertebrae and koalas have five.) They retain a proportionally tall neural arch but not the diapophyses, though L1 can retain a small protuberance on one side where a diapophysis would be in a dorsal vertebra; this has been documented in kangaroos and other mammals. The length of each vertebra increases along the series so the lumbar series may have bent downward. Like other marsupials, Diprotodon had two sacral vertebrae. The base of the neural spines of these two were ossified (fused) together.

=== Limbs ===
==== Girdles ====
The general proportions of the scapula (shoulder blade) align more closely with more-basal vertebrates such as monotremes, birds, reptiles, and fish rather than other marsupials and placental mammals. It is triangular and proportionally narrow but unlike most mammals with a triangular scapula, the arm attaches to top of the scapula and the subspinous fossa (the fossa, a depression below the spine of the scapula) becomes bigger towards the arm joint rather than decreasing. The glenoid cavity where the arm connects is oval shaped as in most mammals.

Unlike other marsupials, the ilia, the large wings of the pelvis, are lamelliform (short and broad, with a flat surface instead of an iliac fossa). Lamelliform ilia have only been recorded in elephants, sloths, and apes, though these groups all have a much-longer sacral vertebra series whereas marsupials are restricted to two sacral vertebrae. The ilia provided strong muscle attachments that were probably oriented and used much the same as those in an elephant. The sacroiliac joint where the pelvis connects to the spine is at 35 degrees in reference to the long axis of the ilium. The ischia, which form part of the hip socket, are thick and rounded tailwards but taper and diverge towards the socket, unlike those in kangaroos, where the ischia proceed almost parallel to each other. They were not connected to the vertebra. The hip socket itself is well-rounded and almost hemispherical.

==== Long bones ====
Unlike those of most marsupials, the humerus of Diprotodon is almost straight rather than S-shaped, and the trochlea of the humerus at the elbow joint is not perforated. The ridges for muscle attachments are poorly developed, which seems to have been compensated for by the powerful forearms. Similarly, the condyles where the radius and ulna (the forearm bones) connect maintain their rounded shape and are quite-similarly sized, and unusually reminiscent of the condyles between the femur and the tibia and fibula in the leg of a kangaroo.

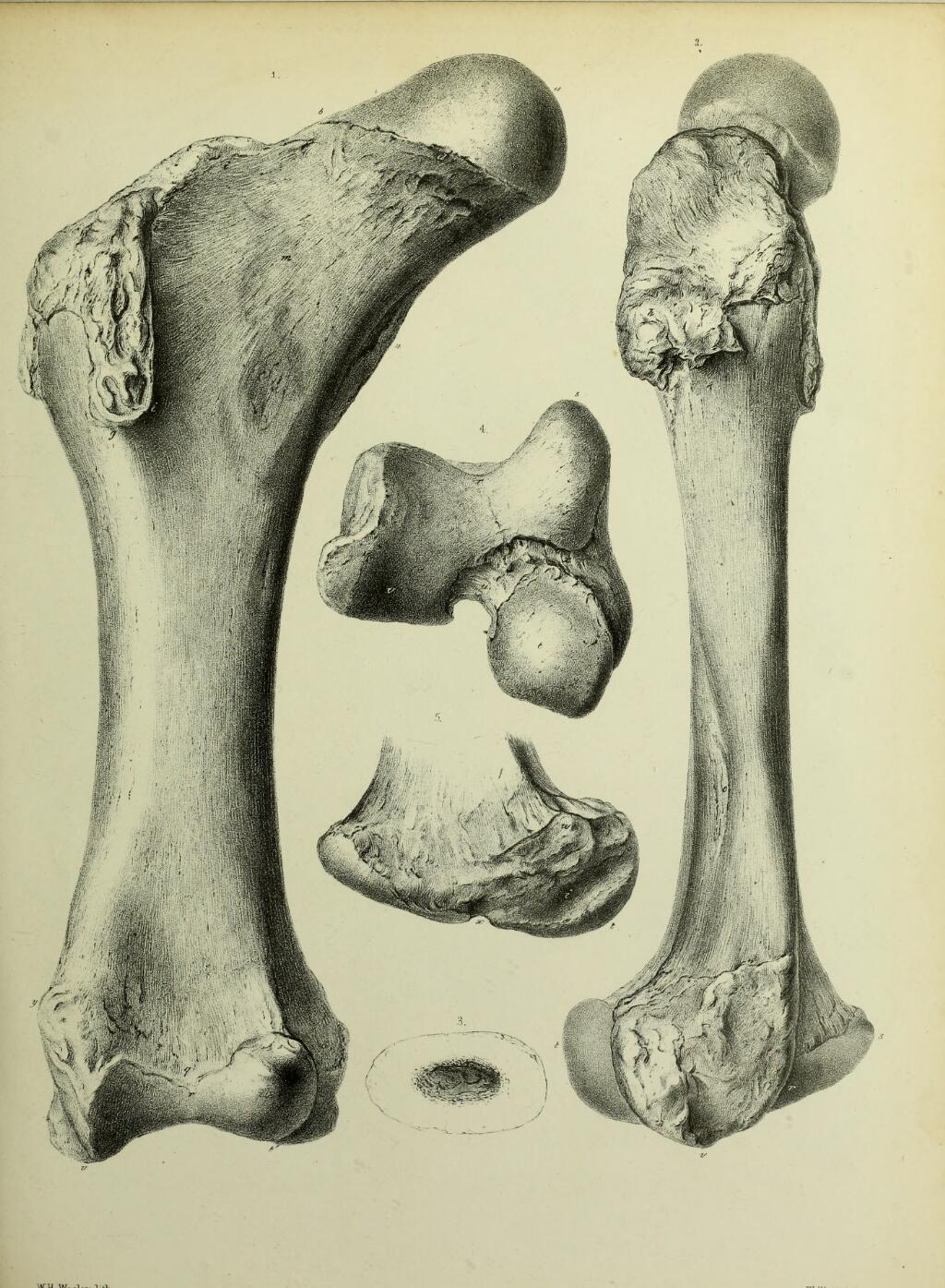
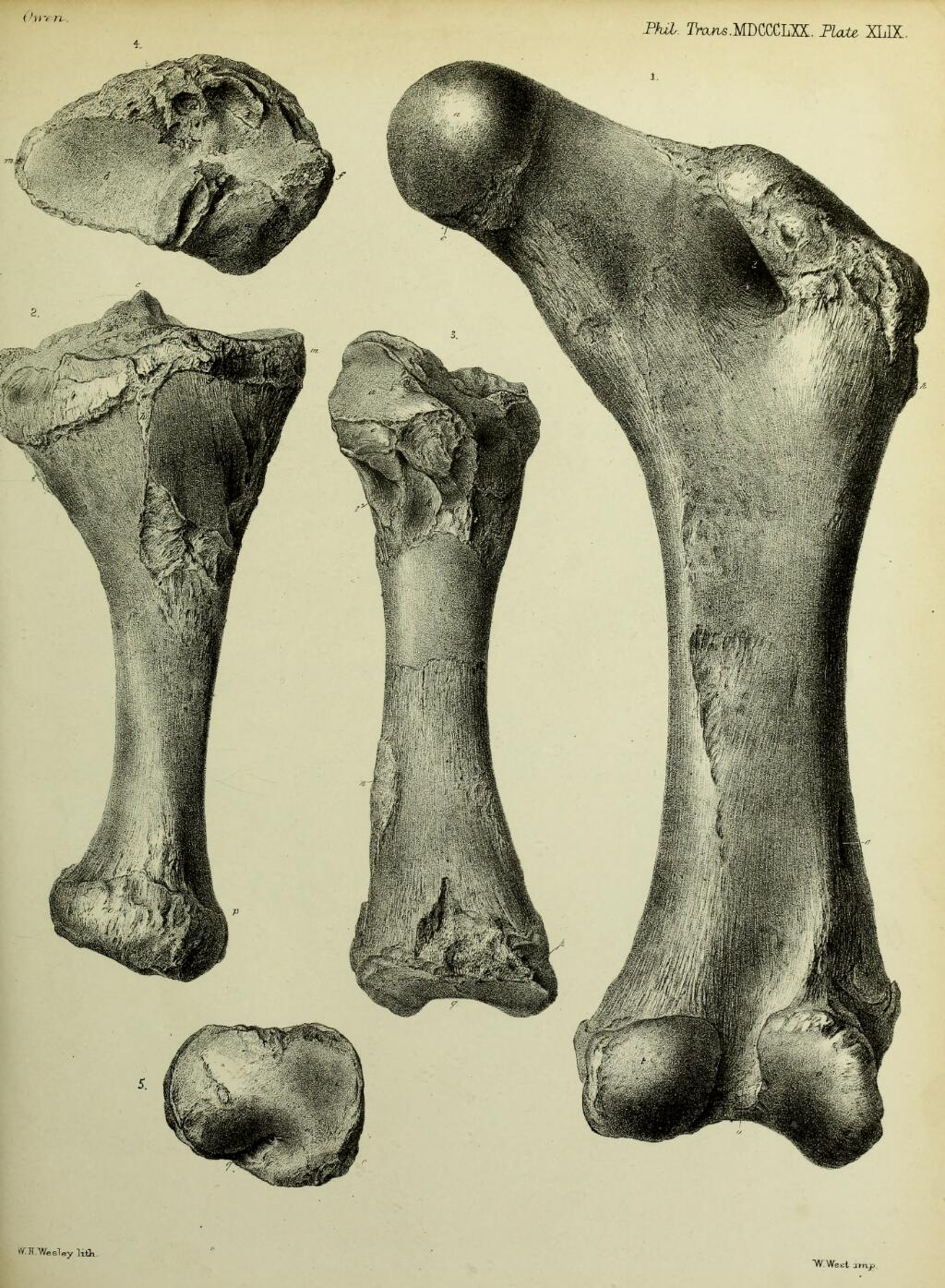
Different views of a Diprotodon femur

Like elephants, the femur of Diprotodon is straight and compressed anteroposteriorly (from headside to tailside). The walls of the femur are prodigiously thickened, strongly constricting the medullary cavity where the bone marrow is located. The proximal end (part closest to the hip joint) is notably long, broad, and deep. The femoral head projects up far from the greater trochanter. As in kangaroos, the greater trochanter is split into two lobes. The femoral neck is roughly the same diameter as the femoral head. Also as in kangaroos, the condyle for the fibula is excavated out but the condyle for the tibia is well-rounded and hemispherical. Like those of many other marsupials, the tibia is twisted and the tibial malleolus (on the ankle) is reduced.

==== Paws ====
Diprotodon has five digits on either paw. Like other plantigrade walkers, where the paws were flat on the ground, the wrist and ankle would have been largely rigid and inflexible. The digits are proportionally weak so the paws probably had a lot of padding. Similarly, the digits do not seem to have been much engaged in weight bearing.

The forepaw was strong and the shape of the wrist bones is quite similar to those of kangaroos. Like other vombatiformes, the metacarpals, which connect the fingers to the wrist, are broadly similar to those of kangaroos and allies. The enlarged pisiform bone takes up half the jointing surface of the ulna. The fifth digit on the forepaw is the largest.

The digits of the hindpaws turn inwards from the ankle at 130 degrees. The second and third metatarsals (the metatarsals connect the toes to the ankle) are significantly reduced, which may mean these digits were syndactylous (fused) like those of all modern diprotodontians. The first, fourth, and fifth digits are enlarged. The toes are each about the same length, except the fifth which is much stouter.

=== Size ===
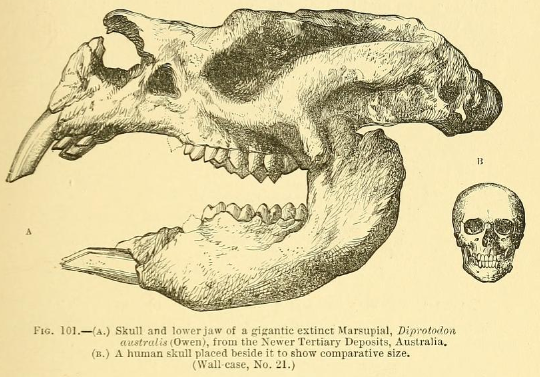
1896 illustration of a Diprotodon and human skull

Diprotodon is the largest-known marsupial to ever have lived. In life, adult Diprotodon could have reached 160–180 cm (5 ft 3 in – 5 ft 11 in) at the shoulders and 275–340 cm (9–11 ft) from head to tail. Accounting for cartilaginous intervertebral discs, Diprotodon may have been 20% longer than reconstructed skeletons, exceeding 400 cm (13 ft 1 in).

As researchers were formulating predictive body-mass equations for fossil species, efforts were largely constrained to eutherian mammals rather than marsupials. The first person to attempt to estimate the living weight of Diprotodon was Peter Murray in his 1991 review of the megafauna of Pleistocene Australia; Murray made an estimate of 1,150 kg (2,540 lb) using cranial and dental measurements, which he said was probably not a very precise figure. This made Diprotodon the largest herbivore in Australia. In 2001, Canadian biologist Gary Burness and colleagues did a linear regression between the largest herbivores and carnivores—living or extinct—from every continent (for Australia: Diprotodon, Varanus priscus, and Thylacoleo carnifex) against the landmass area of their continent, and another regression between the daily food intake of living creatures against the landmass of their continents. He calculated the food requirement of Diprotodon was 50–60% smaller than expected for Australia's landmass, which he believed was a result of a generally lower metabolism in marsupials compared to placentals—up to 20% lower—and sparser nutritious vegetation than other continents. The maximum attainable body size is capped much lower than those for other continents.

In 2003, Australian palaeontologist Stephen Wroe and colleagues took a more sophisticated approach to body mass than Murray's estimate. They made a regression between the minimum circumference of the femora and humeri of 18 quadrupedal marsupials and 32 placentals against body mass, and then inputted 17 Diprotodon long bones into their predictive model. The results ranged from 2,272–3,417 kg (5,009–7,533 lb), for a mean of 2,786 kg (6,142 lb), though Wroe said reconstructing the weight of extinct creatures that far outweighed living counterparts (Note: A bull red kangaroo, the largest living marsupial, can weigh up to 22–85 kg (49–187 lb).) is problematic. For comparison, an American bison they used in their study weighed 1,179 kg (2,599 lb) and a hippo weighed 1,950 kg (4,300 lb).

== Paleobiology ==
=== Diet ===
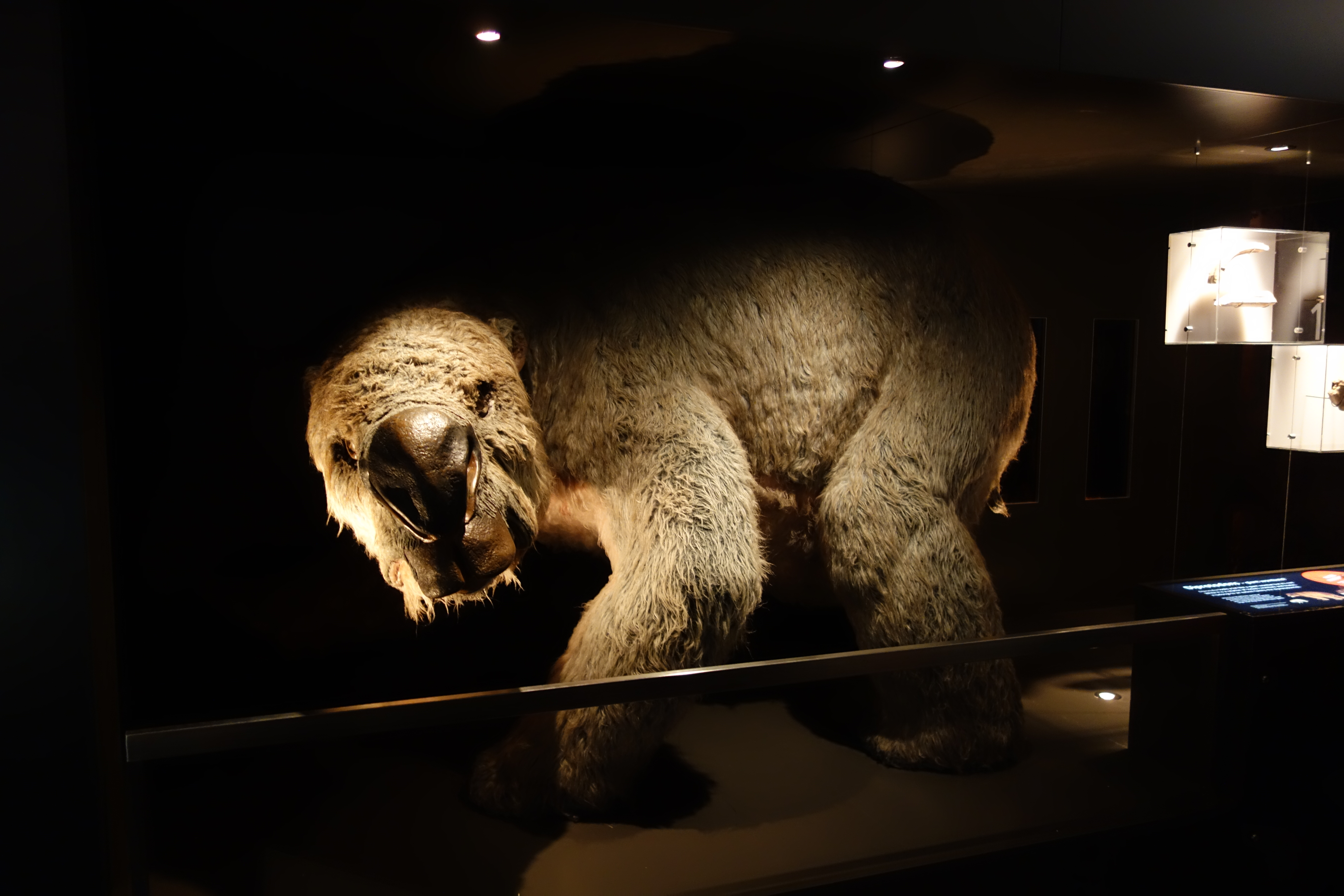
Diprotodon sculpture at the Australian Museum

Like modern megaherbivores, most evidently the African elephant, Pleistocene Australian megafauna likely had a profound effect on the vegetation, limiting the spread of forest cover and woody plants. Carbon isotope analysis suggests Diprotodon fed on a broad range of foods and, like kangaroos, was consuming both C_{3}—well-watered trees, shrubs, and grasses—and C_{4} plants—arid grasses, a finding replicated by calcium isotope analysis showing Diprotodon to have been a mixed feeder. Carbon isotope analyses on Diprotodon excavated from the Cuddie Springs site in units SU6 (possibly 45,000 years old) and SU9 (350,000 to 570,000 years old) indicate Diprotodon adopted a somewhat-more-varied seasonal diet as Australia's climate dried but any change was subtle. In contrast, contemporary kangaroos and wombats underwent major dietary shifts or specialisations towards, respectively, C_{3} and C_{4} plants. The fossilised, incompletely digested gut contents of one 53,000-year-old individual from Lake Callabonna show its last meal consisted of young leaves, stalks, and twigs.

The molars of Diprotodon are a simple bilophodont shape. Kangaroos use their bilophodont teeth to grind tender, low-fibre plants as a browser as well as grass as a grazer. Kangaroos that predominantly graze have specialised molars to resist the abrasiveness of grass but such adaptations are not exhibited in Diprotodon, which may have had a mixed diet similar to that of a browsing wallaby. It may also have chewed like wallabies, beginning with a vertical crunch before grinding transversely, as opposed to wombats, which only grind transversely. Similarly to many large ungulates (hoofed mammals), the jaws of Diprotodon were better suited for crushing rather than grinding, which would have permitted it to process vegetation in bulk. It is unclear whether they excreted cube-shaped droppings, similar to an extant modern-day wombat.

In 2016, Australian biologists Alana Sharpe and Thomas Rich estimated the maximum-possible bite force of Diprotodon using finite element analysis. They calculated 2,374 N (534 lb_{f}) at the incisors and 4,118 to 11,134 N (926 to 2,503 lb_{f}) across the molar series. For reference, the American alligator can produce forces upwards of 9,500 N (2,100 lb_{f}). Though these are likely overestimates, (Note: Finite element analysis considers the skull's section modulus—an object's ability to resist bending—but the material properties of marsupial skulls are not well studied. Sharpe and Rich used what they considered a typical Young's modulus and Poisson's ratio for a mammalian skull—respectively 20 GPa (2,900,000 psi) and 0.3—and unsafely assumed these properties were uniform across the entire skull. This likely would have made their model skull stiffer than the real thing.) the jaws of Diprotodon were exceptionally strong, which would have allowed it to consume a broad range of plants, including tough, fibrous grasses.

=== Migration and sociality ===
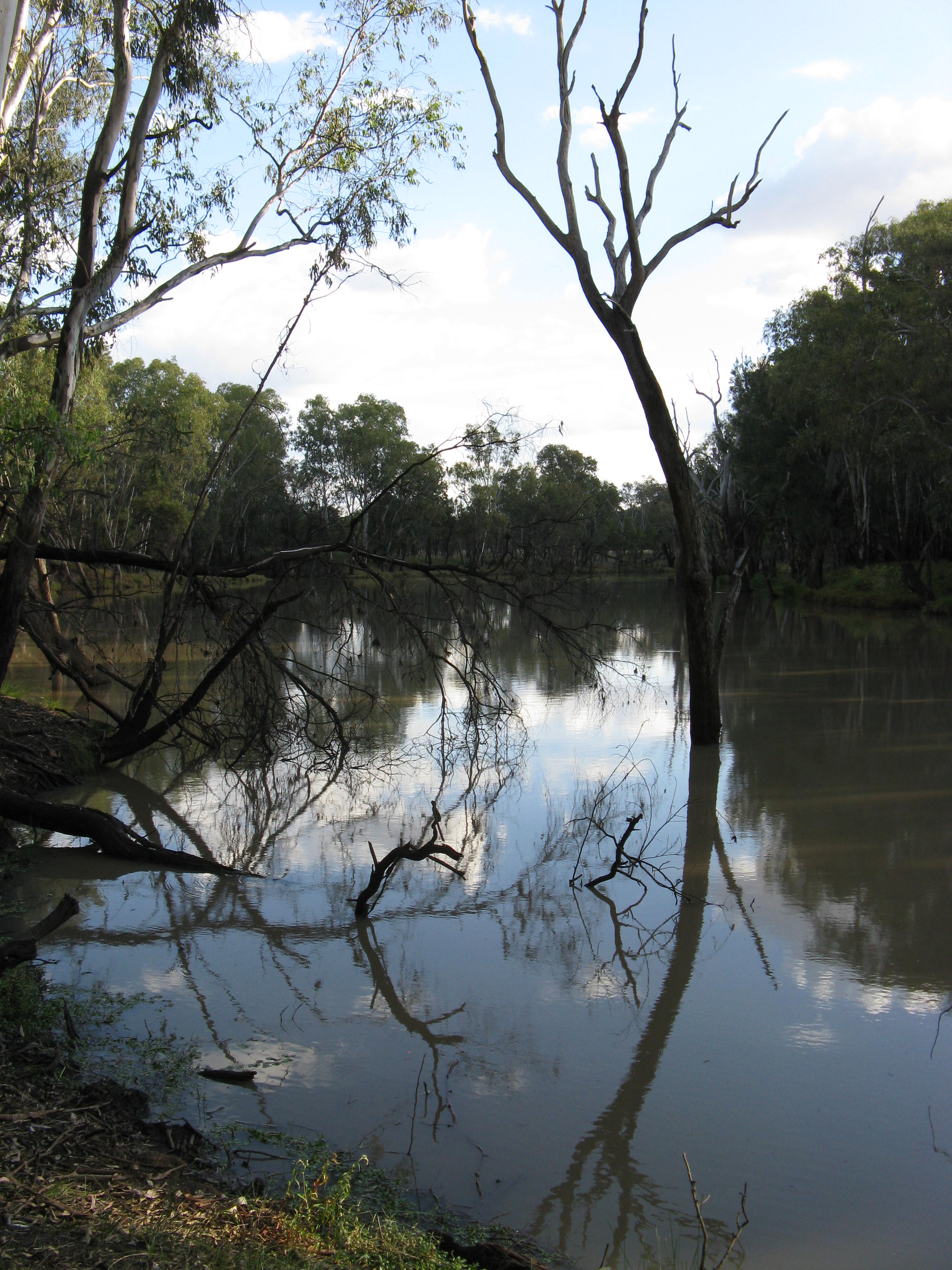
One Diprotodon herd was making seasonal migrations along the Condamine River (above).

In 2017, by measuring the strontium isotope ratio (^{87}Sr/^{86}Sr) at various points along the Diprotodon incisor QMF3452 from the Darling Downs, and matching those ratios to the ratios of sites across that region, Price and colleagues determined Diprotodon made seasonal migrations, probably in search of food or watering holes. This individual appears to have been following the Condamine River and, while apparently keeping to the Darling Downs during the three years this tooth had been growing, it would have been annually making a 200 km (120 mi) northwest-southeast round trip. This trek parallels the mammalian mass migrations of modern-day East Africa.

Diprotodon is the only identified metatherian (Note: Metatheria includes marsupials and all therian mammals more closely related to marsupials than placentals.) that seasonally migrated between two places. A few modern marsupials, such as the red kangaroo, have been documented making migrations when necessary but it is not a seasonal occurrence. Because Diprotodon could do it, it is likely other Pleistocene Australian megafauna also had seasonal migrations.

Diprotodon apparently moved in large herds. Possible fossilised herds, which are most-commonly unearthed in south-eastern Australia, seem to be mostly or entirely female, and sometimes travelled with juveniles. Such sexual segregation is normally seen in polygynous species; it is a common social organisation among modern megaherbivores involving an entirely female herd save for their young and the dominant male, with which the herd exclusively breeds. Similarly, the skull is adapted to handling much-higher stresses than that which resulted from bite alone so Diprotodon may have subjected its teeth or jaws to more-strenuous activities than chewing, such as fighting other Diprotodon for mates or fending off predators, using the incisors. Like modern red and grey kangaroos, which also sexually segregate, bachelor herds of Diprotodon seem to have been less tolerant to drought conditions than female herds due to their larger size and nutritional requirements.

=== Gait ===
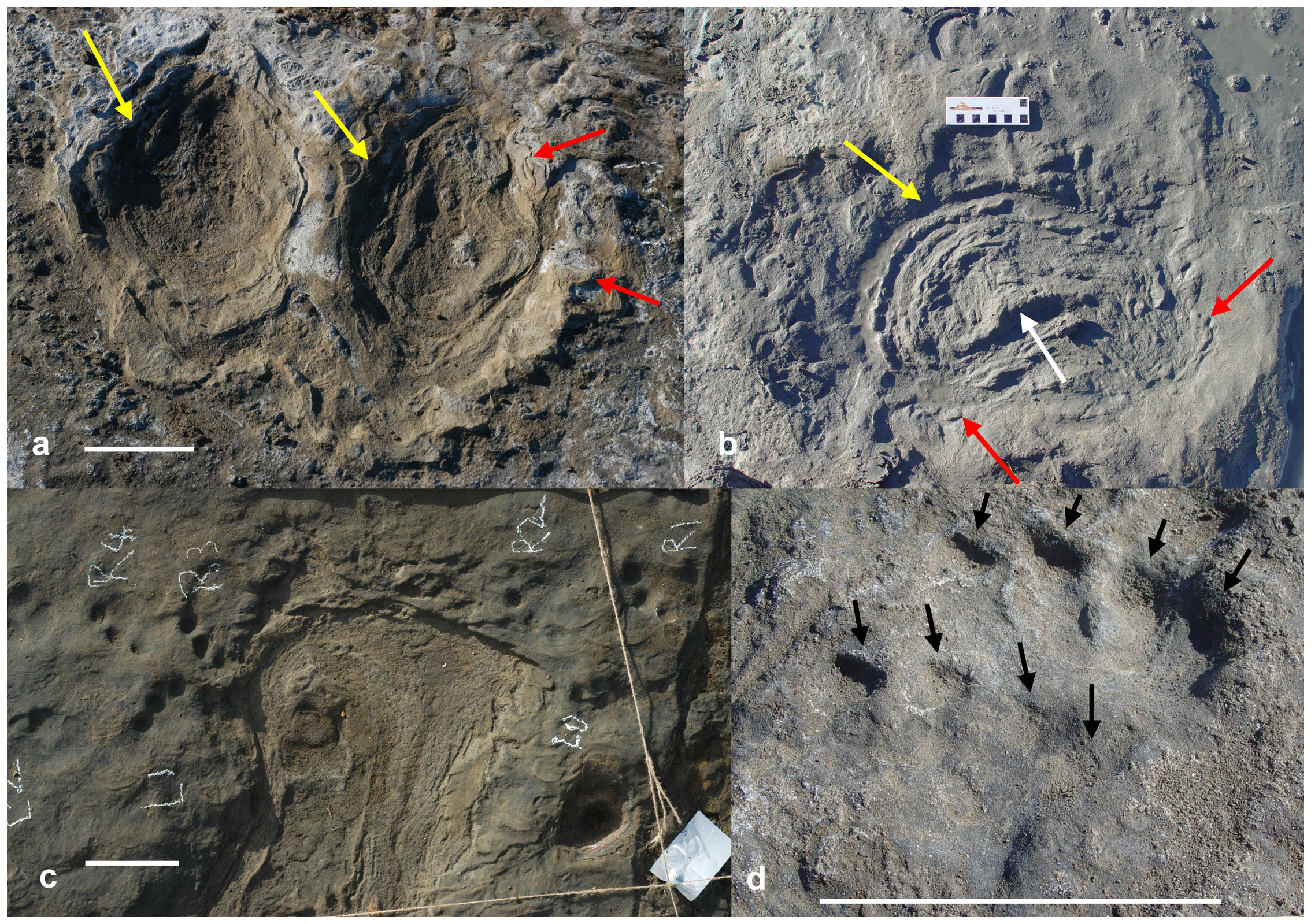
Fossil tracks from the Victorian Volcanic Plain site: a) Protemnodon, b) Diprotodon pes, c) Diprotodon overlain by a vombatid, d) Thylacoleo

The locomotion of an extinct animal can be inferred using fossil trackways, which seldom preserve in Australia over the Cenozoic. Only the trackways of humans, kangaroos, vombatids, Diprotodon, and the diprotodontid Euowenia have been identified. Diprotodon trackways have been found at Lake Callabonna and the Victorian Volcanic Plain grasslands. The diprotodontid manus (forepaw) print is semi-circular and the pes (hindpaw) is reniform (kidney-shaped). Owing to proportionally small digits, most of the weight was borne on the carpus and tarsus—the bones connecting to respectively the wrist and the ankle. Diprotodontines seem to have had a much-more-erect gait, an adaptation to long-distance travel that is similar to that of elephants, rather than the more-sprawling posture of wombats and zygomaturines, though there are no fossil trackways of the latter to verify their reconstructed standing posture.

At Lake Callabonna, the single Diprotodon responsible for the impressions had an average stride length of 1,500 mm (4 ft 11 in), trackway width of 430 mm (1 ft 5 in), and track dimensions 295 mm × 202 mm (11.6 in × 8.0 in) in length x width. The gleno-acetabular length—the distance between the shoulders and pelvis—could have been about 1,125 mm (3 ft 8 in); assuming a hip height of 900 mm (2 ft 11 in), the maker of these tracks was probably moving at around 6.3 km/h (3.9 mph).

The single Diprotodon responsible for the impressions at the volcanic plain had an average stride length of 1,310 mm (4 ft 4 in), trackway width of 660 mm (2 ft 2 in), and pes length of 450 mm (1 ft 6 in). The gleno-acetabular length may have been about 1,080 mm (3 ft 7 in) and assuming a hip height of 830 mm (2 ft 9 in), the maker of the tracks was probably moving at around 5.5 km/h (3.4 mph). Its posture was much-more-sprawled than the example from Callabonna, aligning more with what might be expected of Zygomaturus. The animal may have been a female carrying a large joey in her pouch, the added weight on the stomach altering the gait. The first trackway continues for 62.8 m (206 ft) in a south-easterly direction towards a palaeo-lake. The animal seems to have hesitated while stepping down from the first sand bar on its path with the right pes making three overlapping prints here while shuffling around. The trackway vanishes for a 20 m (66 ft) stretch and reappears while the animal seemingly is stepping on wet sediment. Another diprotodontid trackway appears 50 m (160 ft) away, moving southerly, which may have been left by the same individual.

=== Life history ===
The marsupial metabolic rate is about 30% lower than that of placentals due to a lower body temperature of 34 to 36 °C (93 to 97 °F). Marsupials give birth at an earlier point in foetal development, relying on lactation to facilitate most of the joey's development; because pregnancy is much-more-energetically expensive, investing in lactation rather than longer gestation can be advantageous in a highly seasonal and unpredictable climate to minimise maternal nutritional requirements. Consequently, marsupials cannot support as large a litter size or as short a generation time.

Based on the relationship between female body size and life history in kangaroos, a 1,000 kg (2,200 lb) Diprotodon female would have gestated for six-to-eight weeks, and given birth to a single 5 g (0.18 oz) joey. Given its massive size, Diprotodon may not have sat down to give birth as do smaller marsupials, possibly standing instead. Like koalas and wombats, the pouch may have faced backwards so the joey could crawl down across its mother's abdomen to enter and attach itself to a teat until it could see—perhaps 260 days—and thermoregulate. It would have permanently left the pouch after 860 days and suckled until reaching 270 kg (600 lb) after four or five years.

In large kangaroos, females usually reach sexual maturity and enter oestrus soon after weaning, and males need double the time to reach sexual maturity. A similar pattern could have been exhibited in Diprotodon. Assuming a lifespan of up to 50 years, a female Diprotodon could have given birth eight times.

== Palaeoecology ==
Diprotodon was present across the entire Australian continent by the Late Pleistocene, especially following MIS5 approximately 110,000 years ago. The onset of the Quaternary glaciation, with the continuous advance and retreat of glaciers at the poles, created extreme climatic variability elsewhere. In Australia, the warmer, wetter interglacial periods were received by forests and woodlands; colder, dryer glacial periods were more conducive to grasslands and deserts. The continent progressively became dryer as the Asian monsoons became less influential over Australia: the vast interior had become arid and sandy by 500,000 years ago; the mega-lakes that were once prominent, especially during interglacials in north-western Australia, dried up; and the rainforests of eastern Australia gradually retreated. Aridity has hastened over the last 100,000 years, especially after 60,000 years ago with surging El Niño–Southern Oscillations.

The continent-wide distribution of Diprotodon indicates herds trekked across almost any habitat, much like modern African elephants south of the Sahara. Diprotodon was a member of a diverse assemblage of megafauna that were endemic to Pleistocene Australia; these also included the thylacine, modern kangaroos, sthenurines (giant short-faced kangaroos), a diversity of modern and giant koala and wombat species, the tapir-like Palorchestes, the giant turtle Meiolania, and the giant bird Genyornis. Diprotodon coexisted with the diprotodontid Zygomaturus trilobus, which appears to have remained in the forests, whereas Diprotodon foraged the expanding grasslands and woodlands. Other contemporaneous diprotodontids (Hulitherium, Z. nimborensia, and Maokopia) were insular forms that were restricted to the forests of New Guinea.

=== Predation ===
Due to its massive size, Diprotodon would have been a tough adversary for native carnivores. It contended with the largest-known marsupial predator Thylacoleo carnifex; while Diprotodon remains that were gnawed or bitten by T. carnifex have been identified, it is unclear if the 100–130 kg (220–290 lb) marsupial predator was powerful enough to kill an animal surpassing 2,000 kg (4,400 lb). The modern jaguar, at half the size of T. carnifex, can kill a 500 kg (1,100 lb) bull so it is possible T. carnifex could have killed small Diprotodon. Similar to recent kangaroos with thylacines or quolls, juvenile Diprotodon may have been at high risk of predation by T. carnifex; it and fossils of juvenile Diprotodon have been recovered from the same caves.

The largest predators of Australia were reptiles, most notably the saltwater crocodile, the now-extinct crocodiles Paludirex and Quinkana, and the giant lizard megalania (Varanus priscus). At 7 m (23 ft) in length, megalania was the largest carnivore of Pleistocene Australia.

=== Extinction ===
As part of the Quaternary extinction event, Diprotodon and every other Australian land animal heavier than 100 kg (220 lb) became extinct. The timing and the exact cause are unclear because there is poor resolution on the ages of Australian fossil sites. Since their discovery, the extinction of the Australian megafauna has usually been blamed on the changing climate or overhunting by the first Aboriginal Australians. In 2001, Australian palaeontologist Richard Roberts and colleagues dated 28 major fossil sites across the continent, and were able to provide a precise date for megafaunal extinction. They found most disappear from the fossil record by 80,000 years ago, but Diprotodon; the giant wombat Phascolonus; Thylacoleo; and the short-faced kangaroos Procoptodon, Protemnodon, and Simosthenurus were identified at Ned's Gully, Queensland, and Kudjal Yolgah Cave, Western Australia, which they dated to respectively 47,000 and 46,000 years ago. Thus, all of the Australian Pleistocene megafauna died out probably between about 50,000 and 41,000 years ago. There also seems to have been a diverse assemblage of megafauna just before their extinction, and all populations across at least western and eastern Australia died out at about the same time. As of 2021, there is still no solid evidence of megafauna surviving past approximately 40,000 years ago; their latest occurrence, including Diprotodon, is recorded at South Walker Creek mine in the north-east at about 40,100 ± 1,700 years ago.

At the time Roberts et al. published their paper, the earliest evidence of human activity in Australia was 56±4 thousand years old, which is close to their calculated date for the megafauna extinction; they hypothesised human hunting had eradicated the last megafauna within about 10,000 years of coexistence. Human hunting had earlier been blamed for the extinction of North American and New Zealand megafauna. Human activity was then generally regarded as the main driver of Australian megafaunal extinction, especially because the megafauna had survived multiple extreme drought periods during glacial periods. At the time, there did not seem to be any evidence of unusually extreme climate during this period. Due to the slowness of marsupial reproduction, even limited megafaunal hunting may have severely weakened the population.

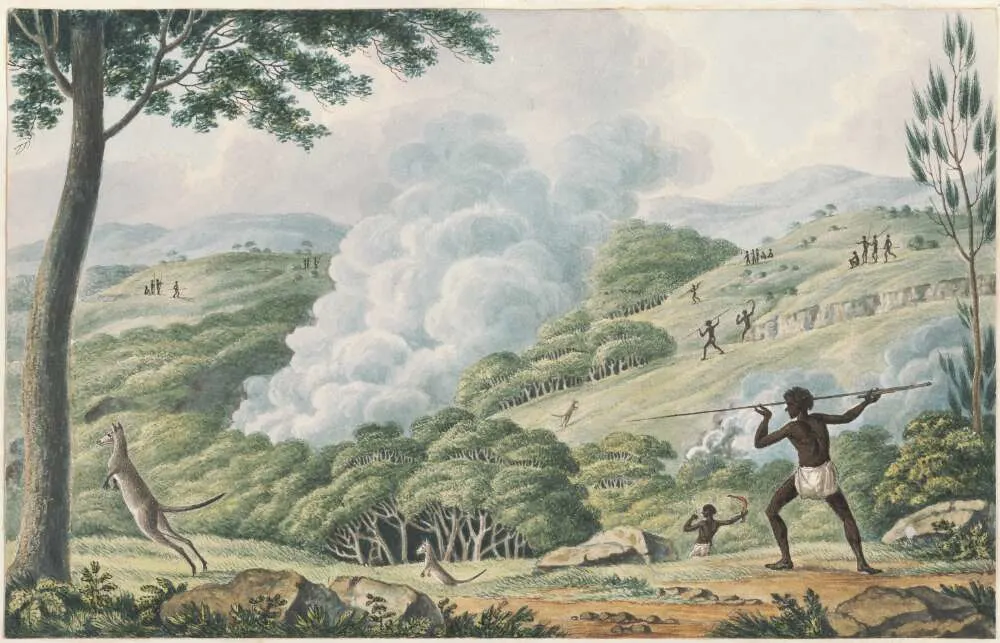
The Aboriginal Australian practice of fire-stick farming (above depicts a kangaroo hunt) may be implicated in megafaunal extinction.

In 2005, American geologist Gifford Miller noticed fire abruptly becomes more common about 45,000 years ago; he ascribed this increase to aboriginal fire-stick farmers, who would have regularly started controlled burns to clear highly productive forests and grasslands. Miller said this radically altered the vegetational landscape and promulgated the expanse of the modern-day fire-resilient scrub at the expense of the megafauna. Subsequent studies had difficulty firmly linking controlled burns with major ecological collapse. The frequency of fire could have also increased as a consequence of megafaunal extinction because total plant consumption rapidly fell, leading to faster fuel buildup.

In 2017, the human-occupied Madjedbebe rock shelter on the northern Australian coast was dated to about 65,000 years ago, which if correct would mean humans and megafauna had coexisted for over 20,000 years. Other authors have considered this dating questionable. In the 2010s, several ecological studies were published in support of major drought conditions coinciding with the final megafaunal extinctions. Their demise may have been the result of a combination of climatic change, human hunting, and human-driven landscape changes.

== Cultural significance ==
=== Fossil evidence ===
Despite the role the first Aboriginal Australians are speculated to have had in the extinction of Diprotodon and other mammalian megafauna in Australia, there is little evidence humans used them at all in the 20,000 years of coexistence. No fossils of mammalian megafauna suggestive of human butchery or cooking have been found. (Note: The only potential direct evidence of human and mammalian megafauna interaction (that has not yet been revised) is a tibial fragment with a single notch belonging to either Sthenurus or Protemnodon (short faced kangaroos), identified in 1980 by Australian zoologist Michael Archer and colleagues in Mammoth Cave, Western Australia.)

In 1984, Gail Paton discovered an upper-right Diprotodon incisor (^{2}I) bearing 28 visible cut marks in Spring Creek, south-western Victoria; Ron Vanderwald and Richard Fullager studied the incisor, which was split in half longitudinally, seemingly while the bone was still fresh but it was glued together before Vanderwald and Fullager could inspect it. Each piece measures 40 cm (16 in) in length. The marks are aligned in a straight line, and measure 0.91–4.1 mm (0.036–0.161 in) in length, 0.14–0.8 mm (0.0055–0.0315 in) in width, and 0.02–0.24 mm (0.00079–0.00945 in) in depth. They determined it was inconsistent with bite marks from scavenging Thylacoleo or mice, and concluded it was incised by humans with flint as a counting system or a random doodle. This specimen became one of the most-cited pieces of evidence humans and megafauna directly interacted until a 2020 re-analysis by Australian palaeoanthropologist Michelle Langley identified the engraver as most-likely a tiger quoll.

In 2016, Australian archaeologist Giles Hamm and colleagues unearthed a partial right radius belonging to a young Diprotodon in the Warratyi rock shelter. Because it lacks carnivore damage and the rock shelter is up a sheer face Diprotodon is unlikely to have climbed, they said humans were responsible for taking the Diprotodon to the site.

=== Mythology ===
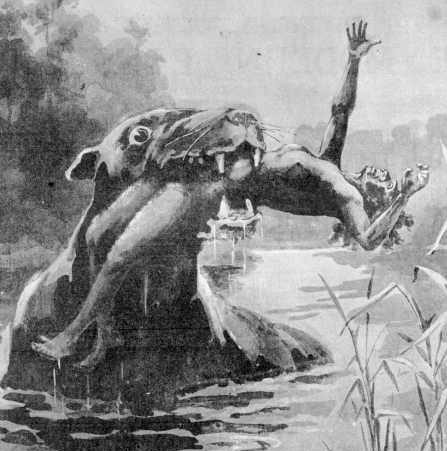
Diprotodon, soon after discovery, was associated with the bunyip (above drawn by J. Mcfarlane, 1890).

When the first massive fossils in Australia were dug up, it was not clear what animals they might have represented because there were no serious scientists on the continent. Local residents guessed some may have been the remains of rhinos or elephants. European settlers, the most-vocal of whom was Reverend John Dunmore Lang, forwarded these fossils as evidence of the Genesis flood narrative. Aboriginal Australians also attempted to fit the finds into their own religious ideas, quickly associating Diprotodon with the bunyip—a large, carnivorous lake monster. Many ethnologists and palaeontologists of the time believed the bunyip was a tribal memory of the lumbering giant creature that probably frequented marshlands, though at the time it was uncertain if Diprotodon and other megafauna were indeed extinct because the Australian continent had not yet been fully explored by Europeans. Scientific investigation into the bunyip was stigmatised after a purported bunyip skull was sensationalised in 1846, and was put on display at the Australian Museum. The following year, however, Owen recognised it as the skull of a foal, and was surprised the burgeoning Australian scientific community could have erred so egregiously.

In 1892, Canadian geologist Henry Yorke Lyell Brown reported that Aboriginal Australians identified Diprotodon fossils from Lake Eyre as those of the Rainbow Serpent, which he thought was a giant, bottom-dwelling fish. This notion became somewhat popularised after English geologist John Walter Gregory, who believed the god was a horned, scaly creature, conjectured it was a chimaera of Diprotodon—which he believed had a horn—and a crocodile. Later workers continued to report some link between the Rainbow Serpent and either Diprotodon or crocodiles.

These kinds of suppositions are not testable and require stories to survive in oral tradition for tens of thousands of years. If Pleistocene megafauna are the basis of some aboriginal mythology, it is unclear if the stories were based on the creatures when they were alive or their fossils being discovered long after their extinction.

=== Rock art representations ===
Aboriginal Australians decorated caves with paintings and drawings of several creatures, but the identities of the subjects are often unclear. In 1907, Australian anthropologist Herbert Basedow found footprint petroglyphs in Yunta Springs and Wilkindinna, South Australia, which he believed were those of Diprotodon. In 1988, Australian historian Percy Trezise presented what he thought was a Quinkan depiction of Diprotodon to the First Congress of the Australian Rock Art Research Association. Both of these claims have their faults because the depictions bear several features that are inconsistent with what is known about Diprotodon. Unlike the realism of most Cro-Magnon artworks, which are more easily identifiable as various animals, the subjects of Australian Aboriginal paintings can be mythological beings from the Dreaming rather than a corporeal subject, making the artwork much more stylistic and mostly uninterpretable by an outsider.

== See also ==
- Australian megafauna
