= Sexual segregation =

Sexual segregation, in biology, is the segregation of males and females into different groups or the differential use of space, habitats, and resources by the males and females of a species outside the breeding season.

For the physical, legal, and cultural separation of humans according to their biological sex, see sex segregation.
