= Gowrie, New South Wales =

Gowrie
- Coordinates: 31°20′6″S 150°50′19″E
- Country: Australia
- State: New South Wales
- Region: New England
- LGA: Tamworth Regional Council

Government
  - State electorate: Tamworth
  - Federal division: New England

Area
  - Total: 126.9 km^{2} (49.0 sq mi)
- Elevation: 514 m (1,686 ft)

Population
  - Total: 92 (2016 census)
  - Density: 0.725/km^{2} (1.878/sq mi)
- Time zone: Australian EST
- Postcode: 2340
- County: Parry
- Parish: Goonoo Goonoo

Gowrie is a locality situated 1.6 km to the west of the New England Highway and approximately 29 km south of Tamworth in the New England area of New South Wales, Australia.

Australia Post identifies the district as a 'Delivery Area' within NSW post code area of 2340. Australian Bureau of Statistics identifies the area as a Community with a population of 92 as at the 2016 census.

The district is the area bounded by the New England Highway in the east, from Bartons Lane south to Mt. Sugarloaf. From Mt Sugarloaf the boundary follows the Peel Range in a north-westerly direction to Mt. Emblem, Mt. Heath and to where Heath Road meets the Werris Creek Road. It then follows Heath Road back to Bartons Lane, which forms the northern boundary. This is the area generally regarded as Gowrie. The land North of Gowrie between Bartons Lane and the Duri-Dungowan Road was once part of Walhallow Station, whose headquarters was at Caroona. All connections with Walhallow were severed when the last of the land not settled on, was sold off in 1910 - refer Early Settlement below.

== Name Derivation ==
Mr H. E. Whitten acquired a grazing property in the district about 1870-71 and named it 'Gowrie'. R S Ryan in his listing of Australian Place Names suggests that Mr Whitten took the name from Gowrie in Perthshire, Scotland however both Mr and Mrs Whitten (née Mason) immigrated from Ireland and it is not known if they had a connection to Scotland. Russ Bell in his book "The Whitten History (with a bit about the Masons)" suggests that it is more likely named after Gowran, a town in Tipperary approximately 100 km from the family homes of the Masons and Whittens. It has also been suggested that Gowrie may be the anglicized version of the local aboriginal word meaning'down of the eagle hawk'.

== Early settlement ==
The implementation of the Robertson Land Acts in 1861 saw settlers moving in and taking up land in the Gowrie area. They were allowed to take up from 40 to 320 acres at a price of £1 per acre and had to reside on the block for a minimum of 3 years.

In February 1910 a land ballot under the Closer Settlement (NSW) Act saw 22 blocks taken up in the Gowrie area. April of the same year saw another 13 blocks (9000 acres) auctioned off with the successful bidders paying between £3.16.0 and £9.10.10 per acre.

== Gowrie RFS and Community Hall ==
The Gowrie Rural Fire Service and community hall are situated at 238 Sweeneys Lane, Gowrie, NSW 2340, Australia. The Community Hall was built on the same site as the Gowrie Public School (below)

== Gowrie Fire Brigade ==
The Gowrie Brigade of the New South Wales Rural Fire Service was established in 1965 with the inaugural meeting on Wednesday 17 February 1965 and supported by the then Peel Shire Council. The Gowrie Brigade remains active with volunteers drawn from the district.

== Gowrie Public School ==
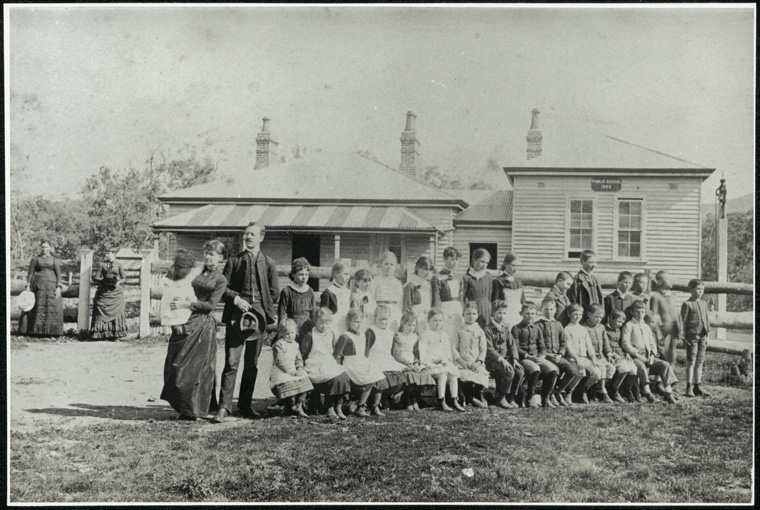
Gowrie Public School in 1887. The two ladies near the fence in the background are sisters, Mrs. Henry Whitten (née Elizabeth Mason) and Mrs. Alec Barthgate (née Grace Mason). The teacher is David Edward Rhind with his wife and baby. Most of the children, including the girls were wearing elastic-side boots which were the fashion.

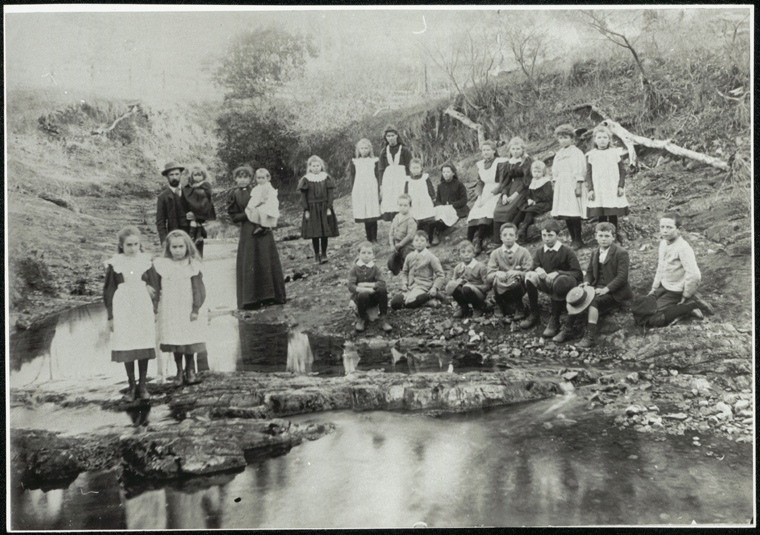
Pupils of Gowrie Public School in 1898. The teacher Mr. John Ward is nursing Eleena Ward, and his wife, Isobella (née Emblem) is nursing Laurie Ward. The two girls on the rock in the stream are Olive and Bernadine Ward whilst the boy standing and holding his hat is Norman Ward. The girls in the back row L. to R. are Ellie Frizzell, Eliza Whitten, Ellen Hough, Augusta McCulloch, May Moore, Ida Frizzell, Mildred Frizzell, Myrtle Moore and Maud Frizzell. The boys seated are L. to R. Wilfred Bailey, Vivian Bailey, Ernest Bailey, Percival Whitten, Jack White and Joseph McCulloch.

The residents of Gowrie made an application for the establishment of a school in 1880 and appropriate land had been identified by July 1881. A 0.8-hectare (2.0-acre) block was formally dedicated for school use on 12 January 1883 and a further 8 hectares were added on 21 August of the same year. Inspector Mr W. F. Thompson recommended the building of a weatherboard school to accommodate forty-five pupils and a residence with three rooms and a kitchen at an estimated total cost of £650. His recommendation was adopted and tenders were called in August 1882. The school opened in February 1884 with John Reily as its teacher. He was to remain there until August 1886.

"The school was fortunate to have a residence built to accommodate the teacher and his family (even if it was inadequate). But even then conditions were severe; chimneys that did not draw properly, very little drinking water, often times children had to carry their own ‘drink’ to school. Most children rode horses or drove sulkies in the pre-car days, some walked 3 or 4 miles, and often in bare feet, winter and summer."

The original brick building and residence was condemned and demolished after many years of service and replaced with a weather board building brought up from Willow Tree.

The school finally closed December 1969 (officially 21 January 1970)

== School Pupils win a medallion at the Chicago Columbian Exposition 1892 ==
The exhibition was held to mark the 400th anniversary of Christopher Columbus arriving in the New World.

The female pupils of Gowrie Public School won a medallion in an international competition at the Chicago Exhibition on 20 October 1892. All the girls attending the school that year sent a parcel of sewing to the Exhibition. Each girl was given a piece of material and was required to design an article, cut it out and hand-sew it. One article, a pair of "knickers", still exists, the bottom of each leg broadly crocheted and carrying a neatly hand-sewn button hole!

The medallion was some time in reaching the school because, apart from the local people, no one connected with the exhibition knew where Gowrie was! The medallion was displayed in the school for many years but its present whereabouts are unknown.

Many of the girls who contributed to the competition are in the photos opposite.

== Gowrie Progress Association ==
With the closure of the Gowrie School the community formed a Progress Association with the inaugural meeting held on 21 May 1970. The association was permitted to use the school buildings as a community centre.

Unfortunately after a Christmas Party for the local children later that year, the school building burned down. Gowrie was then provided with a new hall when the old Narrabri School building was transported to Gowrie. This also met with disaster when the partly constructed building (only requiring the roof to be added) was destroyed by a windstorm. This was sometime in 1973.

The current community hall was erected shortly after.

The Progress Association is still active as a Section 355 approved organisation under the Local Government Act 1993 with the official purposes being to a) submit recommendations and advice to Tamworth Regional Council in respect of the social and economic development of the Gowrie district and b) to manage and operate the Gowrie Community Hall including the collection of income from all users.

== Gowrie Post Office and Telephone Exchange ==
A receiving office for mail was opened at Gowrie on 7 February 1887. For the first 7 years it was run by whoever happened to be the teacher at the Gowrie school at the time, in return for an annual payment of £10. The first teacher to hold the position was David Edward Rhind. The Post Office closed on 30 April 1961 and the then Postmaster, Mr Bede Mundy, was appointed Telephone Office Keeper 1 May 1961.

The Gowrie Telephone Exchange opened on 23 July 1923 with 2 subscribers. The hours of service were 9am to 6pm. It expanded to about 17 subscribers in the early 1950s and grew from there. Gowrie became an automatic telephone exchange on 16 December 1976.

== Gowrie Girl's Death - Poison in the Mail ==
The district received much media attention in 1923 when a 9-year girl, Rita Veronica Jamieson was poisoned by chocolates laced with strychnine and posted to the home of her grandmother, Annie Moore, who was post-mistress of Gowrie at the time.

== Churches at Gowrie ==
Lyall Green, in his "Chronological History of Tamworth", noted "During 1928, "a freak windstorm travelling a very narrow path struck the area that contained the Catholic Church, a Union Church, Gowrie Public School, and the home of Richard Reading and his family. The school and the Reading homestead were undamaged but both churches were totally destroyed. A lamp standing on the verandah of the Reading home was not even overturned in the mêlée!"

This event that occurred on 2 October 1928 was also recorded as far afield as Broken Hill

=== Gowrie Uniting Church ===
A Methodist church was built to replace the Union Church and opened on 6 October 1933 by the senior Methodist lady in the district and Postmistress, Annie (Mrs William) Moore (née Mason). Annie's husband, William, was the first non-teacher postmaster and after his death in 1905, Annie ran the post office until 1933. William and Annie had a small farm along Spring Creek, a little downstream from where the Methodist Church was built.

The Uniting Church in Australia was formed on 22 June 1977, as a union of three churches: the Congregational Union of Australia, the Methodist Church of Australasia and the Presbyterian Church of Australia.

On 14 March 2002 the Gowrie Community Church joined with Hallsville Community Church and West Tamworth Uniting Church to become the Peel Peel Valley Uniting Church.

=== Gowrie Catholic Church ===
Land was dedicated for a Roman Catholic church and Presbytery at Gowrie on 22 March 1878. The block was of some 0.6 hectares and was located about 1.5 kilometres to the south of the present Gowrie Uniting Church. It was not until about 1890 that a wooden church was erected on the land. In the meantime, Catholics attended Mass in various private homes, as they had done previously.

After this building was destroyed in the 1928 storm another wooden church was built for the Catholic congregation, a little to the north-west of the present Gowrie Uniting Church. The new church was named St Brigid's and was dedicated by the Bishop of Armidale, his Lordship Dr O'Connor on 5 May 1929. The new church was, at first, part of St Patrick's Parish but later became part of St Edward's Parish.

During the 1980s and 1990s, Mass was still occasionally celebrated at St Brigid's. The property eventually passed into private hands in 1998 and is now occupied as a dwelling.
