= Sexual segregation (biology) =

In biology, sexual segregation is the differential use of space, habitats, and resources by males and females, or the separation of males and females into different social groups outside the breeding season. Sexual segregation is widespread among animals, especially among vertebrates that live in groups, and has also been observed in plants. It was first formally proposed by Charles Darwin in his book The Descent of Man, and Selection in Relation to Sex.

== Definition ==
Sexual segregation has traditionally been defined as the differential use of space (spatial segregation) or habitat (habitat segregation) by males and females. Recently, it has also been defined as the separation of males and females into different social groups (social segregation) outside the breeding season. Some authors consider social segregation to be a by-product of habitat segregation but it is now known that social segregation can occur independently of habitat segregation. Conradt (2005) argued that spatial segregation should be treated as a auxiliary concept as both habitat segregation and social segregation can lead to spatial segregation.
